= Early life of George W. Bush =

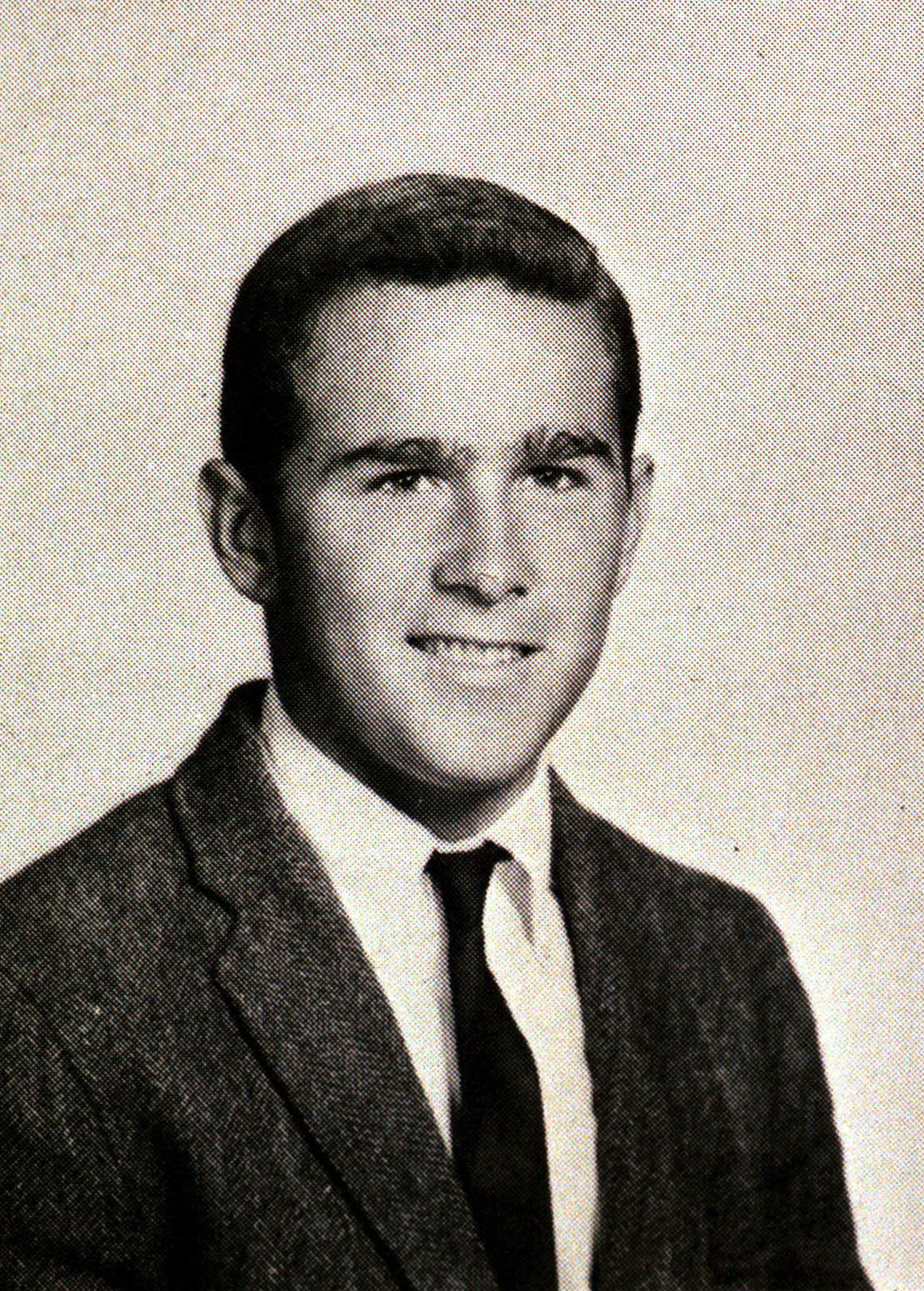
Bush in Phillips Academy's 1964 yearbook

George W. Bush (born 1946) was born in the city of New Haven, Connecticut as the eldest of six children. He grew up in Midland and Houston, Texas. Bush studied at Yale University and Harvard Business School before serving in the Texas Air National Guard. Bush would later be part owner and managing partner of Major League Baseball's Texas Rangers, become governor of Texas, and eventually become the 43rd president of the United States.

== Upbringing and education ==
George Walker Bush, the oldest son of George Herbert Walker Bush and Barbara Bush, was born in New Haven, Connecticut, on July 6, 1946. When Bush was just two years old, his father moved the family from New Haven to the town of Odessa in West Texas to begin a career in the oil industry. According to George W., then age two, the family lived in one of the few duplexes in Odessa with an indoor bathroom, which they "shared with a couple of hookers". He was subsequently raised in Midland and Houston, Texas, with siblings Jeb, Neil, Marvin, and Dorothy. A younger sister, Robin, died of leukemia in 1953 at the age of three, when Bush was 7. His parents came to pick him up from school two days after her death; Bush ran up to their car hoping to see Robin with them, and they told him the news. Bush understood that his sister had died, but his younger brother Jeb did not. The family spent the summers and most holidays at the Bush Compound in Maine.

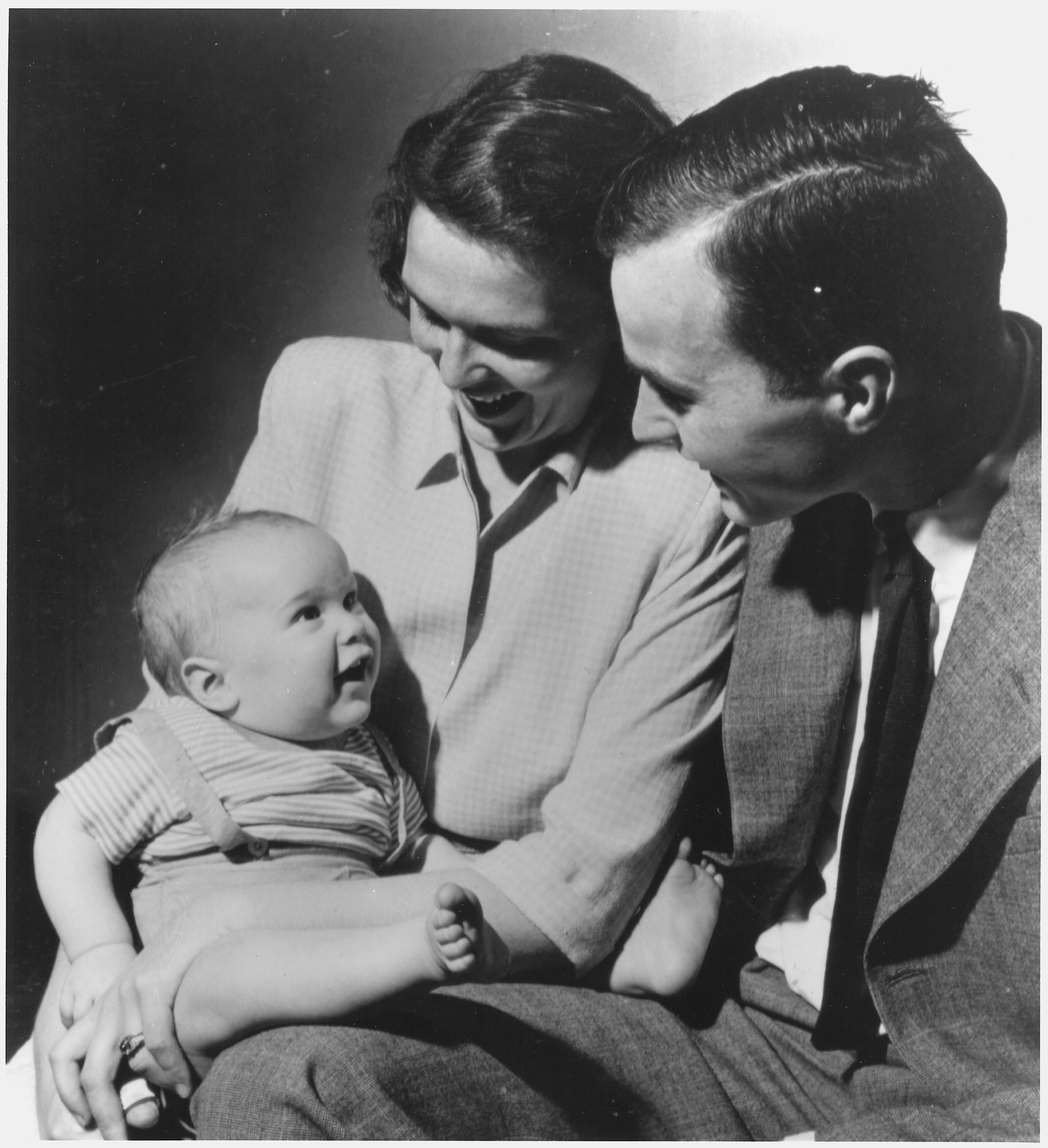
George W. Bush with his parents, Barbara and George H. W. Bush, c. 1947

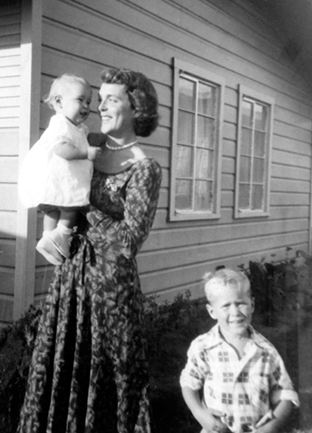
George W. Bush (right) with his mother Barbara & sister Robin in Texas, October 1950

Bush attended Sam Houston Elementary School and San Jacinto Junior High School in Midland, Texas. He spent summers at Camp Longhorn, which later his daughters would attend. He later moved to The Kinkaid School in Piney Point Village, Texas for two years. Afterward, like his father, Bush attended Phillips Academy (September 1961–June 1964) and later Yale University (September 1964–May 1968). Bush scored a 1206 out of 1600 on the SAT; 566 on the verbal section, and 640 on the math section. Bush cheered for both Philips Academy's and Yale's football teams, as it was quite common for cheerleaders to be male in Bush's time. At Yale, he joined Delta Kappa Epsilon, of which he was from October 1965 until graduation, and the Skull and Bones secret society; Bush's father George H. W. Bush (1948) and grandfather Prescott S. Bush (1917) were also members of Skull and Bones. Bush was also in the Yale First XV rugby union team in 1968. He was a C student, scoring 77% (with no As and one D, in astronomy) with a grade point average of 2.35 out of a possible 4.00. Bush joked that he was known more for his social life than for his grades. He received a Bachelor of Arts degree in history in 1968. The entire entry from his yearbook read:

GEORGE BUSH. Born July 6, 1946, in New Haven, Connecticut, son of George H.W. Bush (Class of '48) and Barbara Pierce Bush. Prepared at Phillips Academy-Andover, Andover, Massachusetts. Entered Yale, September, 1964. History Major. Resident Member: Davenport (Social Council, 1964-68; Football, 1964-68, Captain, 1967-68; Baseball, 1965-68); Delta Kappa Epsilon, President, 1966-67; Skull and Bones; Inter- Council, 1966-67; Freshman Baseball, 1965; Rugby Club, 1966-68. Roommates: R.J. Dieter, C. Johnson, III, C. Johnson, Jr. Address: Apt. 8, 5000 Longmont Drive, Houston, Texas 77027.

Bush's 1970 application to the University of Texas School of Law was rejected, and after his service in the Texas Air National Guard he entered Harvard Business School in 1973. He graduated with a Master of Business Administration (MBA) degree in 1975, the first U.S. president with an MBA.

=== Rugby ===
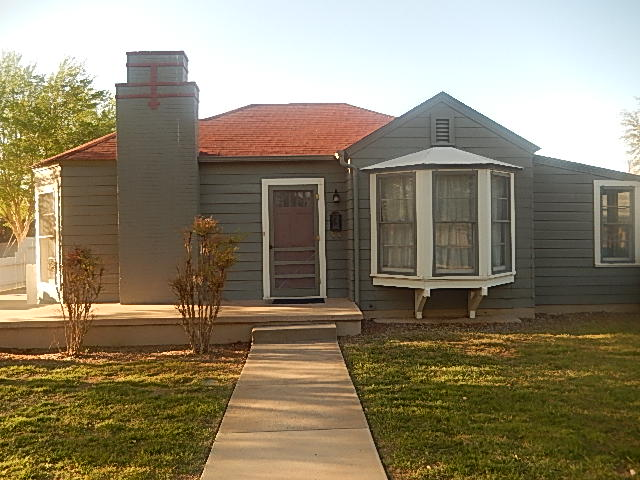
The Midland, Texas boyhood home of Bush

Bush was a keen rugby union player, during high school and Yale University. He played at the position of fullback for Yale's 1st XV, and in 1968 was in the Yale team that dramatically defeated Harvard.

== Service in the Air National Guard ==
After graduating from Yale University, Bush joined the Texas Air National Guard on May 27, 1968, during the Vietnam War, with a commitment to serve until May 26, 1974. He was promoted to first lieutenant on the November 1970 recommendation of Texas Air National Guard commander Lt. Col. Jerry B. Killian. He served as an F-102 pilot until 1972. Bush was discharged from the Texas Air National Guard and transferred to inactive duty in the Air Force Reserve. He was honorably discharged from the Air Force Reserve on November 21, 1974, at the end of his six-year service obligation.

== Alcohol use and DUI arrest ==
Bush had described his days before his religious conversion in his 40s as his nomadic period and irresponsible youth. Although Bush states that he was not an alcoholic, he has acknowledged that he was "drinking too much".

On September 4, 1976, Bush was arrested for driving under the influence of alcohol near his family's summer home in Kennebunkport, Maine. He pled guilty, was fined US$150, and had his driving license in the state briefly suspended.

During the 2000 presidential campaign, Bush said that he gave up drinking after waking up with a hangover after his 40th birthday celebration: "I quit drinking in 1986 and haven't had a drop since then." He ascribed the change in part to a 1985 meeting with Reverend Billy Graham, after which he began serious Bible study, as well as to gentle but persistent pressure from his wife, Laura.

== Family life ==
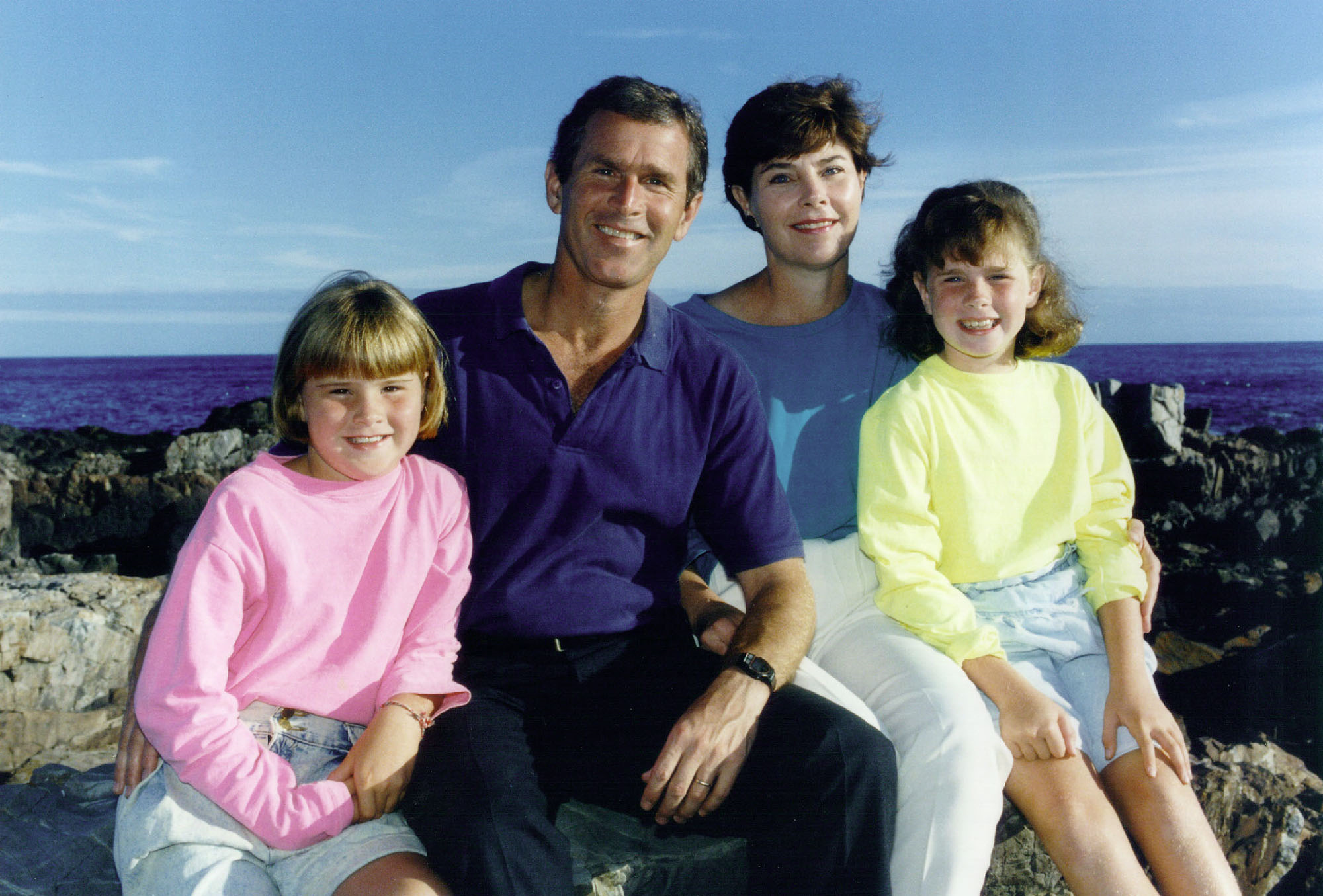
Bush and his family, c. 1990

Bush married Laura Welch in 1977. They have fraternal twin daughters, Barbara Pierce Bush and Jenna Welch Bush Hager, born in 1981.
