= Walker's Point Estate =

Bush family summer estate and former Summer White House in Maine

Coordinates: 43.3433°N 70.4594°W

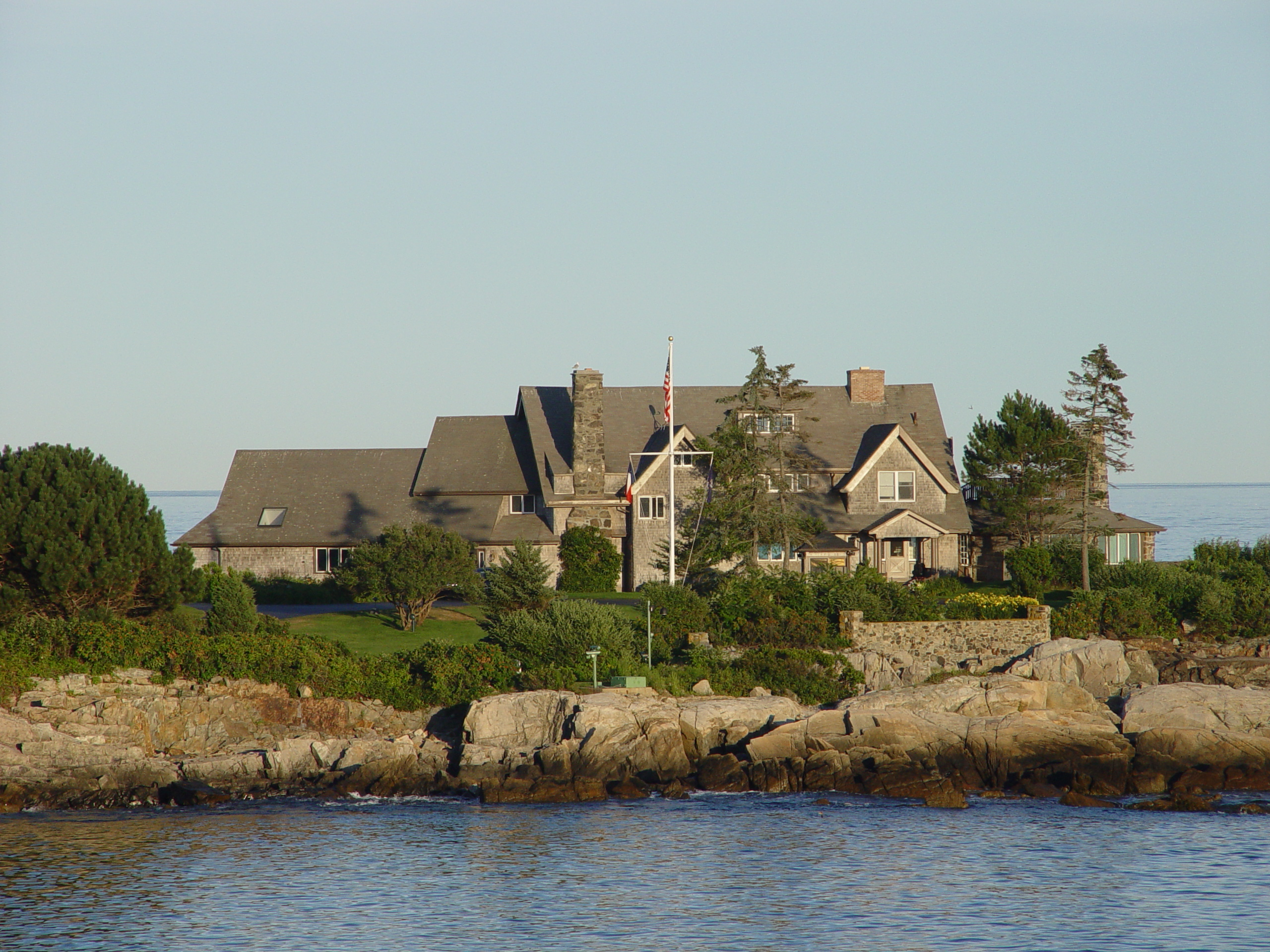
The Walker's Point Estate

Location in Maine

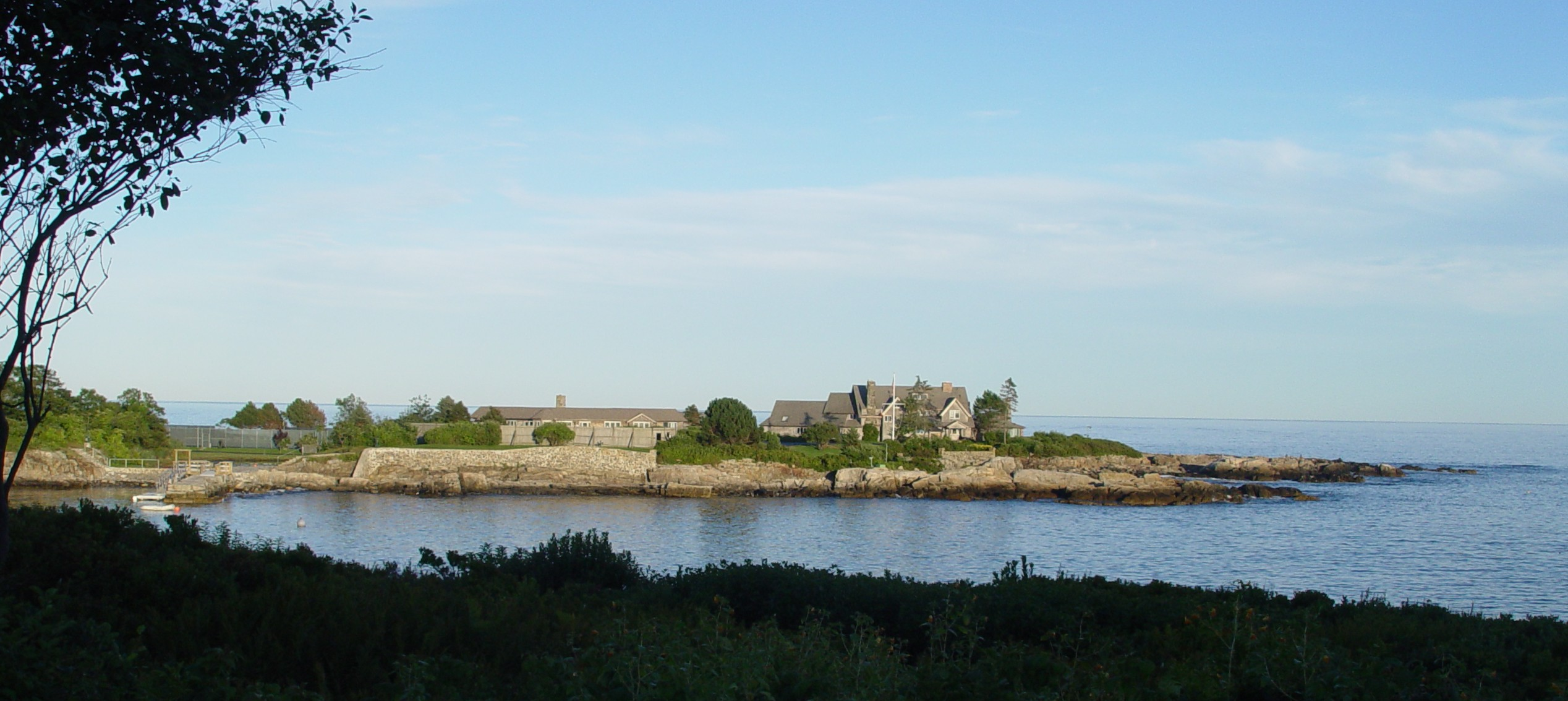
The large central house (2007)

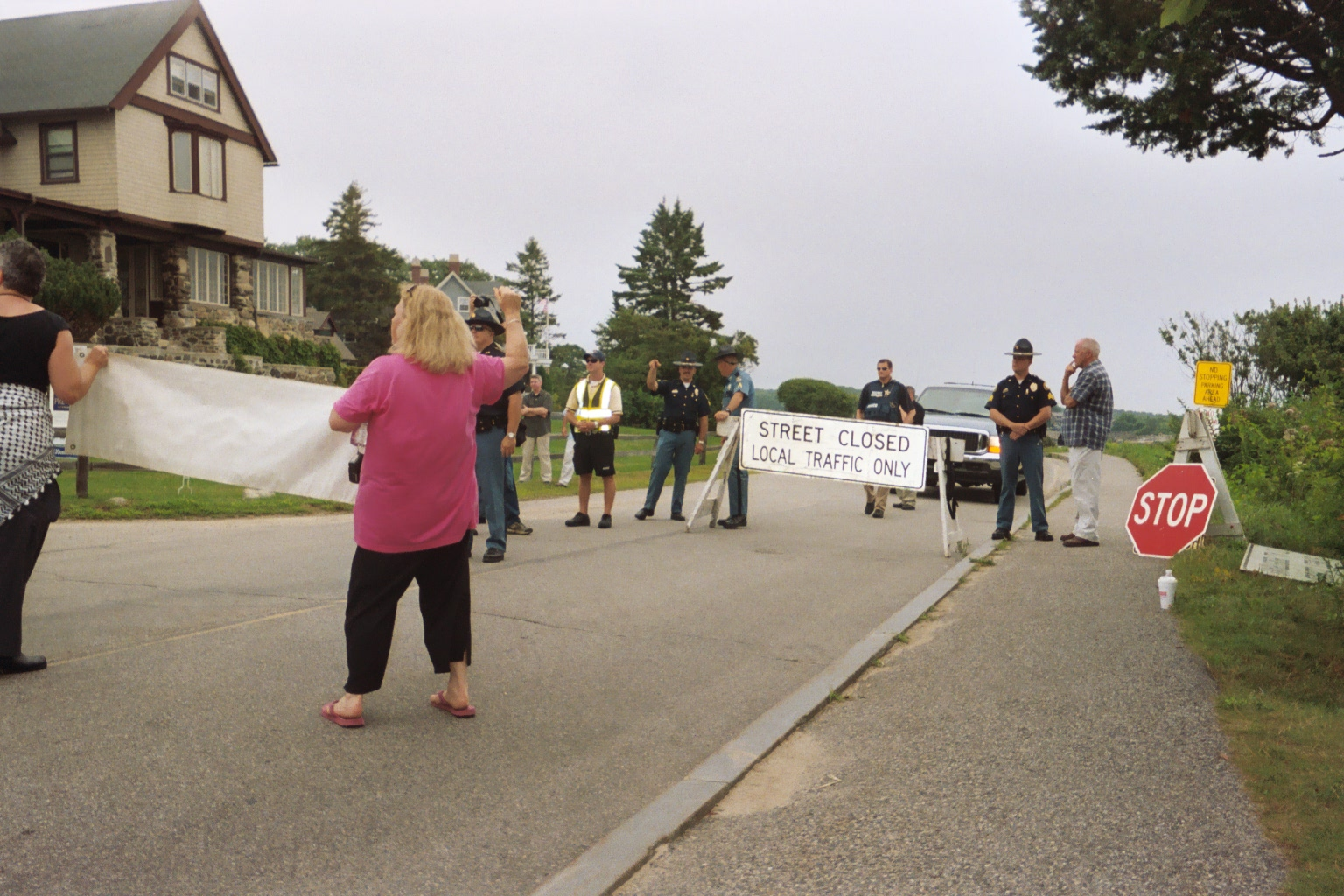
Checkpoint on Ocean Avenue

Walker's Point Estate (also known as the Bush compound) is a private family estate and former Summer White House located in Kennebunkport, Maine. The estate has served as the summer retreat of the Bush family for over a century, beginning with George Herbert Walker in the early 1900s. It gained national prominence as the Summer White House during the presidency of George H. W. Bush (1989–1993), commonly called simply Kennebunkport during that period. The property continued to host presidential visits during the administration of his son, George W. Bush (2001–2009).

Located on Walker's Point, a promontory extending into the Atlantic Ocean, the estate consists of a main house built in the New England shingle style, along with several outbuildings and recreational facilities. The property has served as a venue for diplomatic meetings with world leaders and remains an active family residence.

== History ==
=== Early ownership ===
The property was originally known as Point Vesuvius and served as a popular picnicking spot for Kennebunkport residents. The Boston and Kennebunkport Seashore Company also called it "Damon's Park" for a period in honor of one of the company's founders.

In 1902, George Herbert Walker purchased the property on August 30, when he was 27 years old. His father, David Davis Walker, a successful dry goods merchant from St. Louis, Missouri, jointly invested in the property. Both men constructed separate houses on the point, which were described in the first issue of 1903's The Wave as new construction. David Davis Walker's mansion was later demolished, while George Herbert Walker's residence became the foundation of the current main house.

=== Transfer to the Bush family ===
In 1921, following the marriage of Dorothy Walker to Prescott Bush on August 6 in Kennebunkport, Maine, George Herbert Walker constructed a smaller residence on the property as a wedding gift for the newlyweds. Upon George Herbert Walker's death in 1953, his son George Herbert Walker Jr. ("Herbie") purchased the property from his father's estate. When Herbie died in 1977, the estate was again sold, this time to his nephew, George H. W. Bush, who had spent much of his childhood at the property.

=== Bush family residence ===
George H. W. Bush, along with his wife Barbara Bush and their children George W. Bush, Jeb Bush, Marvin Bush, Neil Bush, Dorothy Bush Koch, and Pauline Robinson Bush, spent most summers at Walker's Point throughout the latter half of the 20th century. The estate served as a gathering place for family celebrations, weddings, and holidays.

== Presidential use ==
=== Summer White House (1989–1993) ===
During George H. W. Bush's presidency, Walker's Point functioned as an official Summer White House. The estate hosted numerous diplomatic meetings and informal summits with world leaders, including British Prime Minister Margaret Thatcher and Soviet leader Mikhail Gorbachev. In a 2015 interview, Bush reflected on hosting world leaders including "Francois Mitterrand, King Hussein of Jordan, Prime Minister Kaifu of Japan, British Prime Minister John Major, Prime Minister Rabin of Israel, Prime Minister Schluter of Denmark... Canadian Prime Minister Brian Mulroney. Mikhail Gorbachev and Helmut Kohl both came when we were all out of office."

Bush noted that a particularly significant period occurred in August 1990, when he met with world leaders and his own team at Walker's Point to discuss how to handle Iraq's invasion of Kuwait. The property's role as a diplomatic venue reflected the Bush administration's preference for personal diplomacy conducted in informal settings.

When President Bush was in residence, the presidential flag was displayed below the American flag on the estate's prominent flagpole, which became a recognizable backdrop for news broadcasts during the Bush presidency. Security arrangements included protection by the United States Secret Service, with controlled access through a gated entrance.

=== Continued presidential visits ===
Following his father's presidency, George W. Bush continued to visit the estate regularly during his own presidency (2001–2009). However, his primary presidential retreat was Prairie Chapel Ranch near Crawford, Texas, which served as his "Western White House." During the George W. Bush presidency, the Kennebunkport estate continued to host international leaders, including Russian President Vladimir Putin and French President Nicolas Sarkozy.

== Architecture and grounds ==
=== Main residence ===
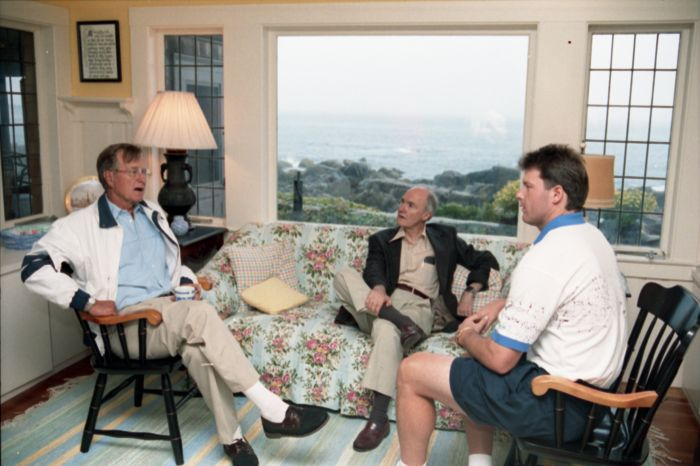
President Bush (left) inside the home with National Security Advisor Brent Scowcroft (center) and baseball player Roger Clemens in 1991

The main house exemplifies the New England shingle style architecture popular in late 19th-century coastal New England. The residence contains nine bedrooms, four sitting rooms, an office, a den, a library, a dining room, a kitchen, and multiple patios and decks that take advantage of the oceanfront location.

=== Outbuildings and facilities ===
The estate includes several outbuildings and recreational facilities: a four-car garage, swimming pool, tennis court, dock, boathouse, and guesthouse. The property features extensive lawns on both sides of the main house, including a small recreational field for family activities.

=== Flagpole ===
The estate's flagpole serves both ceremonial and practical functions. During presidential visits, it displayed the presidential flag alongside the American flag, and at times also flew the flags of Maine and Texas. The flagpole has been lowered to half-staff to honor deceased family members, including Barbara Bush in 2018.

== Notable events ==
=== 1991 storm damage ===
In late October 1991, the estate sustained significant damage from a severe coastal storm, with waves reportedly reaching three stories in height. Damage to the home and contents was estimated between $300,000 and $400,000. President Bush received flood insurance compensation but declined to claim storm damage deductions on his 1991 tax return to avoid potential conflicts of interest, as he was responsible for declaring Maine a federal disaster area.

=== Recent developments ===
In 2015, Jeb Bush constructed an additional residence on Walker's Point.

== Cultural significance ==
George H. W. Bush reflected on his memories of the estate in a 1997 letter to Portland Magazine, recalling childhood experiences and social connections with other prominent families who summered in the Kennebunkport area. The estate represents continuity in American political families' connection to seasonal retreats and the tradition of conducting informal diplomacy away from formal government settings. The property has been described by family members as "just a family place that means family love," reflecting its ongoing importance as a private family retreat despite its public prominence.

== See also ==
- List of residences of presidents of the United States
- Summer White House
- Presidential memorials in the United States
