= Stratesec =

Security company (1987–2002)

- Founded: 1987
- Headquarters: Woodcliff Lake, New Jersey

Stratesec (formerly known as Securacom and Burns and Roe Securacom) was a security company founded in 1987 and based out of Woodcliff Lake, New Jersey. The company went public on October 2, 1997 on the American Stock Exchange and was delisted in 2002.

== Company history ==
At IPO in 1997, Securacom listed among its clients Washington Dulles International Airport, Hewlett-Packard, EDS, United Airlines, Gillette, MCI, the World Trade Center, and other facilities including hospitals, prisons, corporations, utilities, universities.

Marvin Bush, son of former US president George H. W. Bush, and brother to former US president George W. Bush, served on the board of directors from 1993 to June 2000.

=== Trademark lawsuit ===
After the company went public in 1997, Securacom was ordered to change its name, as the result of a 1995 name infringement suit brought by SecuraComm, a smaller Pittsburgh-based consultancy. The court found a deliberate effort by Securacom to financially "bury" the plaintiff, Ron Libengood, and "take everything he had" by filing a barrage of frivolous arguments against Libengood and his attorneys in multiple jurisdictions. Appellate courts opined that Securacom "tried to prevail by crushing Libengood and his corporation" in a "sweeping attempt to beat a financially weaker opponent through the use of vexatious litigation." The company changed its name to "Stratesec" in 1998.

=== Delisting ===
Stratesec was delisted from the American Stock Exchange in July 2002 due to inability to make financing payments to ES Bankest, its primary shareholder, and other financial problems.

== See also ==
- Kroll Inc. - Securacom sold security-related equipment to the New York Port Authority for the security of the World Trade Center. Securacom's contract for the sale of equipment was terminated in 1998.
