= Marvin Pierce =

American publisher (1893–1969)

- Born: June 17, 1893; Sharpsville, Pennsylvania, U.S.
- Died: July 17, 1969 (aged 76); Rye, New York, U.S.
- Burial place: Greenwood Union Cemetery
- Education: Miami University; Massachusetts Institute of Technology; Harvard University
- Occupations: President of McCall Corporation, publisher of women's magazines Redbook and McCall's
- Spouses: Pauline Robinson (m. 1918; died 1949) Willa Martin (m. 1952)
- Children: Martha; James; Barbara; Scott
- Relatives: George W. Bush (grandson); Jeb Bush (grandson); Jenna Bush Hager (great-granddaughter); Kevin Rafferty (grandson)

Marvin "Monk" Pierce (June 17, 1893 – July 17, 1969) was president of McCall Corporation, the publisher of the popular women's magazines Redbook and McCall's. He was the father of United States first lady Barbara Pierce Bush, the maternal grandfather of former U.S. president George W. Bush and former Florida governor Jeb Bush, and the father-in-law of former U.S. president George H. W. Bush.

== Early life ==
Marvin Pierce was born on June 17, 1893, in Sharpsville, Pennsylvania, to Mabel Pierce (née Marvin; 1869–1955) and Scott Pierce (1866–1945). Scott Pierce was an insurance salesman in Dayton, Ohio. His ancestor Thomas Pierce (1618–1683), an early New England colonist, was also an ancestor of Franklin Pierce, the 14th President of the United States.

Marvin attended Steele High School in Dayton. He was a 1916 graduate of Miami University, Oxford, Ohio, where he was a member of Beta Theta Pi fraternity, he was nicknamed "Monk" and was a stand-out athlete in football, basketball, baseball and tennis. He was inducted into Miami's Athletic Hall of Fame in 1972. He also received graduate degrees from MIT in civil engineering and from Harvard in architectural engineering.

== Career ==
Pierce served as the president of McCall Corporation, the publisher of the popular women's magazines Redbook and McCall's.

== Personal life ==
=== Marriage to Pauline Robinson ===
Pierce's first marriage (August 1918) was to Pauline Robinson (1896–1949), who was born on 28 April 1896 to Ohio Supreme Court justice James E. Robinson and his wife Lula Dell Flickinger, and grew up in Marysville, Ohio. They had four children together:

- Martha Pierce Rafferty (1920–1999), mother of filmmakers Kevin Rafferty and Pierce Rafferty
- James Pierce (1922–1993)
- Barbara Pierce Bush (1925–2018), First Lady of the United States from 1989 to 1993.
- Scott Pierce (1930–2022) – named for his grandfather

Robinson was an American socialite who W magazine once described as "beautiful, fabulous, critical, and meddling" and "a former beauty from Ohio with extravagant tastes". Their daughter Martha was a model who appeared on the cover of Vogue. Robinson was a descendant of Henry II of England. Pauline was killed at age 53 in a September 1949 automotive accident when Marvin, the driver, hit a tree in Harrison, Westchester County, New York. His granddaughter Pauline Robinson Bush (1949–1953), was named after her.

Their third child, Barbara Pierce, later became the wife of the 41st president of the United States, George H. W. Bush, mother of the 43rd president of the United States, George W. Bush and of the 43rd governor of Florida, Jeb Bush. Her youngest son, Marvin Bush, is named after him.

=== Marriage to Willa Gray Martin ===
Pierce's second marriage in June 1952 was to Willa Gray Martin (1911–2006), a Yale graduate, artist, and Associated Press reporter.

=== Descendants ===
He has at least 17 great-grandchildren, including Jenna Bush Hager, and at least 11 great-great-grandchildren (5 through George W. Bush).

== Death and legacy ==
Pierce died on July 17, 1969, in Rye, New York, at the age of 76, and was interred at Greenwood Union Cemetery. He was survived by his children, two daughters-in-law, two sons-in-law (one of whom was George H. W. Bush), and his grandchildren (two of whom are George W. Bush and Jeb Bush). He was preceded in death by his granddaughter Pauline Robinson Bush in October 1953.
