= McCall Corporation =

Defunct American magazine publisher

- Company type: Publishing
- Industry: Magazines
- Founded: 1913
- Founders: James McCall
- Fate: Acquired by Norton Simon Inc.
- Headquarters: New York City, New York, U.S.
- Products: Magazines

McCall Corporation was an American publishing company that produced some popular magazines. These included Redbook for women, Bluebook for men, McCall's, the Saturday Review, and Popular Mechanics. It also published Better Living, a magazine that was distributed solely through grocery stores.

== History ==
The company is named after the founder of its namesake magazine, James McCall, who was a Scottish tailor. Redbook and Bluebook were purchased in 1929. The Saturday Review was purchased in 1961.

In later years, Marvin Pierce, the father of Barbara Bush, served as the McCall Corporation's president.

A controlling stake in the company was bought by Norton Simon's Hunt Foods in 1956. It became a division of Norton Simon Inc., along with Hunt and Canada Dry, in 1968.

The Saturday Review was sold in 1971, and McCall's was sold in 1973, both to groups of private investors. Redbook was sold to the Charter Company in 1975.

== McCall's Magazine ==
McCall's began as a four-page fashion journal entitled The Queen: Illustrating McCall's Bazaar Glove-Fitting Patterns. It would become one of the country's leading women's magazines. Its name was changed to Rosie in 2001 as part of a partnership with then-talk show host Rosie O'Donnell to capitalize on the success of Oprah Winfrey's O: The Oprah Magazine for the Hearst Corporation. The magazine ceased publication in 2002.

== Blue Book and Red Book ==
In 1929, McCall's Corporation purchased two short story magazines.

Blue Book had its name modified to Bluebook and remained a short story magazine until McCall's discontinued publication in 1956.

Red Book had its name modified to Redbook and evolved into a general interest magazine that published fiction and nonfiction. It is now owned by Hearst Corporation, and has a target audience of women.

== Popular Mechanics ==
Popular Mechanics began publication in 1902. By the late 1930s, it was owned by McCall Corporation. The magazine is now owned by the Hearst Corporation, and has a circulation of nine million readers.

== Saturday Review ==
From 1920 to 1924, Literary Review was a Saturday supplement to the New York Evening Post. In 1924, it became a separate publication entitled The Saturday Review of Literature In 1942, the name was shortened to The Saturday Review.

McCall Corporation purchased the magazine in 1961. It changed ownership several times after 1977, and ceased publication in 1986.

== Better Living ==
In 1951, McCall Corporation began publishing Better Living. The 100-page monthly magazine sold for five cents, and was distributed through stores that were members of the Super Market Institute. It ceased publication in 1956.

== See also ==
- Blue Book
- McCall's
- Popular Mechanics
- Redbook
- Saturday Review
