= Marvin Bush =

American businessman (born 1956)

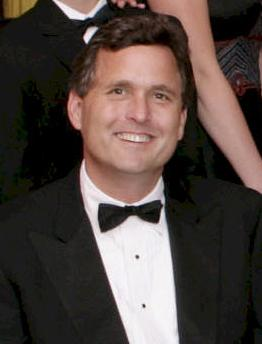
- Bush in 2005
- Born: Marvin Pierce Bush; October 22, 1956 (age 70); Midland, Texas, U.S.
- Education: University of Virginia (BA)
- Spouse: Margaret Conway Molster (m. 1981)
- Children: 2
- Parents: George H. W. Bush; Barbara Bush
- Relatives: Bush family

Marvin Pierce Bush (born October 22, 1956) is an American businessman. He is a son of former U.S. president George H. W. Bush and First Lady Barbara Bush and the brother of George W. Bush, the late Robin Bush, Jeb Bush, Neil Bush, and Dorothy Bush Koch.

== Biography ==
=== Early life ===
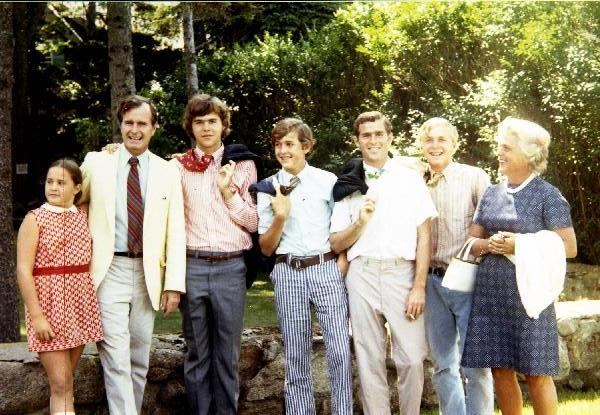
Bush (center) with his family

Marvin Pierce Bush was born on October 22, 1956, in Midland, Texas, and was named after his maternal grandfather, Marvin Pierce. He attended Woodberry Forest School in Virginia, graduating in 1975. He went on to obtain a B.A. degree in English from the University of Virginia, where he became a member of the Delta Phi fraternity (St. Elmo Hall). He spent most summers and holidays at the Bush family estate.

=== Career ===
He worked as director of HCC Insurance Holdings. HCC, formerly Houston Casualty Company, is a publicly traded insurance company on the New York Stock Exchange. He appears in the 2008 award-winning documentary on Lee Atwater, Boogie Man: The Lee Atwater Story. He served on the board of directors for SECURACOM from 1993 to June 2000.

=== Personal life ===
He is married to Margaret Conway (née Molster; born 1959). They have two adopted children: a daughter, Marshall Lloyd (born 1986), and a son, Charles Walker (born 1989).

== Politics ==
In the 2016 presidential election, Bush endorsed Libertarian candidate Gary Johnson, over either Republican candidate Donald Trump or Democratic candidate Hillary Clinton. He stated that Johnson and running mate Bill Weld were both two-term governors, who are "fiscally conservative, and their essential message is 'get bureaucracy off our backs', which used to be a part of what the Republicans believed." He said that a list of controversies made Clinton untrustworthy, and cited Trump's negativity.

Bush previously endorsed his brother Jeb Bush, who lost the Republican primary. His announcement was consistent with his family's general opposition to Trump. In the Republican primaries, however, his brother, Neil Bush, joined the Ted Cruz election campaign on the finance team.
