= Dorothy Bush Koch =

American writer and philanthropist

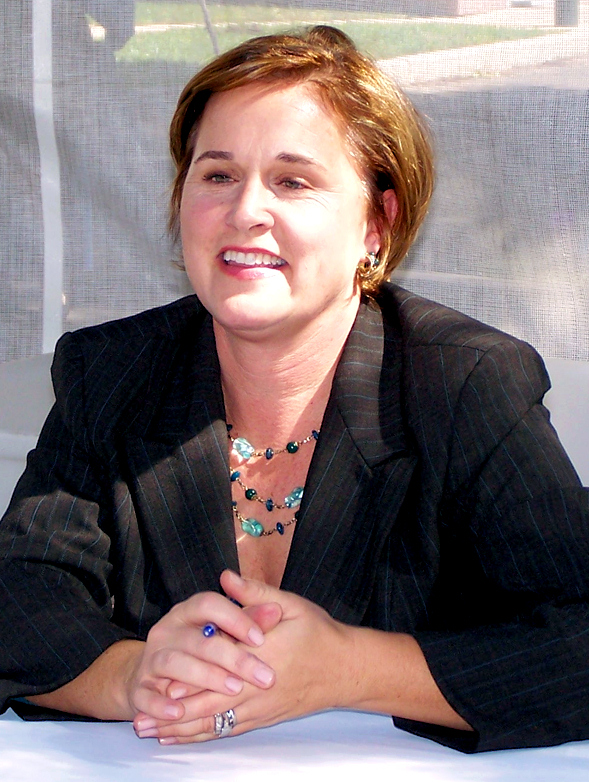
- Koch in 2006
- Born: Dorothy Walker Bush; August 18, 1959 (age 67); Harris County, Texas, U.S.
- Education: Boston College (BA)
- Occupations: Author, philanthropist
- Spouses: William LeBlond (m. 1982; div. 1990) Bobby Koch (m. 1992)
- Children: 4
- Parents: George H. W. Bush; Barbara Bush
- Relatives: Bush family

Dorothy Walker Bush LeBlond Koch (born August 18, 1959) is an American author and philanthropist. She is the sixth and youngest child of the 41st president of the United States, George H. W. Bush, and First Lady Barbara Bush. Her older brother, George W. Bush, was the 43rd U.S. president.

== Early life ==
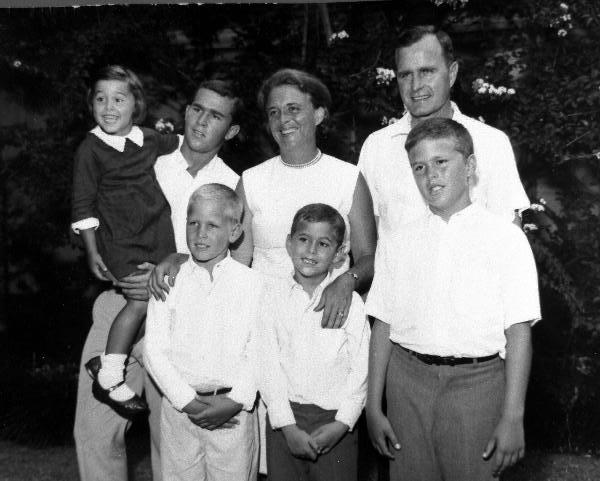
Bush family in the early 1960s, Dorothy on far left

Dorothy Walker Bush was born on August 18, 1959, in Harris County, Texas. Her father, George H. W. Bush, was the 41st President of the United States, and her mother, Barbara Bush, was the First Lady. She was named after her paternal grandmother, Dorothy Walker Bush. Her brother, George W. Bush, was the 43rd president of the United States, in office from 2001 to 2009. Her other four siblings are Pauline Robinson "Robin" Bush, who died of leukemia in 1953; former Florida governor Jeb Bush; Neil Bush; and Marvin Bush. Since her childhood she has spent summers and holidays at the Bush compound, a seacoast estate in Kennebunkport, Maine.

Bush was educated at Miss Porter's School, a private all-girl college-preparatory school in Farmington, Connecticut.

In 1975, during a visit to Beijing, she became the first person to be publicly baptized in the People's Republic of China since its communist government began discouraging foreign religious practices in 1949.

She earned a Bachelor of Arts degree in sociology from Boston College in 1982.

== Career and volunteer work ==
Bush is an event organizer and fundraiser for charities and other nonprofit organizations. She co-chairs the Barbara Bush Foundation for Family Literacy along with her brother Jeb. She also served as a pioneer fundraiser for her brother's presidential campaigns.

She is the author of the book My Father, My President: A Personal Account of the Life of George H. W. Bush (2006).

She sponsored the commission of USS George H.W. Bush, a United States Navy aircraft carrier named after her father, who in World War II was a naval aviator serving on an aircraft carrier. On January 10, 2009, she gave the first orders to the ship's company at Norfolk, Virginia.

== Personal life ==
In 1982, Bush married William Heekin LeBlond. They had two children. They divorced in 1990.

In June 1992, she married Bobby Koch, with whom she had two children. The wedding took place at Camp David. Robert P. Koch was an aide to House Democratic leader Richard Gephardt, and is president of the California-based Wine Institute. He has a substantial equity interest in Central European Distribution Corp., a company that manufactures and distributes vodka in Poland.
