= Pauline Robinson Bush =

Daughter of US president George H. W. Bush (1949–1953)

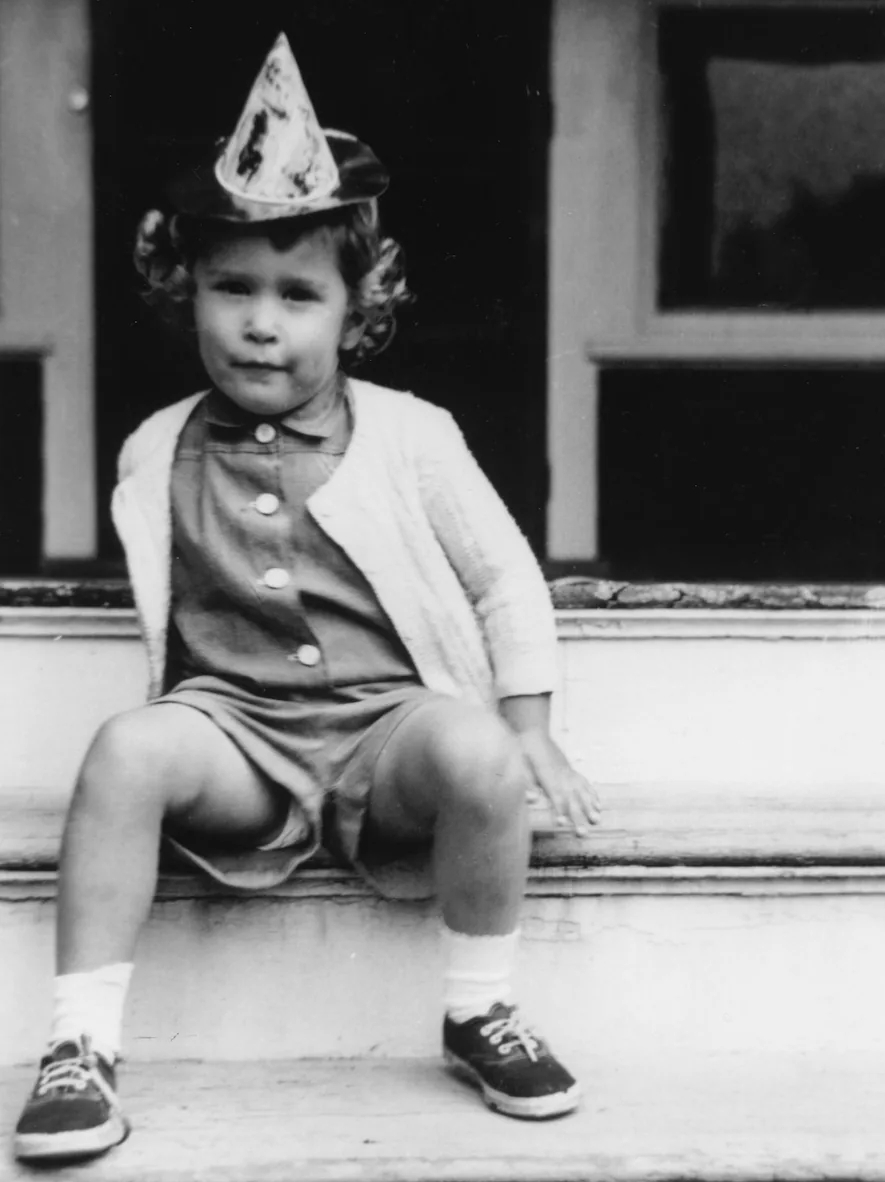
- Bush in 1953
- Born: December 20, 1949; Compton, California, U.S.
- Died: October 11, 1953 (aged 3); New York City, U.S.
- Cause of death: Leukemia
- Resting place: Putnam Cemetery (1953–2000); George H.W. Bush Presidential Library and Museum (since 2000)
- Other name: Robin Bush
- Parents: George H. W. Bush; Barbara Bush
- Family: Bush family

Pauline Robinson Bush (December 20, 1949 – October 11, 1953), commonly known as Robin Bush, was the second child and first daughter of the 41st president of the United States, George H. W. Bush, and his wife, First Lady Barbara Bush. After she was born in California, her family soon relocated to Texas, where Robin lived most of her life.

At the age of three, Robin was diagnosed with advanced leukemia. As she was given very little time to live, her parents flew her to New York City for treatment, where she spent the next six months. Despite doctors' efforts, she died at the age of 3 years, 9 months. Her death prompted the family to establish a foundation for leukemia research.

== Life ==
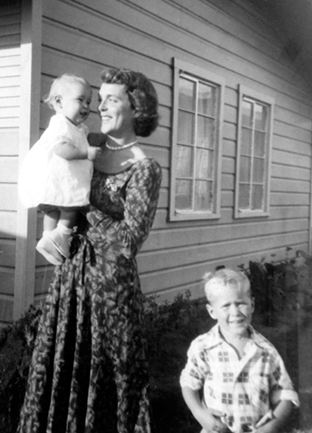
Barbara Bush with Robin and George W. Bush in Texas, October 1950

Then an oil field equipment salesman for Dresser Industries, George H. W. Bush lived in various places around the United States with his wife, Barbara (née Pierce), and their young son, George W. In 1949, they moved to Compton, California; by then, Barbara was pregnant with the couple's second child. On September 23, 1949, Pauline Robinson Pierce, Barbara's mother, was killed in a car accident, which also injured her father, Marvin. Since she was very late into the pregnancy, Marvin advised Barbara not to travel to New York, so as not to hurt the baby.

On December 20, 1949, Barbara delivered a daughter, whom she named Pauline Robinson Bush, after her late mother. Initially, the child's intended name was Pauline Pierce Bush, until George H. W.'s mother pointed out that her initials would be P. P. Bush, which "would never do". From birth, the little girl was referred to as Robin, so much so that, later in life, Barbara would comment that Robin's siblings probably do not even remember her real name.

Robin was described as being calm and having a "sweet soul". She was "quiet and gentle, and she had lovely little blond curls." Her father would later say of Robin: "She'd fight and cry and play and make her way just like the rest, but there was about her a certain softness... Her peace made me feel strong, and so very important." In 1950, shortly after Robin's birth, the family relocated again, this time to Midland, Texas; the family quickly became involved in their new town. In February 1953, after having moved to their third house in Midland, the Bushes had another child, John Ellis, nicknamed "Jeb".

== Illness and death ==
In the spring of 1953, shortly after Jeb's birth, Robin awoke one morning, listless. She said she was unsure of what to do that particular morning, stating that she "may go out and lie on the grass and watch the cars go by", or just stay in bed. Barbara believed Robin had come down with what her mother had referred to as "spring fever", as, up until that point, she had been "as rowdy and healthy" as her brothers. The child was taken to the family's pediatrician, Dr. Dorothy Wyvell, who took a blood sample and told Barbara to return later that afternoon with George H. W.; Barbara had not yet noticed the bruises on Robin. Dr. Wyvell told George and Barbara that Robin had advanced stage leukemia. Her advice for them was to not tell anyone about the child's illness, and to take her home, "make life as easy as possible for her, and in three weeks' time, she'll be gone." Neither parent had ever heard of leukemia, and, in the 1950s, not much was known of it; consequently, it was nearly always fatal.

The Bushes went against both parts of the doctor's advice. Almost immediately, their friends from the country club were discussing Robin's diagnosis, and George called his uncle, John M. Walker, president of Memorial Hospital in New York City. Walker urged them to take Robin to the adjacent Sloan Kettering Institute. He told George and Barbara that "you could never live with yourselves unless you treat her." The very next day, leaving George W. and Jeb with different friends, they both flew to New York and had Robin admitted into Sloan Kettering. She was tested once again, and, after the diagnosis was confirmed, she was immediately put on medication. George W. was told that his sister was sick, but was never explained exactly how bad her condition was. For the next six months, Barbara largely remained in New York with Robin, while George traveled back and forth, due to his job. Their two sons were cared for either by family friends or by housekeepers.

Robin was, by her mother's account, "wonderful", not questioning why she was sick. She disliked bone marrow tests, which were very painful, as were many of the blood transfusions she endured. At times, the medication was so effective that Robin did not even appear to be ill. However, she never went into complete remission. According to Charlotte Tan, who treated Robin in New York, she was mature and tolerated her treatments well. Barbara and George heard about a doctor in Kansas City who maintained he had found the cure for leukemia. However, their hopes were dashed when they found out the man was merely testing a new drug, and had not claimed to have the cure. Sometimes, her parents would take Robin to the Bush house in Greenwich, Connecticut, and she was once taken to Maine for a brief period. There, she got to see her brothers, whose pictures she had taped to the headboard of her hospital bed. During this visit, George W. was not allowed to wrestle with his sister like they used to; his mother focused most of her attention on Robin and would "snap" at him if he tried to "horse around" with his sister.

By fall, Robin's condition was worsening. She spent time in an oxygen tent, and her platelets were low enough that whenever she started bleeding it was very difficult to ascertain when it would stop. Barbara allowed no crying around Robin, and made her husband leave the room if he felt like doing so. Prescott Bush, George's father, had purchased a plot for Robin to be buried in, as her situation was not improving. Eventually, due to her medication, Robin developed heavy bruising, which almost entirely covered one of her legs, and "a hundred or so" stomach ulcers. Barbara called George, and, by the time he arrived to his daughter's bedside, she had entered a coma. Robin died on October 11, 1953, after doctors' efforts to close the ulcers in her stomach. She was two months short of her fourth birthday. Two days later, on October 13, a memorial service was held for Robin at the Bushes' home in Greenwich. Initially, her body was donated for research, in hopes that her death might help others survive. Several days later, when the hospital released her remains, Dorothy Walker Bush, her paternal grandmother, was among those who buried her.

== Legacy ==
After Robin's death at age 3, Barbara cried herself to sleep many nights. She stated that she "crumbled" completely, and would later say that she "fell totally apart and [George] took care of [her]." George W. was told of his sister's death a few days after it happened, when his parents picked him up from school. He would later describe this as the only low point of his happy childhood, remembering the sadness he felt both for his parents and for the loss of his sister. He and his brother Jeb then became their mother's focal points, and she devoted her time to caring for them, as a means of overcoming her daughter's death.

After overhearing George W. tell one of his friends that he could not go out and play, as he needed to play with his mother, Barbara decided that it was time to heal, for her family. After a few months, "the grief and the awful aching hurt began to disappear." "I like... to think of Robin as though she were a part, a living part, of our vital energetic and wonderful family of men and [Barbara]," George H. W. Bush would later write. Barbara came to believe that she and her husband valued all people more because of the loss they suffered with Robin. Barbara also attributed the premature graying of her hair to Robin's extended illness and death.

Dorothy Walker Bush commissioned an oil painting of Robin, which hung in the Bushes' homes in Midland and, later, Houston. Eventually, Barbara and George H. W. had three more children: Neil, in 1955, Marvin in 1956, and another daughter, Dorothy, known as "Doro" and born in 1959. Doro was once described by her father as "a wild dark version of Robin", noting that the two looked so much alike, her parents once mistakenly called her Robin. In 2000, Robin's remains were transferred from Connecticut to the family's future burial plot at the George H. W. Bush Presidential Library in Texas. On this occasion, George H. W. stated: "It seems funny after almost 50 years since her death how dear Robin is to our hearts."

Following Robin's death, the Bush family created a charity to raise awareness and money for leukemia research called the Bright Star Foundation. The impact of the Bright Star Foundation was acknowledged by the University of Texas MD Anderson Cancer Center in 2004, when it opened the Robin Bush Child and Adolescent Clinic. Barbara later became honorary chairwoman of the Leukemia & Lymphoma Society and honorary national chairperson of Donor Awareness Week.

Following Barbara's death in April 2018, a cartoon by Marshall Ramsey, of The Clarion-Ledger, was widely circulated, showing Robin greeting Barbara upon the latter's entry to heaven. The cartoon was shared by various people and relatives of the family, including George W.'s daughter, Jenna Bush Hager. Following her father's death in November of that same year, Robin would be featured again in another Ramsey cartoon, where she and Barbara greeted George H. W. after the latter landing a TBM Avenger (the type of airplane he flew in the Navy during World War II) in heaven.
