= William Adams Delano =

American architect

- Born: January 21, 1874; New York City, New York, U.S.
- Died: January 12, 1960 (aged 85); New York City, New York, U.S.
- Education: Lawrenceville School; Yale University; Columbia University; École des Beaux-Arts
- Occupation: Architect
- Awards: AIA Gold Medal (1953)
- Practice: Delano & Aldrich
- Buildings: Kykuit; Oheka Castle; Sterling Divinity Quadrangle, Yale Divinity School

William Adams Delano (January 21, 1874 – January 12, 1960) was an American architect and a partner with Chester Holmes Aldrich in the firm of Delano & Aldrich. The firm worked in the Beaux-Arts tradition for elite clients in New York City, Long Island and elsewhere, building townhouses, country houses, clubs, banks and buildings for colleges and private schools. Moving on from the classical and baroque Beaux-Arts repertory, they often designed in the neo-Georgian and neo-Federal styles, and many of their buildings were clad in brick with limestone or white marble trim, a combination which came to be their trademark.

== Early life and education ==
Delano was born in New York City on January 21, 1874, and was a member of the Delano family of Massachusetts. His parents were Eugene Delano (1844–1920) and Susan Magoun (née Adams) Delano (1848–1904). His father was an 1866 graduate of Williams College and a partner in Brown Brothers & Company banking and trading group. Among his siblings was Moreau Delano, also a banker with Brown Brothers, and two sisters: Caroline Delano, who married Augustus B. Wadsworth (a director of the Wadsworth Center), and Susan Delano, a botanist who married Charles W. McKelvey.

His paternal grandparents were Moreau Delano and Sarah Ann (née Abrams) Delano. He was a distant cousin of President Franklin Delano Roosevelt. Through his maternal aunt, Mary Elizabeth Adams Brown, he was the nephew of John Crosby Brown, the head of Brown Brothers & Company. Mary Elizabeth Adams (Brown) was the minister William Adams sister, who was Delano's maternal grandfather, and for whom he was named. The minister William Adams' wife was Martha Bradshaw Magoun, who was the maternal grandmother of Delano, and she was the daughter of Thatcher Magoun (associated with the Thatcher Magoun clipper and 60 State Street) and Mary Bradshaw. Previously the minister William Adams was married to Susan Patten Magoun, sister of Martha Bradshaw, before Susan Patten died. A further connection between the families resides in the offspring of John Crosby Brown and Mary Elizabeth's six children, with a son Thatcher Magoun Brown named in honor of Thatcher Magoun, along with daughter Mary Magoun Brown, and their eldest child William Adams Brown, who like Delano was also named in honor of their grandfather the minister William Adams. Furthermore, Delano's father Eugene had made partner with the Philadelphia house of Brown Brothers & Co., meanwhile his mothers middle name is Magoun.

Delano was educated at the Lawrenceville School and Yale University, where he served on the editorial board of campus humor magazine The Yale Record and was a member of Scroll and Key, and Columbia University's school of architecture. He also studied at the École des Beaux-Arts in Paris, receiving a diploma in 1903.

== Career ==
He met his longstanding partner, Chester Holmes Aldrich, when they worked together at the office of Carrère and Hastings in the years before the turn of the 20th century. They formed their partnership after Delano's return from Europe in 1903 and almost immediately won commissions from the Rockefeller family, among others. Delano & Aldrich tended to adapt conservative Georgian and Federal architectural styles for its townhouses, churches, schools, and a spate of social clubs for the Astors, Vanderbilts, and the Whitneys. Separately (Delano was the more prolific) and in tandem they designed a number of buildings at Yale. Delano taught at Columbia University from 1903 to 1910.

Delano alone won the commission for the second-largest residence in the United States, Oheka, overlooking Cold Spring Harbor on Long Island, New York for financier Otto Kahn. Built from 1914 to 1919 in French chateau style, with gardens by Olmsted Brothers, Oheka ranges over 109,000 square feet (10,000 m^{2}) and was staffed with 125 people.

In 1922, Delano designed the interiors of the Grand Central Art Galleries, an artists' cooperative established that year by John Singer Sargent, Edmund Greacen, Walter Leighton Clark, and others. Eight years later Delano and Aldrich were asked by the organization to design the U.S. Pavilion at the Venice Biennale. The purchase of the land, design, and construction was paid for by the Galleries and personally supervised by Clark. As he wrote in the 1934 catalog:

Pursuing our purpose of putting American art prominently before the world, the directors a few years ago appropriated the sum of $25,000 for the erection of an exhibition building in Venice on the grounds of the International Biennial. Messrs. Delano and Aldrich generously donated the plans for this building which is constructed of Istrian marble and pink brick and more than holds its own with the twenty-five other buildings in the Park owned by the various European governments.

The pavilion, owned and operated by the Galleries, opened on May 4, 1930. It was sold to the Museum of Modern Art in 1954 and later to the Guggenheim Museum.

Delano's sense of humor was expressed in some his architectural details and friezes, such as the low-relief frieze of tortoises and hares in the apartment block at 1040 Park Avenue, and backgammon club rooms ornamented like backgammon boards. At the Marine Air Terminal at LaGuardia Airport, built for Pan American Airways' transatlantic seaplane service in 1939 and the oldest such passenger air facility still in use, his Art Deco terra cotta friezes feature flying fish. "There is as much that is new to be said in architecture today by a man of imagination who employs traditional motifs as there is in literature by an author, who, to express his thought, still employs the English language," Delano wrote in 1928.

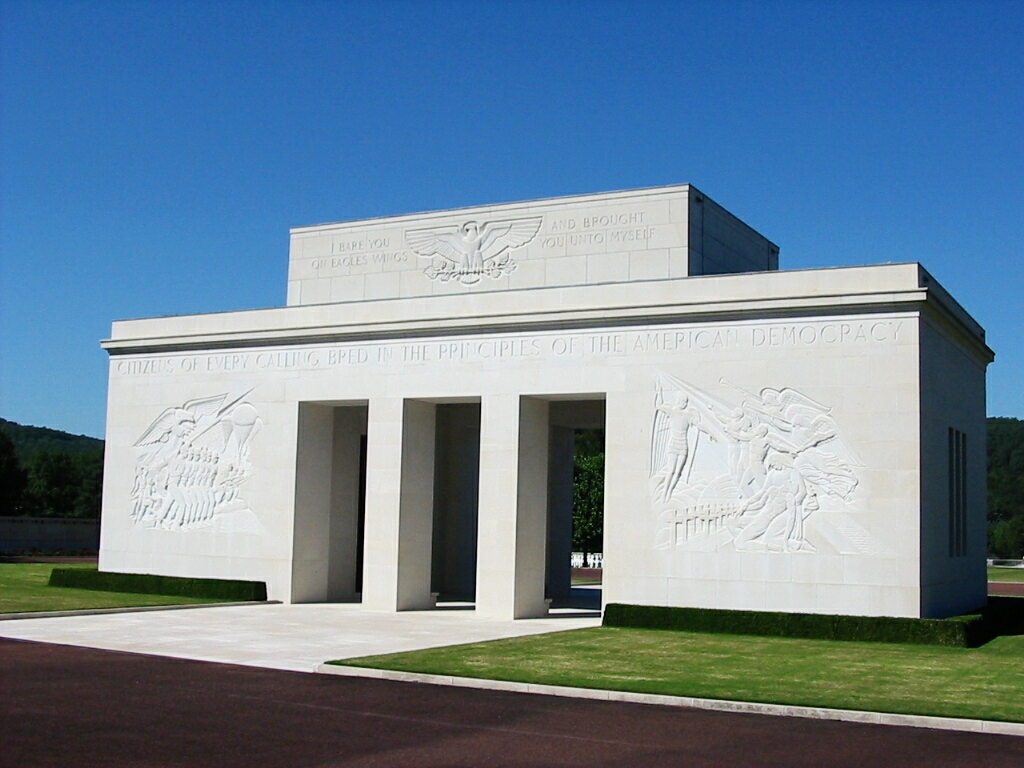
Epinal American Memorial

In Washington, D.C., Delano was the architect for the 1927 renovation to the White House, which later led to structural problems and rebuilding during the Truman Administration. (See White House Reconstruction.) He served on the National Capital Planning Commission and the U.S. Commission of Fine Arts from 1924 to 1928, including a term as vice chairman in 1928. This service led to his firm receiving the design contract for the New Post Office building, completed in 1934, in the Federal Triangle complex. Delano served on the board of design for the 1939 New York World's Fair and consulted on the controversial White House Truman Balcony in 1946, prior to the reconstruction project of 1949–52.

Delano's awards and honors include election to the American Academy of Arts and Letters and the National Institute of Arts and Letters in 1940. In 1948, Delano was commissioned to design the Epinal American Cemetery and Memorial (1948–56), one of fourteen World War II monuments constructed abroad by the American Battle Monuments Commission. Delano also designed terminals at La Guardia and Miami airports.

He was named an officer by the French Legion of Honour and was an academician of the National Academy of Design. In 1953, the American Institute of Architects awarded William Adams Delano its Gold Medal.

Delano continued to practice almost until his death in 1960. Aldrich had left the partnership in 1935 to become the resident director of the American Academy at Rome.

== Marriage and descendants ==
Delano married Louisa Millicent Sheffield (née Potter) on May 23, 1907. His son, William Richard Potter Delano, was born on July 31, 1909. His son married Dorothea Frances Lehmann in October 1939.

Delano died on January 12, 1960, aged 85, in New York City.
