= William Adams Brown =

American minister, professor and philanthropist (1865-1943)

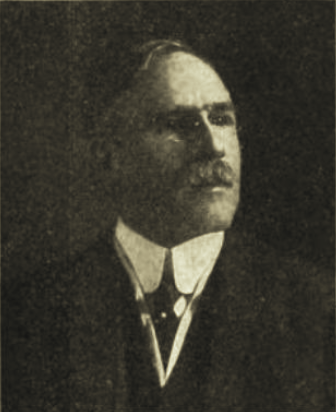
- William Adams Brown
- Born: December 29, 1865; New York City, United States
- Died: December 15, 1943 (aged 77); New York City, United States
- Education: St. Paul's School; Yale University; Union Theological Seminary
- Spouse: Helen Gilman Noyes (m. 1892)
- Children: 4, including son Winthrop Gilman "Bob" Brown
- Parents: John Crosby Brown (father); Mary Elizabeth Adams Brown (mother)
- Relatives: Descendants of Robert Coe

William Adams Brown (December 29, 1865 – December 15, 1943) was an American minister, professor and philanthropist.

== Early life ==
Brown was born in New York City on December 29, 1865, and named after his maternal grandfather, the Rev. William Adams. He was the eldest son of John Crosby Brown and Mary Elizabeth Adams Brown. His siblings were Eliza Coe Adams, Mary Magoun Brown, James Crosby Brown, Thatcher Magoun Brown, and Amy Brighthurst Brown (1878–1960).

His father was a merchant banker and partner in Brown Bros. & Co., an investment bank founded by his grandfather and grand-uncles, including George Brown and Sir William Brown, 1st Baronet.

Brown graduated from St. Paul's School in Concord, New Hampshire before attending Yale University where he received an A.B. degree in 1886, an A.M. degree in 1888 and a PhD in 1901. He also graduated from Union Theological Seminary in 1890 and was ordained in the Presbyterian Church in 1893. He also studied with Adolf von Harnack at the University of Berlin from 1890 to 1892.

== Career ==
After returning to the United States in 1892, Brown joined the faculty of Union Theological Seminary as an instructor of Church History. Less than a year later, he was asked him to shift fields and teach Systematic Theology. Within five years, he was named Roosevelt Chair of Systematic Theology. He retired in 1936.

Brown served as chairman of the Presbyterian Church's Home Missions Committee, through which he organized and ran the American Parish on the Upper East Side and the Labor Temple in the East Village neighborhoods of Manhattan. He was also instrumental in the founding of Union Settlement in East Harlem where he was largely responsible for fundraising. Union Settlement is one of the oldest settlement houses in New York City and is East Harlem's largest social service agency serving the poor.

He was a member of the Yale Corporation from 1917 to 1934, and was acting president of Yale University from 1919 to 1920.

== Personal life ==
In 1892, Brown was married to Helen Gilman Noyes (1867–1942), a daughter of Daniel Rogers Noyes and Helen Abia (née Gilman) Noyes. The family lived at 49 East 80th Street in New York City and had a summer home on Mount Desert Island in Maine where they befriended many prominent people, including Charles W. Eliot, president of Harvard, Seth Low, president of Columbia and later Mayor of New York, and John D. Rockefeller Jr. They had four children:

- John Crosby Brown (1892–1950), the president of Tamblyn & Brown, a public relations counsel and managers of fund-raising campaigns.
- William Adams Brown Jr. (1894–1957)
- Winthrop Gilman "Bob" Brown (1907–1987), who served as United States Ambassador to Laos and Korea.
- Helen Adams Brown (1910–1928), who contracted infantile paralysis just before she was to begin college at Vassar College and died six days later.

Brown died in New York City on December 15, 1943.
