= William Adams (minister) =

American clergyman and academic (1807–1880)

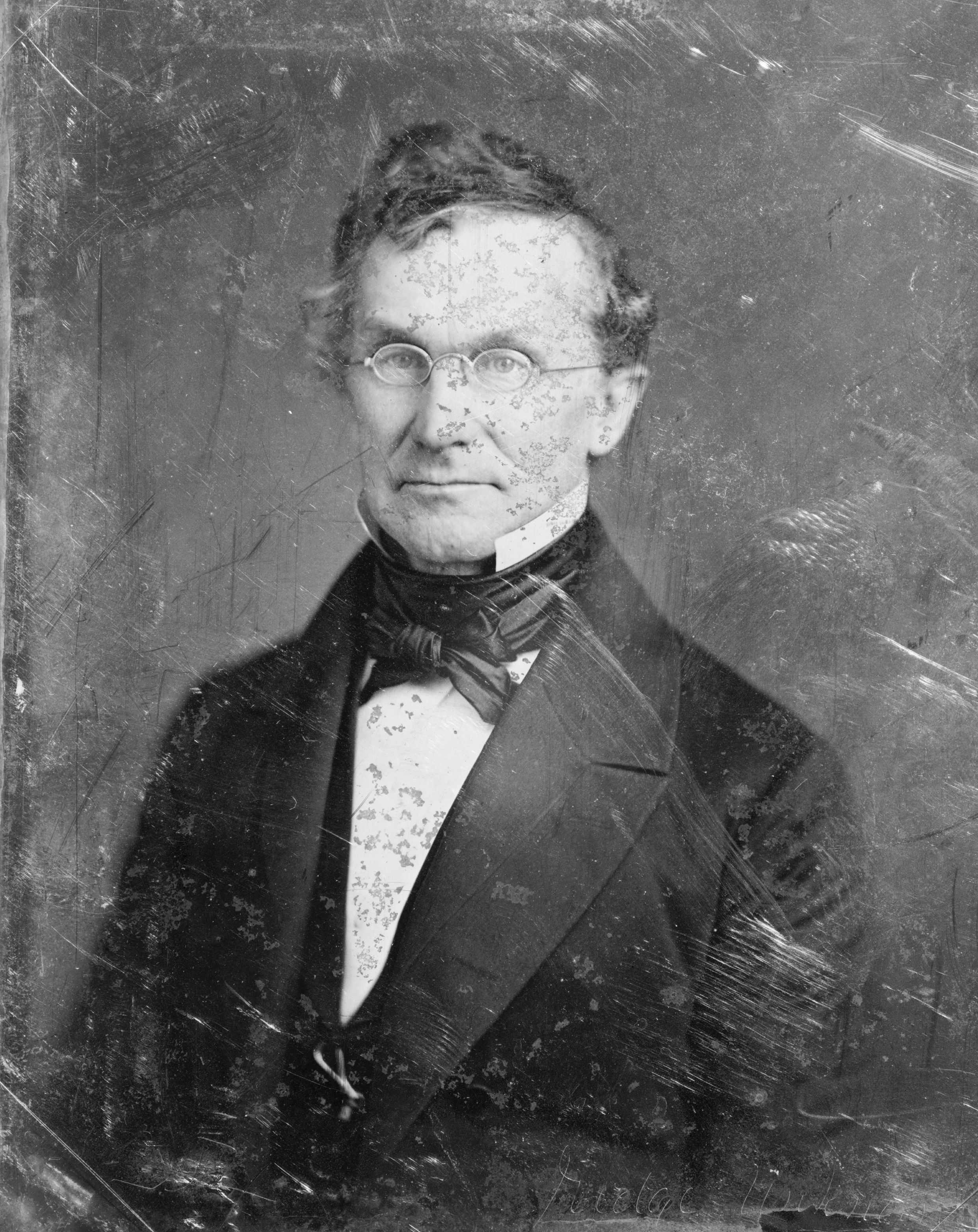
- Photograph of Adams, c. 1844 – c. 1860
- Born: January 25, 1807; Colchester, Connecticut, U.S.
- Died: August 31, 1880 (aged 73); Orange Mountain, New Jersey, U.S.
- Education: Phillips Academy; Yale College; Andover Theological Seminary; New York City University (D.D.); Princeton College (LL.D.)
- Spouses: Susan Patten Magoun (m. 1831; died 1834) Martha Bradshaw Magoun (m. 1835)
- Parents: John Adams (father); Elizabeth Ripley Adams (mother)
- Relatives: William Adams Delano (grandson); William Adams Brown (grandson)

William Adams (January 25, 1807 – August 31, 1880) was a noted American clergyman and academic.

== Early life ==
He was born in Colchester, Connecticut on January 25, 1807. He was one of five sons and six daughters born to John Adams (1772–1863) and Elizabeth (née Ripley) Adams (1776–1829). His father was a 1795 graduate of Yale who was an American educator noted for organizing several hundred Sunday schools.

His father was the eldest of ten children born to Captain John Adams, a farmer from Canterbury and an officer during the American Revolution and Mary (née Parker) Adams of Needham, Massachusetts. Her maternal grandparents were Gamaliel Ripley and Judith (née Perkins) Riply. His mother was a great-great-granddaughter of Governor William Bradford of the Plymouth Colony who was a passenger on the Mayflower.

He prepared for college at Phillips Academy in Andover, Massachusetts. In 1827, he graduated from Yale College, after having been one of the students suspended in the 1825 Conic Sections Rebellion. He studied for the ministry at Andover Theological Seminary, under Professor Moses Stuart, graduating in 1830. The University of the city of New York gave him the degree of D.D. in 1842, and Princeton College that of LL.D. in 1869.

== Career ==
In February 1831, he was ordained as pastor of the Congregational Church in Brighton, Massachusetts, where he remained until April 1834. In August 1834, he took charge of the Central Presbyterian Church on Broome Street in New York City.

In 1836, he was a member of the group that founded Union Theological Seminary in New York City. In 1852, he served as the moderator of the New School Party, and was chairman of the New School Committee of Conferences in 1866. He also served as a member of the American Board of Commissioners for Foreign Missions, and as the president of the Presbyterian Foreign Board. He was also president of the New York Institution for the Deaf and Dumb.

In 1853 his congregation founded the Madison Square Presbyterian Church. While there, Adams baptized Edward Huntting Rudd. In 1871, Adams was sent by the evangelical alliance to intercede with the emperor of Russia in behalf of dissenters from the Greek church in the Baltic provinces, who claimed religious liberty, his mission being entirely successful, and the same year served as delegate from the general assembly of the Presbyterian church in America to the general assembly in Scotland, and to the Free Church assembly.

He resigned to pastorate in 1873, after nearly forty years of consecutive service in one church, to accept the presidency of the Union Theological Seminary, in 1874, in connection with the professorship of sacred rhetoric and pastoral theology. He was there a leader of the new-school board of the Presbyterian church, and in its efforts to reunite the two bodies, was a chief advocate.

Dr. Adams delivered the address of welcome at the great gathering of representatives of the various Protestant churches of the world, at an evangelical alliance in New York City October 3, 1873. At the general council of the Presbyterian church, held at Edinburgh in 1877, he responded to the address of welcome by the lord provost of that city.

== Personal life ==
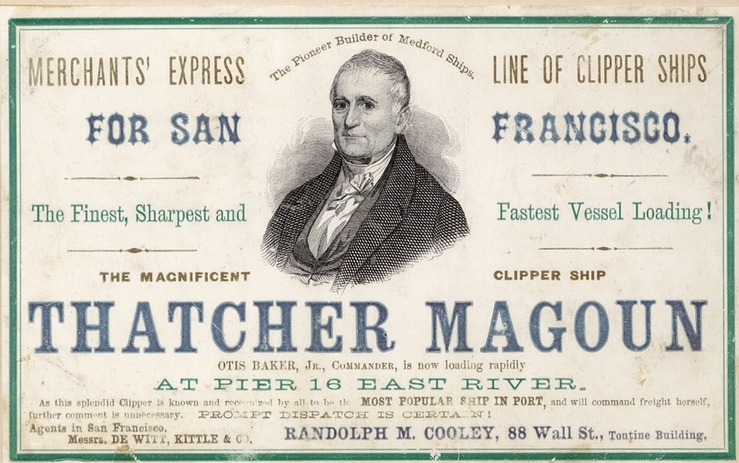
Clipper ship Thatcher Magoun

On July 13, 1831, he married Susan Patten Magoun (1806–1834), the daughter of Thatcher Magoun and Mary Bradshaw. Following the death of his first wife (on May 22, 1834), he married her sister, Martha Bradshaw Magoun (1812–1885) on August 12, 1835. Together, Adams and his second wife Martha were the parents of:

- William Adams (1836–1836), who died in infancy.
- Mary Elizabeth Adams (1842–1918), who married John Crosby Brown (1838–1909), an 1859 Columbia graduate who became the senior partner of Brown Bros, in New York City on November 9, 1864. John was the son of Eliza Maria (née Coe) Brown and James Brown, a banker and founder of the family company Brown Bros. & Co. (Note: Brown Bros. & Co. merged in 1931 with Harriman Brothers & Company to become Brown Brothers Harriman & Co., one of the oldest and largest partnership banks in the United States.)
- Susan Magoun Adams (1848–1904), who married Eugene Delano (1844–1920) of the prominent Massachusetts Delano family.
- Henry Stewart Adams (1849–1852), who died in childhood.

He died on August 31, 1880, at Orange Mountain, New Jersey. He was buried at Mount Auburn Cemetery, Cambridge, Massachusetts.

=== Descendants ===
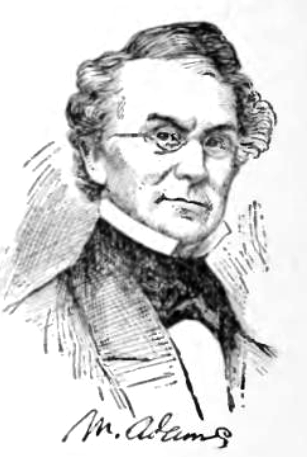
Signature of Dr. William Adams

Adams was the grandfather of William Adams Brown (1865–1943). The latter was born in New York City and was educated privately at first, then went to St. Paul's School in Concord, New Hampshire. He received from Yale University an A.B. degree in 1886, an A.M. degree in 1888, and a Ph.D. in 1901. He graduated from Union Theological Seminary in 1890 and was ordained in the Presbyterian Church in 1893. He also studied at the University of Berlin from 1890 to 1892. He was a member of the Yale Corporation from 1917 to 1934, and was acting president of Yale University from 1919 to 1920.

Another grandson was William Adams Delano (January 21, 1874 – January 12, 1960), a cousin of Franklin Delano Roosevelt and an 1895 graduate of Yale who was a prominent American architect, and a partner with Chester Holmes Aldrich in the firm of Delano & Aldrich, which worked in the Beaux-Arts tradition for elite clients in New York City and Long Island.

== Works ==
He wrote several religious books and edited the works of Robert Hall (1830).

His published works include:

- The Three Gardens: Eden, Gethsemane, and Paradise (1859)
- The Spirit of Hebrew Poetry (1861)
- Thanksgiving: Memories of the Day and Helps to the Habit (1865)
- Conversations of Jesus Christ with Representative Men (1868)

Religious titles
| Preceded by The Rev. Albert Barnes | Moderator of the 58th General Assembly (New School) of the Presbyterian Church in the United States of America; 1852–1853 | Succeeded by The Rev. Diarca Howe Allen |
