= Helen Gilman Brown =

American philanthropist

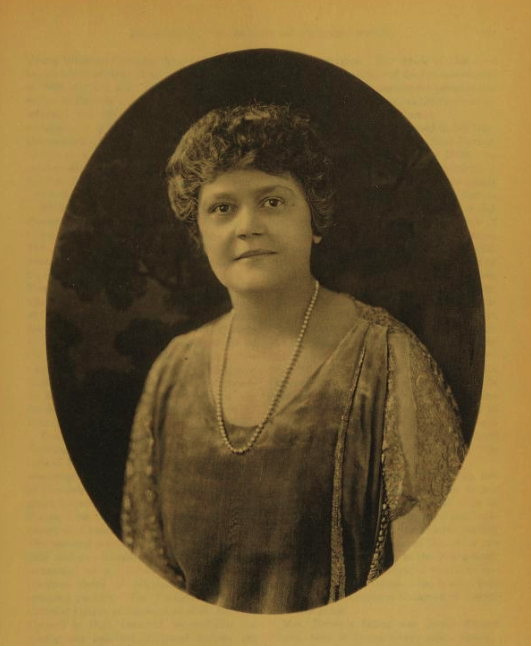
- Born: Helen Gilman Noyes; October 12, 1867; New York City, U.S.
- Died: December 12, 1942 (aged 75); New York City, U.S.
- Education: Miss Porter's School
- Occupation: Philanthropist
- Spouse: William Adams Brown (m. 1892)
- Children: 4, including Winthrop Gilman "Bob" Brown
- Relatives: James Noyes; Richard Warren; William Coddington; Anne Hutchinson; Edward Dorr Griffin; Thomas Mayhew

Signature
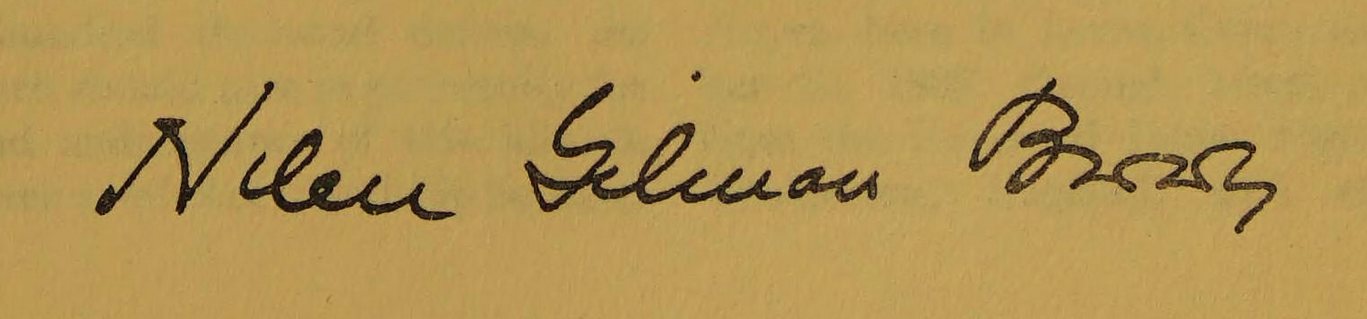

Helen Gilman Brown (née Noyes; October 12, 1867 – December 12, 1942) was an American philanthropist. She had a distinguished record of service to New York City. As social worker for years at the Union Settlement of the Upper East Side, her long service record was recognized in 1919 when she was elected to membership in the National Institute of Social Sciences. She served as patronal president, Woman's Land Army of America, 1918; and as first vice-president, National War Work Council of the Young Women’s Christian Association (YWCA). She was a co-founder and first president of the Cosmopolitan Club of New York. As a clubwoman and as a Vice-Chair of the Sulgrave Endowment Committee of the National Society of the Colonial Dames of America, she demonstrated an aptitude for organization and financial acumen as well as the sympathetic training in living together. She was an ardent advocate of the League of Nations and of work for world peace.

== Early life and education ==
Helen Gilman Noyes was born in New York City, October 12, 1867, or 1868, the daughter of Daniel Rogers Noyes and his wife, Helen Adia Gilman Noyes. Her ancestry from both parents descended from New England families of Colonial ancestry. Brown's siblings were Winthrop, Evelyn, Caroline, Josphine, and Daniel Raymond.

Daniel Rogers Noyes, born in Lyme, Connecticut, November 10, 1836, through whom she descended from the Reverend James Noyes, rector at Cholderton, England, who emigrated to Boston, 1634. His son, of the same name, also her ancestor, after being graduated from Harvard in the Class of 1638, helped to found Yale University and was one of the first trustees. Brown was tenth in descent from Richard Warren, twelfth signer of the Mayflower Compact; seventh in descent from William Coddington, first governor of colonial Rhode Island; eighth in descent from Anne Hutchinson, pioneer in the movement for the intellectual freedom of women, who came to Boston with Governor John Winthrop and was commemorated by a statue in the Boston Public Library; and is a great grandniece of Edward Dorr Griffin, president of Williams College. Through her mother, Helen Adia Gilman, Brown descended from Governor Thomas Mayhew, lord of the manor of Nantucket, Martha’s Vineyard and the Elizabeth Islands; from the Reverend Chandler Robbins of Plymouth Colony; and from George Bethune, who arrived in Boston in 1710 and through whom Brown has a strain of French ancestry.

Brown had associations with the eastern and with the western parts of the U.S. The failure of her father’s health forced him to leave New York and much of her childhood and early girlhood was spent in the climate of Minnesota.

At the age of fourteen, she was sent back to her father’s state of Connecticut to continue her education at Miss Porter's School conducted by Sarah Porter, sister of Noah Porter, president of Yale College, at Farmington, Connecticut . Brown and her cousin, Katherine Ludington, were roommates at this school and passed some happy years in the old village. On leaving school, Brown spent a winter in Vienna, to continue the musical instruction begun under Karl Klauser at Farmington. In Vienna, she worked under the direction of Theodor Leschetizky. With a friend, Eliza Coe Brown of New York, who later became her sister-in-law, Brown enjoyed life in that city. Through the kindness of the United States minister, Mr. Phelps, the two young Americans were admitted to certain court functions.

== Career ==
Upon her return to the U.S., Brown paid a visit to Hull House, then at the height of its notability as a center of social work. Jane Addams was at that time the most powerful exponent of a new ideal in philanthropy. This visit, though brief, constituted the turning point in Brown’s life and the impressions received there controlled her interests and activities for many years.

On March 30, 1892, she married William Adams Brown, Ph.D., D.D., of New York, clergyman, author, professor, Fellow of Yale University and patron of the Metropolitan Museum of Art. William, eldest son of John Crosby Brown and Mary Elizabeth Adams Brown, was one of the founders of the Union Settlement and into this new enterprise, Brown entered with determination. For years, the promotion of the interests of the Union Settlement was her chief preoccupation. She helped to form the first Woman's Auxiliary and was for some time its president.

When Brown became president of the newly formed Cosmopolitan Club of New York in 1909, she brought to the position no experience in the technical art of club management — but much training in the human art of living together. The club was under the guidance of a group of creative women who made personality the test of eligibility and who desired that the charm and interest of the clubhouse and the club life should be due directly to the personal contribution of the members. With such purposes, Brown was in entire sympathy, and the years of her presidency made her happy. Her gift of drawing many women together for joint effort found its fullest scope and, as a result of the harmony which existed among its leaders, the Cosmopolitan Club was soon established in unique and attractive quarters, with an enviable reputation and adequate financial resources. She was the author of The Story of a New England Schoolmaster, 1900.

=== World War I ===
The outbreak of World War I brought a call to heavier responsibilities. Entering with enthusiasm into the plans of the National War Work Council of the YWCA, Brown became its publicity chair and later its vice-chair, serving as its head in the absence of the chair in Europe. (Note: During something over two years of existence, the National War Work Council received from the U.S. through the National Board of the YWCA almost US$22,000,000, probably the largest sum ever entrusted to women for expenditure in the history of the world. See the official reports issued in 1918 from Young Women’s Christian Association headquarters, 600 Lexington Avenue, New York.)

At the request of the War Work Council, Brown crossed the Atlantic in 1918 to inspect the stations established by it in France for the use of the French women munition workers, of the Signal Corps operators of the U.S. Army, for the U.S. Red Cross nurses in many hospitals, and for certain employees of the French Ministry of War. With Mrs. Herbert Lee Pratt, Mrs. Francis McNeil Bacon and others, Brown reported at headquarters to General John J. Pershing, Commander-in-Chief of the U.S. Army, on the work carried on by the YWCA for the women connected with the U.S. army. (Note: The uniform worn by Brown when making this report, can be seen at the National Museum at Washington, as a part of the collection of war uniforms worn in service by American women, which was arranged by a committee of the National Society of Colonial Dames of America.)

The U.S. Government not only appealed for economy in the use of food during the war, but also for its production in larger quantities. In order to aid the farmer to obtain additional seasonal labor at a moderate price and thereby facilitate increased food production, an emergency organization of women was formed called Woman's Land Army of America. This organization accomplished results of undoubted value. Groups or "units" of young women were formed, drawn mostly from the ranks of industrial workers or from the colleges. In 1918, such "units" existed in 21 states with an enrollment of more than 1,500 "farmerettes". Many farmers were ready to accept gratefully the help they offered; and the capacity of women to perform efficiently various sorts of farm work was well demonstrated. The possibilities of a career in agricultural work were set before the minds of a large number of young women, who, after the close of the war, chose to devote themselves to such pursuits. Brown was the National President of this organization during the last year of the war and worked in intimate cooperation with the Department of Labor at Washington, D.C.

=== Post-war ===
At the close of hostilities, Brown remained with the YWCA as the national finance chair of the National Board. The country was exhausted by its vast war effort and was temporarily unresponsive to altruistic appeals. The raising of the annual budget presented exceptional difficulties. Brown made speaking tours throughout the country and pleaded for continued support of the work conducted by the YWCA, for self-supporting young women.

It was not until 1922 that she could take a much-needed rest. In the summer of that year, she went to Europe with her family and served through the following winter as a member of the World’s Committee of the YWCA, headquartered at London. In the spring of 1923, Brown was sent by the World’s Committee to Paris as the American member of an informal delegation, the English members of which were the Countess of Portsmouth and Lady Parmoor. The object of this mission was to lay before leading French women some aspects of the international situation in the Ruhr.

While still in England, Brown was chosen president of the National Society of Colonial Dames in the State of New York. Brown was shortly after appointed National Chair of the Sulgrave Endowment Committee of the Colonial Dames by Mrs. Joseph Lamar, the president of the National Society of Colonial Dames of America.

Brown was a co-founder of the Cosmopolitan Club. She was a member of the Colony Club, Albemarle Club (London), Colonial Lords of the Manor, Colonial Dames, Mayflower Club, National Institute of Social Science, and the World’s Committee of YWCA.

== Personal life ==
The family lived at 49 East 80th Street in New York City and had a summer home on Mount Desert Island in Maine where they befriended many prominent people, including Charles William Eliot, president of Harvard University, Seth Low, president of Columbia University and later Mayor of New York City, and John D. Rockefeller Jr. Brown was deeply attached to her summer home "The Tree-Tops" at Seal Harbor, Maine, where she lived since 1900. She and her husband were leaders in building and sustaining a church for the village of Seal Harbor and she was also the first to start a movement for a kindergarten.

The Browns had four children:

- John Crosby Brown (1892–1950), the president of Tamblyn & Brown, a public relations counsel and managers of fund-raising campaigns.
- William Adams Brown Jr. (1894–1957)
- Winthrop G. Brown (1907–1987), who served as United States Ambassador to Laos and Korea.
- Helen Adams Brown (1910–1928), who contracted infantile paralysis just before she was to begin college at Vassar College and died six days later.

Helen Gilman Brown died at her home, 1105 Park Avenue in Manhattan, New York City, December 12, 1942, aged 75.

== Selected works ==
- The Story of a New England Schoolmaster, 1900
