= Theodoor Gilissen Bankiers =

- Native name: Theodoor Gilissen Bankiers N.V.
- Industry: Financial services
- Founded: 1881
- Defunct: 2017
- Fate: Merged
- Successor: Insinger Gilissen
- Headquarters: Keizersgracht 617, 1017 DS Amsterdam, Netherlands
- Key people: Tanja Nagel (Chairman)
- Website: www.gilissen.nl

Theodoor Gilissen Bankiers was a private bank in the Netherlands that focused on the asset management, portfolio advisory services for wealthy individuals and providing services to independent asset managers. It was merged with Insinger de Beaufort in 2017 to form Insinger Gilissen. The bank had branches in The Hague, Amsterdam, Enschede, Groningen, Rotterdam and Eindhoven.

== History ==
On 1 February 1881 Theodorus Antonius Josephus Gilissen (1858-1918) founded the Theodoor Gilissen Bankiers. Until 1962 the bank operated as an independent company, then it became a corporation. In 1967 the bank became a part of the Bank Mees and Hope, later MeesPierson. MeesPierson was in turn owned by ABN AMRO. In 1997 MeesPierson was sold by ABN Amro to Dutch-Belgian group Fortis, and Theodoor Gilissen was included in the transaction. In 2003 Theodoor Gilissen was sold to KBL European Private Bankers (KBL EPB), now known as Quintet Private Bank.

In 2011, KBC sold its European private banking branch KBL EPB, including Theodoor Gilissen, to Precision Capital from Luxembourg for more than €1 billion. The latter is a Luxembourg entity that represents the interests of a group of private investors from Qatar. KBC had been working for years to divest KBL EPB by order of the European Commission. In 2008, KBC was only able to survive thanks to a capital injection by the state of €3.5 billion. In May 2010, the Indian bank Hinduja already offered €1.35 billion for KBL EPB, but the Luxembourg financial regulator blocked this transaction.

In April 2016, KBL EPB and BNP Paribas Wealth Management concluded an agreement to acquire Insinger de Beaufort. In May 2016 it was announced that Theodoor Gilissen Bankiers and Insinger de Beaufort would merge.

== See also ==
- List of banks in the Netherlands
