= George Brown (financier) =

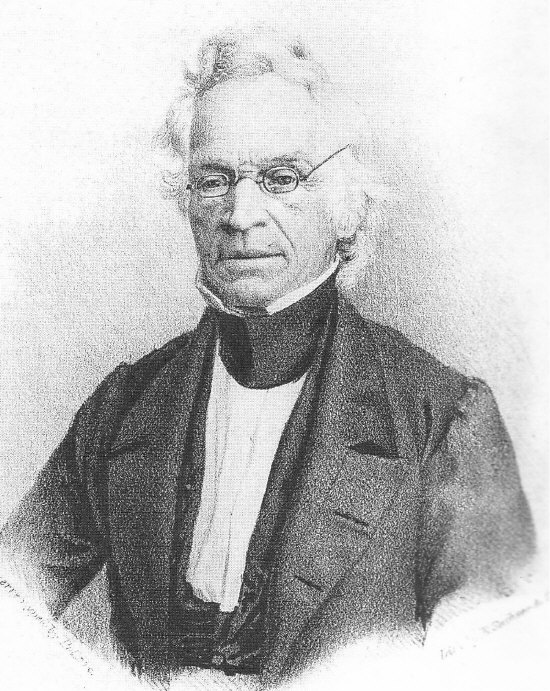
- Lithograph of Brown at B&O Railroad Museum, 1853
- Born: August 17, 1787; Ballymena, County Antrim, Ireland
- Died: August 26, 1859 (aged 72); Baltimore, Maryland, U.S.
- Spouse: Isabella McLanahan (m. 1818)
- Children: 7
- Parent(s): Alexander Brown; Grace Davison Brown
- Relatives: Sir William Brown (brother); John Crosby Brown (nephew)

George Brown (August 17, 1787 – August 26, 1859) was an Irish-American investment banker and railroad entrepreneur.

== Early life ==
Brown was born on August 17, 1787, in Ballymena in County Antrim, Kingdom of Ireland. He was the second son of banker Alexander Brown (1764–1834) and Grace (née Davison) Brown (1759–1843). His elder brother was William Brown (who later became the 1st Baronet of Richmond Hill) and his younger brothers were John Brown and James Brown.

He emigrated from Ulster to Baltimore, Maryland, at the age of 15 in 1802.

== Career ==
Brown served as a private in Capt. Henry Thompson's First Baltimore Horse Artillery (aka Capt. Thompson's Co of Cavalry, MD Militia) defended Baltimore from the British attack during the War of 1812 at the Battle of Baltimore with its Bombardment of Fort McHenry, the Battle of North Point in the southeastern reaches of surrounding, then rural Baltimore County on the Patapsco Neck peninsula, and the stand-off at Loudenschlager's Hill/Hampstead Hill (now Patterson Park) in East Baltimore, on September 12-13-14, 1814. Brown was also the personal guard of Maj. Gen. Samuel Smith, commander of the 3rd Division.

In 1834, after the failure of the Bank of Maryland, thousands of citizens rioted in what became known as the Baltimore bank riot. Brown joined up with Capt. Henry Thompson again as a First lieutenant in the City Horse Guards, which were formed in October 1835.

=== Banking career ===
Brown joined his father in the family business, Alex. Brown & Sons, which became one of the leading investment banks in the U.S. in the nineteenth century. His father had started the business in 1800 importing Irish linen and exporting cotton and tobacco back to Britain and was also instrumental in the Second Bank of the United States. As his elder brother, a Liberal Member of Parliament, had founded the banking house of Brown, Shipley & Co., George succeeded his father as head of Alex. Brown & Sons upon his death in 1834.

In 1818, George partnered with his younger brother John in starting the firm of Brown Bros. & Co. in Philadelphia, Pennsylvania. His youngest brother James opened an affiliate in New York City in 1825 under the name Brown Brothers, and another in Boston in 1845. These firms were later merged under the name Brown Bros. & Co. and James's son, John Crosby Brown became a driving force for growth, making Wall Street in New York the center for operations and seeing the bank become major lenders to the textile, commodities, and transportation industries. In 1931, the firm merged with Harriman Brothers & Company to form Brown Brothers Harriman & Co., which today is the oldest, and one of the largest, private banks in the United States.

In 1827, when bad management almost reduced the Mechanics Bank, of which he was the principal founder, to insolvency, Brown stepped in to become its president, and turned the bank around in a short time.

=== Baltimore and Ohio Railroad ===
George Brown had a prominent role in the founding of the Baltimore and Ohio Railroad (B&O), the first common carrier railroad in the U.S. On February 12, 1827, he hosted a meeting at his Baltimore home for 24 leading merchants, where Philip E. Thomas joined Brown in advocating the formation of a railroad to make Baltimore competitive with other eastern seaboard ports. Concerned at the potential effect of canals, particularly the successful Erie Canal (completed in 1825) and others being planned, such as the C&O Canal to Washington, D.C., he served on the committee which studied the development of railroads in Great Britain.

At a subsequent meeting in Brown's house (near where Baltimore's City Hall now stands), the committee concluded that the then-unproven technology of a long-haul railroad was feasible and that considerable trade "would flow into the State of Maryland, upon the proposed Rail Road," the committee's report concluded. The state agreed, approving a charter for the B&O Railroad on March 13, 1827. Thereafter, the Mechanics Bank of Baltimore, where George Brown and Philip E. Thomas were officers, had a leading role in the financing and sale of B&O stock for the construction of the first railroad in the U.S. Brown was subsequently elected as the B&O's first treasurer.

== Personal life ==
On December 17, 1818, Brown was married to Isabella McLanahan (1798–1885) in Greencastle, Pennsylvania. Isabella was the daughter of John McLanahan and Elizabeth (née Johnston) McLanahan. In 1850, he bought a large estate in Baltimore known as "Mondawmin" from the estate of Dr. Patrick Macaulay. Together, they were the parents of seven children, four of whom survived to adulthood:

- Alexander Brown (1819–1819), who died in infancy.
- Elizabeth Brown (1820–1830), died in childhood.
- Alexander Davison Brown (1823–1892), who married Colegate-Die Nisbet, daughter of Judge Nisbet. He later married Laura Hobson, the daughter of his father's lodge-keeper which led society to shun him. They later divorced as well.
- Grace Ann Brown (1825–1903), married Edward McDonald Greenway Jr. (1820–1895) in 1847.
- Isabella Brown (1827–1856), married William Hamilton Graham (1823–1885) in 1850. a director of Alex. Brown & Sons who acquired significant pieces of French art through George A. Lucas.
- Elizabeth Johnson Brown (1832–1847), who died aged fifteen.
- George Stewart Brown (1834–1890), married Harriet Eaton (1836–1893) in 1857. Harriet was the sister of Daniel Cady Eaton, the niece of the niece of Elizabeth Cady Stanton and the granddaughter of Amos Eaton and Daniel Cady, in 1857. He became a Brig. Gen. and paymaster general of the Maryland Militia.

Brown died at his residence in Baltimore on August 26, 1859. At his death, his estate was valued at $2,500,000 (equivalent to approximately $2.58 billion in 2025 dollars), of which about $350,000 was in real estate. In his will, he cancelled a $25,000 mortgage First Presbyterian Church in Baltimore and left $20,000 to Princeton College.

=== Legacy ===
From 1849 until his death, he was president of the House of Refuge for Juvenile Offenders, and also served as the first president of the Baltimore Association for the Improvements of the Conditions of the Poor. He was also an original trustee, appointed by George Peabody, of the Peabody Institute from its inception in 1857 until he died in 1859.

The Brown Memorial Presbyterian Church of Baltimore, Maryland, was built in 1870 in his memory, funded by Brown's wife.
