= Philip E. Thomas =

Banker and railroad executive (1776-1861)

Philip Evan Thomas
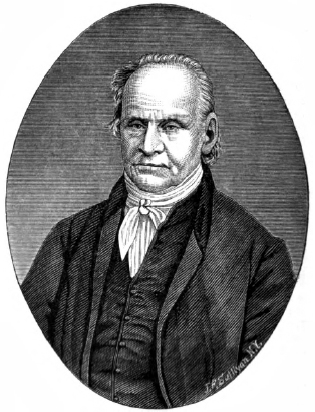
- Born: November 11, 1776; Colesville, Maryland, U.S.
- Died: September 1, 1861 (aged 84); Yonkers, New York
- Monuments: Thomas Viaduct
- Occupations: Railroad executive, banker, businessman
- Years active: 1800-1836
- Known for: First president of Baltimore and Ohio Railroad
- Spouse: Elizabeth George
- Parent(s): Evan Thomas, Rachel Hopkins

Philip Evan Thomas (November 11, 1776 – September 1, 1861) was the first president of the Baltimore and Ohio Railroad (B&O) from 1827 to 1836. He has been referred to as "The Father of American Railways". The Thomas Viaduct bridge in Relay, Maryland, was named after him.

== Biography ==
Philip was born in Mount Radnor, Colesville, Maryland, the third son of Evan and Rachel (Hopkins) Thomas. His mother was the daughter of Gerard Hopkins whose family include Samuel Hopkins and his son Johns Hopkins, the founder of Johns Hopkins University. His father was a Quaker minister.

He married Elizabeth George of Kent County, Maryland, and worked in the hardware business in Baltimore under Thomas Poultney, his brother-in-law. He commenced his own business in 1800 with Evan Thomas, Jr., his younger brother, and William George, his wife's brother. He became active in both the Baltimore community and the banking business. He served as a cashier at Mechanics' Bank, became the first president of the Mechanical Fire Company, was the founder of the Baltimore Library Company and an organizer of the State Temperance Society. Thomas donated $25,000 to the State for the Washington Monument. A prominent figure in the Society of Friends (the Quakers) from 1821-1832, he was also served chairman of the Society's Indian Affairs Committee. His efforts to help Native Americans earned him the title of "Hai-wa-nob" (the Benevolent One) from the Swan tribe of the Seneca people. Thomas was the representative to Washington for the Six Nations of Indians. (Note: The title given to Thomas was "Suguoan" (bountiful giver).) In 1822, Thomas became president of Baltimore's short lived Society for the Prevention of Pauperism, although the society closed that year. In 1823 he became a trustee of a Baltimore almshouse.

== Baltimore and Ohio Railroad ==
In 1825, Thomas became involved with the early canal enterprises in New England and acted as commissioner of the Chesapeake & Ohio Canal system in Maryland. He became disillusioned with the project after realizing that it would not benefit Baltimore and he resigned his commission in 1828.

Inspired by his brother Evan's description of an English mining railroad, Thomas, George Brown and 25 other civic leaders of Baltimore determined to build a railroad from Baltimore to the Ohio River and beyond. They obtained corporate charters from the Maryland and Virginia legislatures in 1827. With Thomas as president, George Brown as treasurer and Alexander Brown as one of several other investors, Thomas founded a railroad to compete with the canals. Construction of the B&O Railroad began in Baltimore in 1828, and the first passenger train to Ellicott's Mills (now Ellicott City) began service in 1830. The B&O was the first common carrier railroad in the United States. The B&O merged with the Chesapeake & Ohio Railway in 1987 to form CSX Transportation.

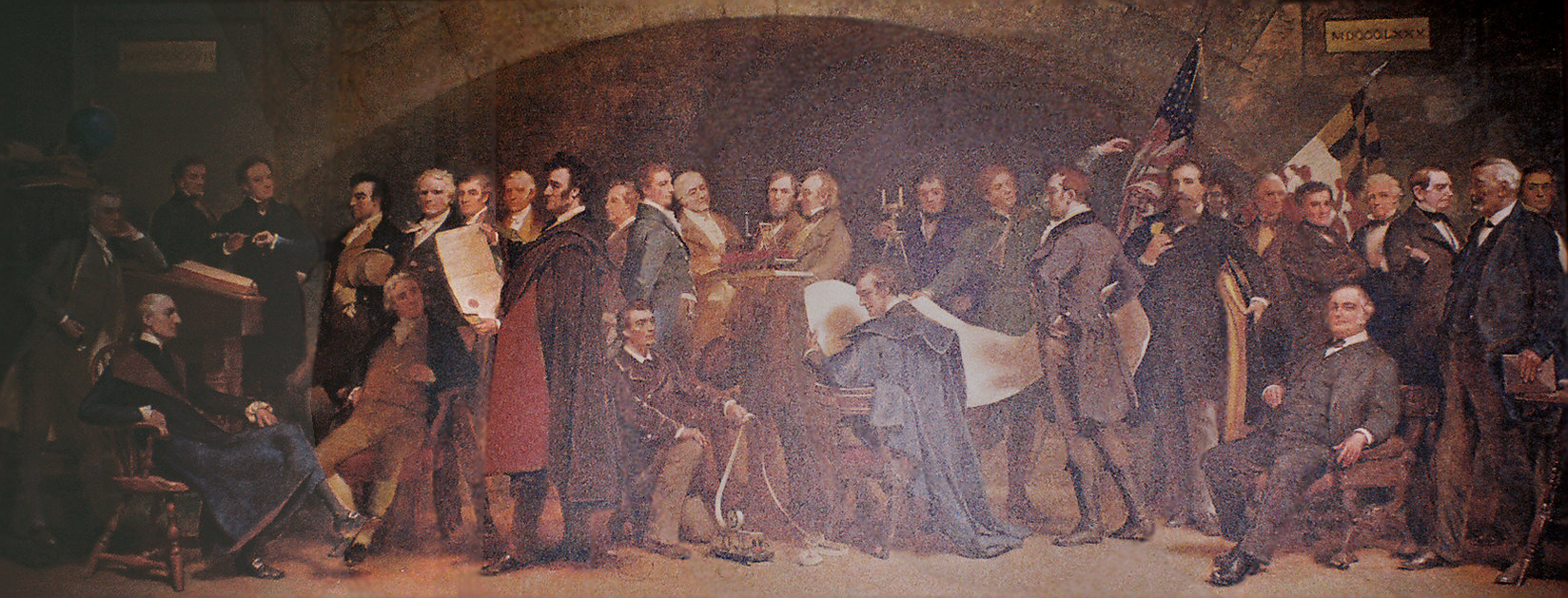
Francis Blackwell Mayer's The Founders of the Baltimore and Ohio Railroad (1891). Philip Thomas and George Brown are the first two figures pictured on the left.

In building the new railroad, Thomas and the B&O encountered many obstacles - political, legal, financial and technical - but construction of the main line continued westward during the 1830s. The line reached the Potomac River across from Harpers Ferry, Virginia (later West Virginia) in 1834. The B&O also completed a branch line from Baltimore to Washington, D.C. in 1835. By 1836, Thomas was in poor health, and he resigned from the B&O presidency on June 30, succeeded by Louis McLane.

== Personal life ==
He died in 1861 while living with his daughter in Yonkers, New York. He had seven children.

== See also ==
- List of railroad executives

== Notes ==
Business positions
New title	President of Baltimore and Ohio Railroad; 1827 – 1836	Succeeded by Louis McLane
