= Rectangular octave virginal =

Chordophone-zither-plucked-virginal

Rectangular Octave Virginal
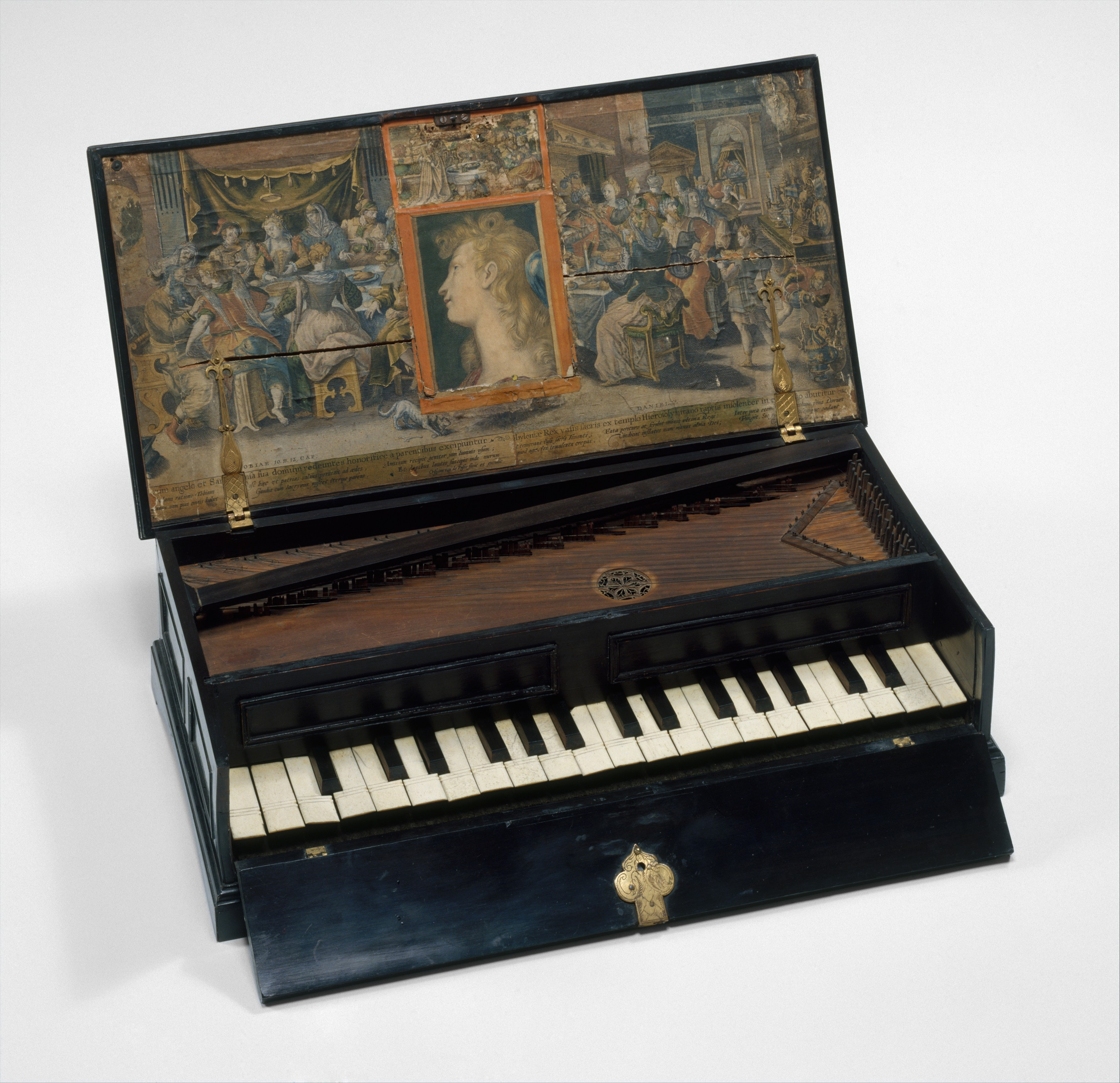
- Year: 16th century
- Location: Metropolitan Museum of Art
- Accession no.: 89.4.1778
- Identifiers: The Met object ID: 502325

Rectangular octave virginal is a 16th-century virginal in the style of Samuel Biedermann the Elder, probably made in Augsburg about 1600. It is in the collection of the Metropolitan Museum of Art.

== Early history and creation ==
Little is known of the early history of this specific instrument. It was donated by Mary Elizabeth Adams Brown and is part of the Crosby Brown Collection of Musical Instruments gifted in 1889, where it is classified as a Chordophone-Zither-plucked-virginal. It is decorated with hand-painted engravings by Hans Sebald Beham and Crispijn van de Passe I.

== Description and interpretation ==
The left engraving shows the return of Tobias, showing the scene where the angel Raphael from The Book of Tobit takes leave of old Tobit and Sarah before flying off into heaven (his flight can be seen through the window). Tobit seated next to his bride under the cloth of honor looks at the angel. The right engraving shows a scene from the Book of Daniel when a hand writes the prophecy on the wall during Belshazzar's feast (his murder can be seen in the background).

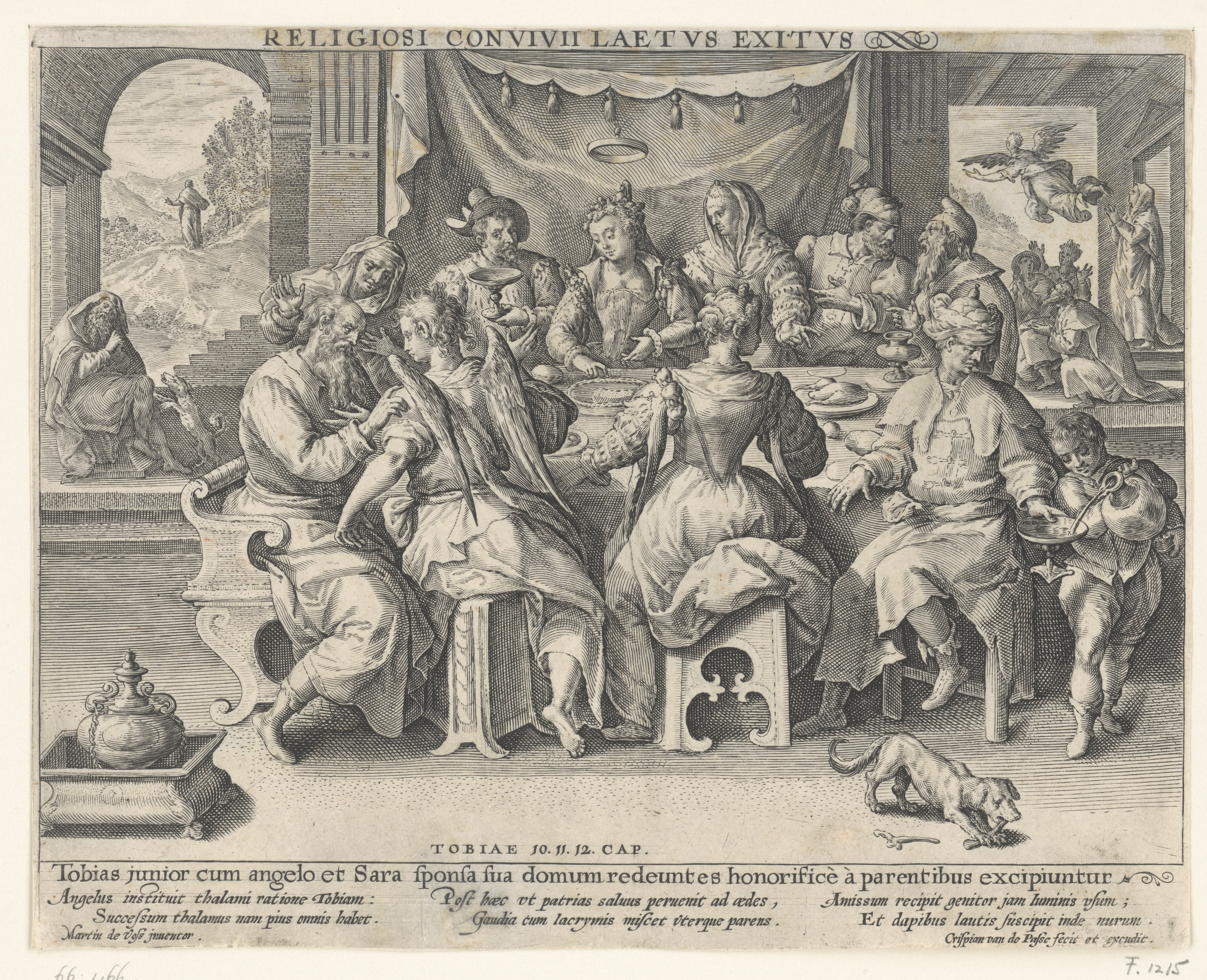
Tobias junior cum angelo et Sara sponsa sua domum redeuntes honorifice a parentibus, Van de Passe after Maerten de Vos (the engraving on the left)

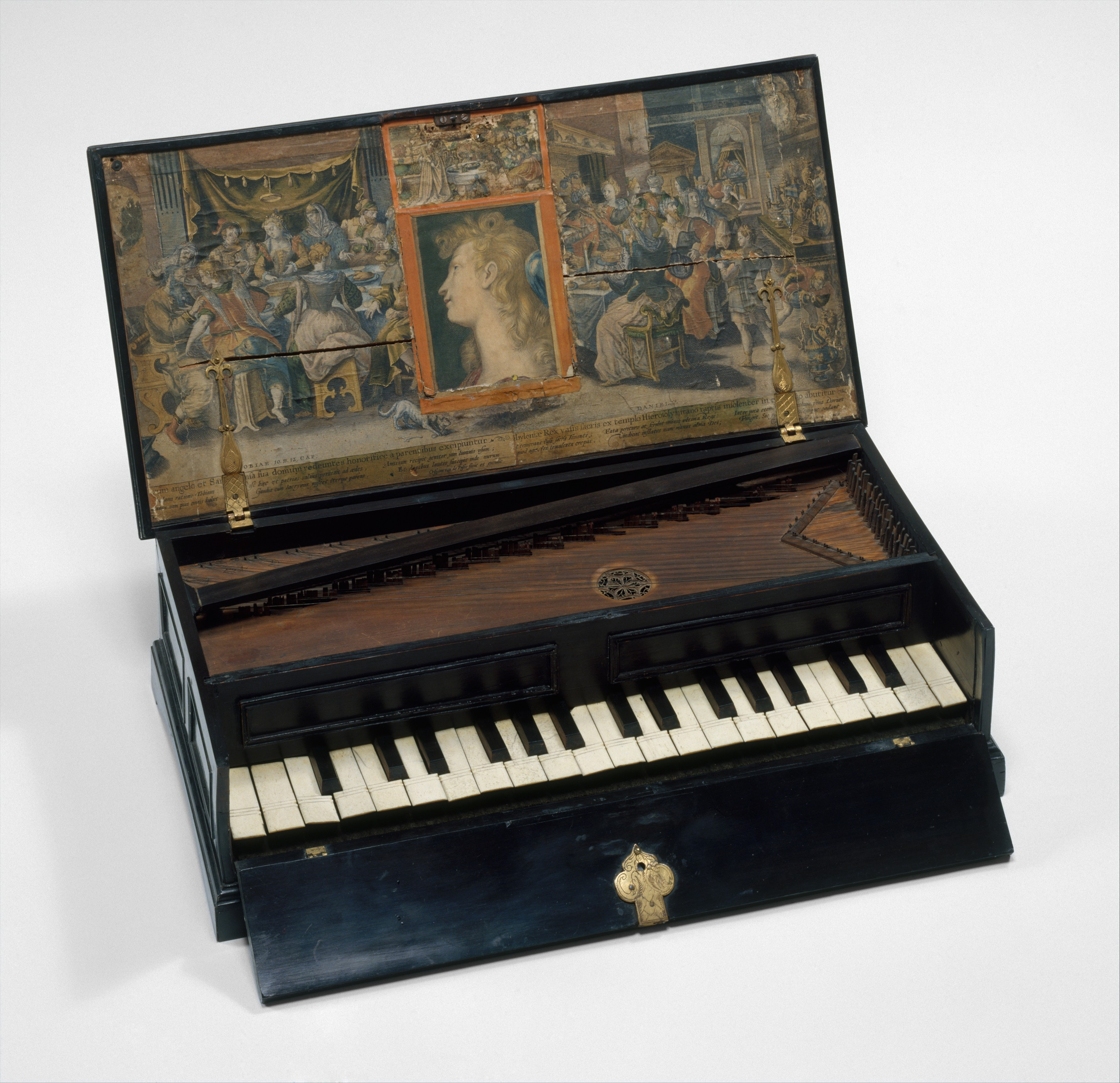

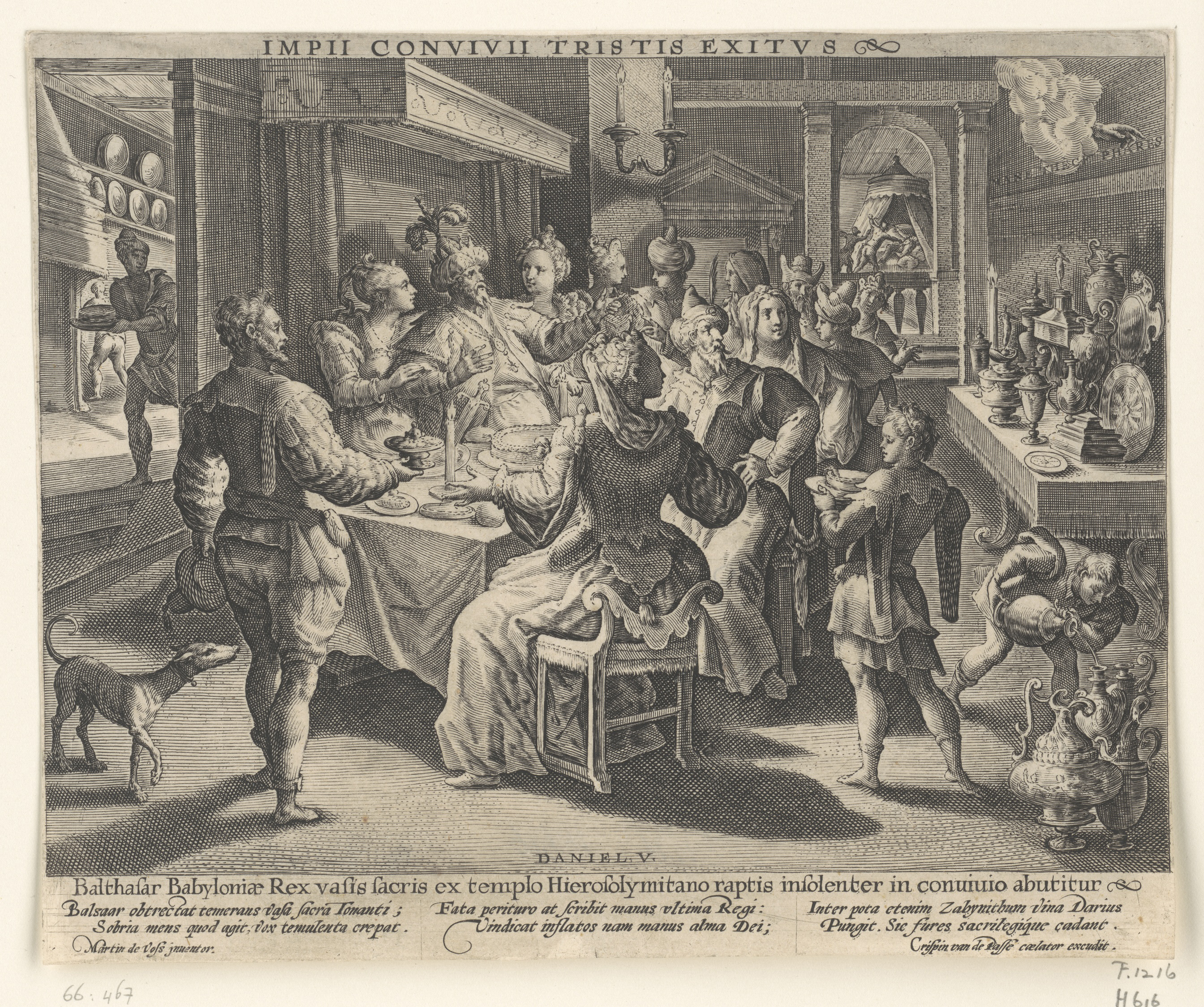
Belshazzar's feast, Van de Passe after Maerten de Vos (the engraving on the right)

== Later history and influence ==
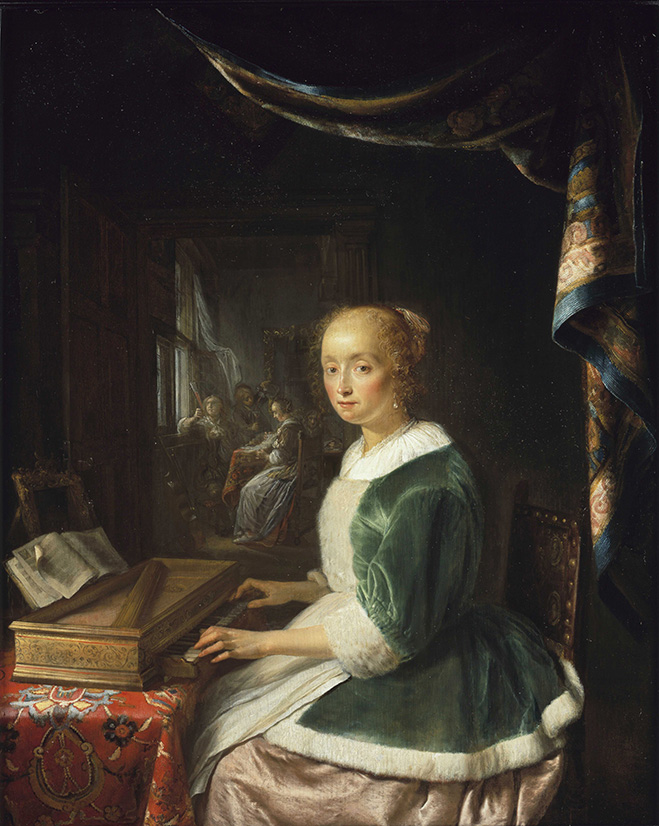
A Young Lady Playing a Clavichord, an impression of how such an instrument was still being used a half-century later

The presence of the engravings helps to both date the piece as well as give a glimpse into the popular scenes from the bible after the Protestant Reformation.

== See also ==
- Ottavini (singular form: Ottavino) — miniature virginals with octave higher pitch, produced by both Italian and northern schools.
- Double virginals — known as Mother and Child (moeder und kind), the instruments combined a normal virginal and ottavino, produced by Flemish school, in particular the Ruckers family.
