= Alexander Brown (banker) =

Irish merchant, American bank founder (1764–1834)

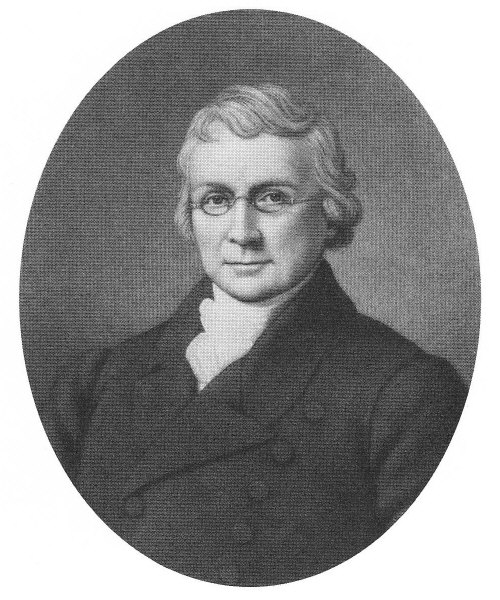
- Brown in an 1827 engraving by John Wesley Jarvis
- Born: 17 November 1764; Ballymena, County Antrim, Ireland
- Died: 4 April 1834 (aged 69); Baltimore, Maryland, USA
- Occupations: Merchant, banker
- Known for: Founder of Alexander Brown & Sons
- Spouse: Grace Davison (m. 1783)
- Children: 4+, including William and George
- Relatives: John Crosby Brown (grandson)

Alexander Brown (17 November 1764 – 4 April 1834), was an Irish merchant and banker. Beginning as a merchant trader, first of linen in Belfast, then of cotton and tobacco after migrating to Baltimore, Maryland, he later shifted his focus to financial services. He founded Alex. Brown & Sons, the oldest investment banking firm in the US, in 1800, and with his sons operated a network of banks in the US and England. He made his fortune from the transatlantic cotton trade, and was one of the first millionaires in the United States.

== Early life and emigration ==
Alexander Brown was born 17 November 1764 in Ballymena in County Antrim (now in Northern Ireland), one of four surviving children of William Brown and Margaret Brown (née Davison). As a young man, Brown achieved some success as a linen dealer and auctioneer in Belfast. In 1783 he married Grace Davison, possibly his cousin, from Drumnasole, County Antrim, and they had four surviving children, William (b. 30 May 1784), George (b. 17 April 1787), John (b. 21 May 1788), and James (b. 4 February 1791). These boys were sent to school with the Reverend J. Bradley in Yorkshire.

While there is no evidence that Brown was involved in the Irish Rebellion of 1798, he did go into hiding in its aftermath and, perhaps as a consequence of the resulting political and economic conditions in Ireland, he emigrated to the United States. Several years earlier Brown's brother-in-law, Dr George Brown, and his younger brother, Stewart, who had sold linen goods supplied by Alexander, had emigrated to Baltimore, Maryland. Thus it was to Baltimore, a growing port town of 26,514 people on the upper Chesapeake Bay, that Brown, his wife, and son William (the younger sons still in school in Yorkshire) sailed in 1800.

By 20 December Brown had established an address and his "Irish Linen Warehouse" and was able to publish in the Federal Gazette and Baltimore Daily Advertiser that he had for sale linen goods, three dozen mahogany chairs, and four clocks. This was the beginning of a thriving business for Alexander Brown & Company, importing general merchandise and Irish linens to Baltimore, the latter supplied by his cousin William Gihon and friends in Ulster, and exporting tobacco and cotton to Liverpool from the American south. In 1803 he brought his three younger sons to Baltimore, and by 1805 took William into partnership with him as Alexander Brown & Son; five years later George was included in the partnership to form Alexander Brown & Sons, the oldest such bank in the United States, which is currently partnered with Raymond James, a wealth management firm.

== Transatlantic businesses ==
Brown realised that Liverpool was the key to the transatlantic trade in which he was engaged, and in 1809 he sent William, who it was thought would also benefit from a less humid climate, to Liverpool to carry out shipping and merchandising arrangements for his father's interests. William founded a company in his own name in 1810, later changed to William & James Brown & Company, with his brother, and still later to Brown, Shipley & Company, with Joseph Shipley, an American who joined the firm in 1826 and who was instrumental in saving it during the Panic of 1837 by negotiating a £1,950,000 loan from the Bank of England. The Liverpool firm first functioned as an agent for Alexander Brown & Sons, purchasing linen and other goods and becoming a leading seller of cotton and tobacco.

Alexander Brown's initial business was based on trade in goods; he even acquired his own fleet of merchant ships. However, in the aftermath of the War of 1812, he realised that there was less risk and more money to be earned handling the finances of the transatlantic trade. As Brown began to provide financial services for other merchants, buying sterling bills from cotton and tobacco exporters in the American south and selling them to importers of British merchandise in Baltimore, the Liverpool operation became a vital link in the process of handling currency exchange and of providing credit for international commerce, that is, accepting (guaranteeing) bills of exchange, issuing letters of credit, and furnishing information on the financial reliability of firms engaged in the transatlantic trade. In 1863 offices were opened at Founders' Court, Lothbury, London and in 1888 the Liverpool operations were closed. Brown, Shipley continues in several British cities as part of Quintet Private Bank of Luxembourg.

Brown, with his experience in the linen trade, was poised to exploit the expanding cotton industry in the early nineteenth century. He appointed agents in the key southern cities of Petersburg, Charleston, Savannah, Huntsville, Mobile and New Orleans to facilitate the export of cotton. Baltimore had flourished during the years of the Napoleonic Wars; however, better port facilities and better access to inland markets made Philadelphia and New York increasingly thriving business centres for both imports and exports during the 1820s and 1830s. To take advantage of this evolving situation, the third son, John, was sent to Philadelphia in 1818 to found John A. Brown & Company (later Brown & Bowen); the youngest son, James, who had worked with William in Liverpool, went to New York in 1825 to found Brown Brothers & Company. James also opened a branch of Brown Brothers in Boston in 1844 and reorganised Brown & Bowen, of Philadelphia, into Brown Brothers in 1859. This bank, the oldest and largest private bank in the United States, still exists as Brown Brothers Harriman & Co. (the merger with the Harriman bank taking place in 1931), with offices in several cities in the United States and overseas. These family banks created a financial network with a reputation for prudence and integrity that dominated credit, currency exchange, and shipping arrangements for British–American trade during the nineteenth century, overtaking Baring Brothers & Co. as the leading Anglo-American merchant bankers and carrying on into the twenty-first century.

== Other ventures ==
Alexander Brown and his son George were founders of the Baltimore and Ohio Railroad in 1827, one of the earliest railroads in the United States, which was intended to keep Baltimore competitive with New York after the completion of the Erie Canal. Alexander Brown was also a shareholder in the Second Bank of the United States, and when that bank was closed in 1836 the Browns were able to take a leading role in foreign exchange in the United States.

== Children ==
George Brown (1787–1859) married (1818) Isabella McLanahan of Baltimore. He retired from the bank in 1839 to pursue private financial affairs and to support such philanthropic activities in Baltimore as the Peabody Institute; he died on 26 August 1859.

William Brown (1784–1864) married (1809) Sara Gihon of Ballymena, was active in public life in Liverpool in addition to his work with Brown, Shipley. He was elected alderman in 1831, stood for parliament in 1844 as an Anti-Corn Law League candidate, and was elected MP in 1846, where he advocated free trade and decimal currency. In 1856 he raised and equipped the 1st Lancashire Artillery Volunteers, in which he served as lieutenant-colonel. In 1860 he opened the Free Public Library and Derby Museum in Liverpool, toward which he had contributed £60,000, and for which he was rewarded with a baronetcy in 1863. William Brown died on 21 May 1864.

John Alexander Brown (1788–1872) married (1813) Isabella Patrick of Ballymena and, after she died, Grace Brown, the daughter of Dr George Brown of Baltimore. He retired in 1837 and devoted himself to Presbyterian Church activities in Philadelphia; he died on 31 December 1872.

James Brown (1791–1877) married (1817) Louisa Kirkland Benedict; after she died, he married (1831) Eliza Maria Coe. He remained active in the affairs of Brown Brothers & Company till his death on 1 November 1877, during which time the New York bank emerged as the headquarters of the several firms. James Brown was a trustee of the New York Life Insurance Company and the Bank for Savings; he took a particular interest in Union Theological Seminary, of which he was a director, and he was involved in numerous charities.

== Death ==
Brown died on April 4, 1834 in Baltimore. At the time of his death, he was one of the first millionaires in the United States.

== Content attribution ==
- This article incorporates text by Francis M. Carroll/Dictionary of Irish Biography available under the CC BY 4.0 license.
