= Alex. Brown & Sons =

First investment bank in the United States

Alex Brown & Sons
- Type: Corporation
- Industry: Investment services
- Founded: 1800; 226 years ago
- Founder: Alexander Brown
- Fate: Acquired
- Successor: Alex. Brown, a Division of Raymond James
- Headquarters: Baltimore, Maryland, U.S.
- Products: Financial services investment banking

Alex. Brown & Sons was the first investment bank in the United States, founded by Alexander Brown in 1800 in Baltimore, Maryland. The firm was acquired by Bankers Trust in 1997 to form BT Alex. Brown, and then integrated into Deutsche Bank in 1999 following Deutsche's acquisition of BT. In 2016, Raymond James acquired Deutsche's U.S. private client services unit, operating under the Alex. Brown brand.

== History ==
=== Founding and early history ===
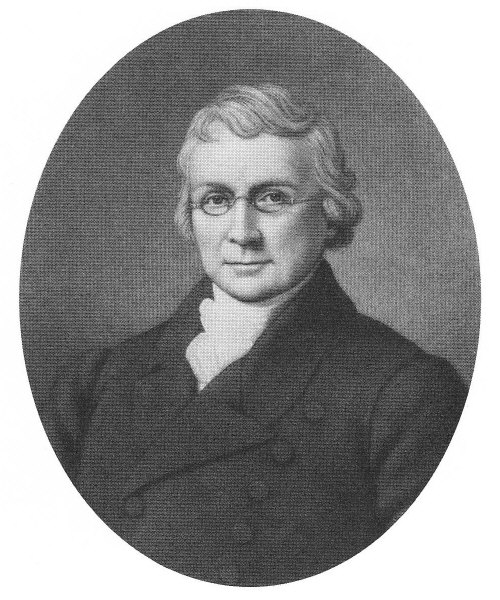
Alexander Brown

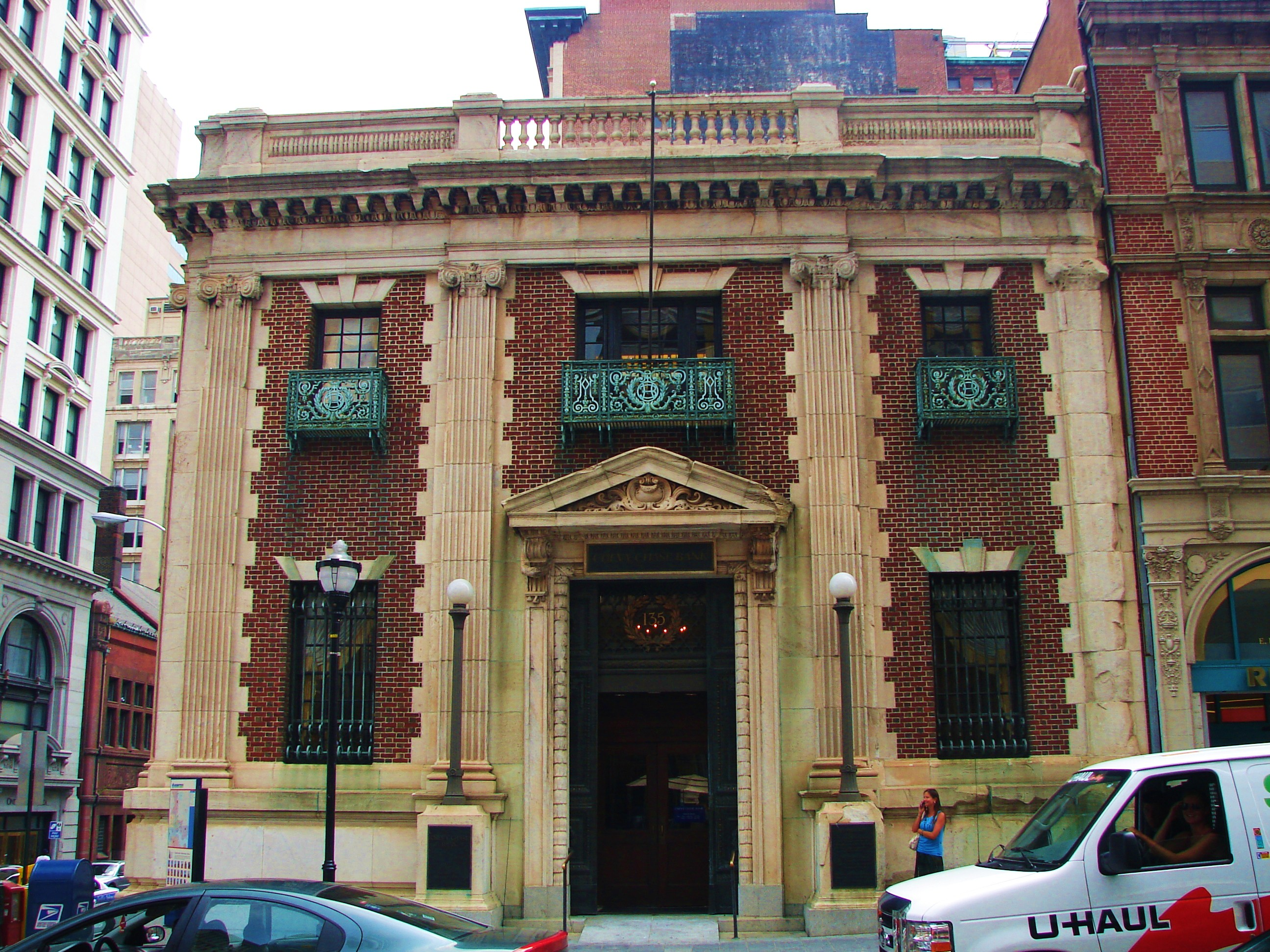
Alex. Brown & Sons Building in Baltimore

Alexander Brown (1764–1834), an Irish linen merchant, emigrated in 1800 from Broughshane, near Ballymena, in Ulster to the United States, settling in Baltimore, Maryland, where he established the first investment banking firm in the U.S. In 1808, the company organized the first initial public offering in the U.S., that of the Baltimore Water Company.

In 1810, Alexander Brown was joined in business by his sons, William, George, John, and James, and the firm was named Alex. Brown and Sons, Inc. By the 1820s, Alexander Brown had expanded his business interests into sterling exchange and international trade, including tobacco and cotton.

Brown's sons eventually started related businesses in various locations, beginning with William. William founded William Brown and Company in Liverpool, England, which later became Brown, Shipley & Co. In 1818, John and James started Brown Bros. & Co. in Philadelphia. James subsequently opened a branch in New York City in 1825, a predecessor to Brown Brothers Harriman & Co.

George remained at the firm's Baltimore headquarters, where he took a leading role in the founding of the Baltimore and Ohio Railroad in 1827. Upon Alexander Brown's death in 1834, George became the head of Alex. Brown and Sons, which proclaimed itself "America's foremost international banking enterprise in the nineteenth century."

Following the panic of 1837, Alex. Brown and Sons withdrew from most of its lending business and chose to focus on currency exchange, investment banking, and international trade.

Some historical records of Alex Brown & Sons are housed in the manuscript collections at New York Historical.

=== Acquisition and Integration ===
BT Alex. Brown logo in use between 1997 and 1999 following its acquisition by Bankers Trust

Alex. Brown & Sons, at the time the oldest privately held brokerage in the U.S., was acquired by Bankers Trust in 1997 for between $1.7 billion and $2.5 billion in stock to form BT Alex. Brown.

Less than two years later, in June 1999, Deutsche Bank bought Bankers Trust, along with Alex. Brown & Sons, for more than $10 billion. The Alex Brown name initially survived as Deutsche Banc Alex. Brown, the brokerage services division of Deutsche Bank Securities.

September 2016 marked a new chapter for Alex Brown Wealth Management when it was officially sold to Raymond James. The company provides a range of advisory, brokerage, research, and investment services to high-net-worth individual investors in the US. It performs research on more than 2,500 stocks, as well as corporate bonds and foreign securities.

=== Noted alumni ===
Alex. Brown's chairman in 1998 was A. B. "Buzzy" Krongard, who was appointed Executive Director of the Central Intelligence Agency (CIA) in 2001.

== See also ==
- Alex. Brown & Sons Building
- Brown Advisory
- Brown, Shipley & Co.
- Brown Brothers & Co.
- Brown Memorial Presbyterian Church
- Bankers Trust
- Deutsche Bank
- Raymond James
