= Winthrop G. Brown =

American lawyer and diplomat

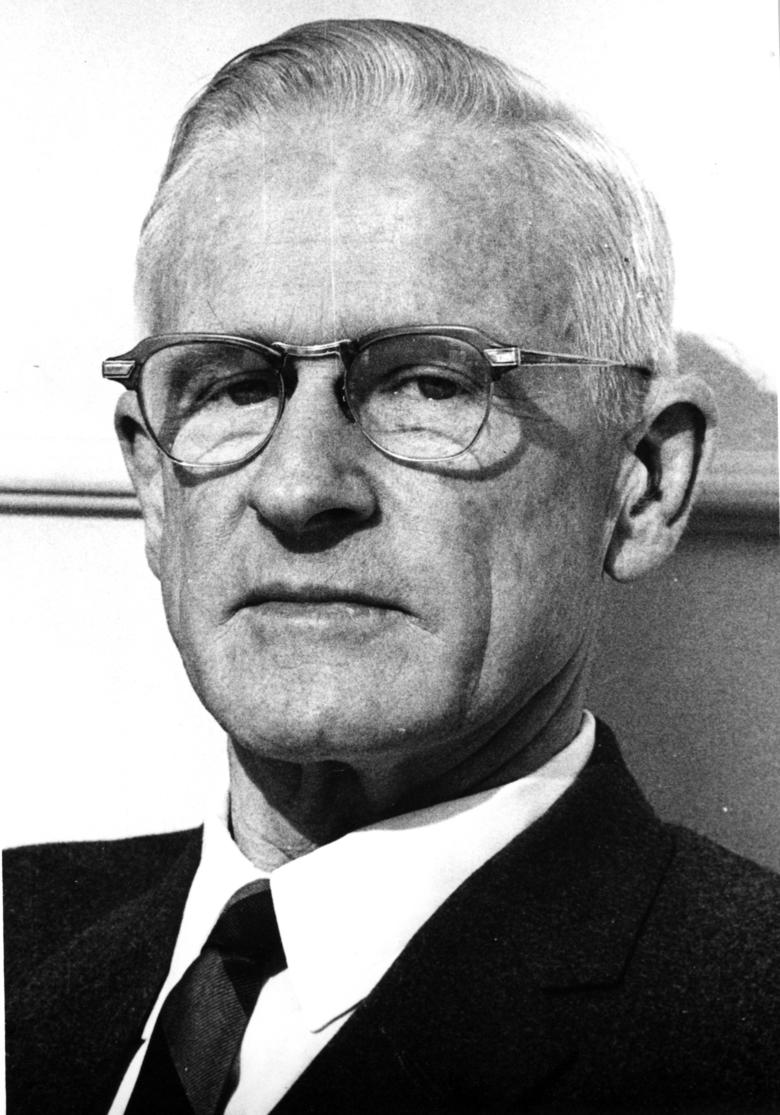

7th United States Ambassador to Korea
- In office August 14, 1964 – June 10, 1967
- President: Lyndon Johnson
- Preceded by: Samuel D. Berger
- Succeeded by: William J. Porter

5th United States Ambassador to Laos
- In office July 25, 1960 – June 28, 1962
- President: Dwight D. Eisenhower; John F. Kennedy
- Preceded by: Horace H. Smith
- Succeeded by: Leonard S. Unger

Personal details
- Born: July 2, 1907 Seal Harbor, Maine
- Died: May 25, 1987 (aged 79) Washington, D.C.
- Spouse: Peggy Bell Brown
- Children: 3
- Parent: William Adams Brown (father)
- Relatives: Descendants of Robert Coe
- Education: Yale University (BA, LL.B.)
- Profession: Diplomat
- Awards: President's Award for Distinguished Federal Civilian Service (1963)

Winthrop Gilman Brown (July 12, 1907 — May 25, 1987) was an American lawyer and diplomat. He served in posts in Asia, including as United States Ambassador to South Korea from 1964 to 1967.

== Biography ==
Winthop G. Brown was born in Seal Harbor, Maine, on July 12, 1907, and was a son of Rev. William Adams Brown and Helen Gilman Noyes Brown. He earned his Bachelor of Arts degree at Yale University in 1927 and earned his Bachelor of Laws degree from Yale Law School. After graduating from Yale, he established a law practice in New York City, but later became a career diplomat, and the United States Ambassador to Laos from 1960 to 1962. From 1964 to 1967, he was the United States Ambassador to South Korea, during which he was heavily involved in negotiations with the South Korean government under Park Chung Hee to ensure Korean troops would send troops to the Vietnam War. His last post as diplomat was the Deputy Assistant Secretary for East Asian and Pacific Affairs, serving from 1968 to 1972. He died on May 25, 1987, in Washington D.C.

Diplomatic posts
Preceded by Samuel D. Berger	United States Ambassador to South Korea; August 14, 1964 – June 10, 1967	Succeeded by William J. Porter
Preceded by Horace H. Smith	United States Ambassador to Laos; July 25, 1960 – June 28, 1962	Succeeded by Leonard S. Unger
