= Alex. Brown & Sons Building =

Historic building in Baltimore, Maryland, US

- U.S. National Register of Historic Places
- Baltimore City Landmark
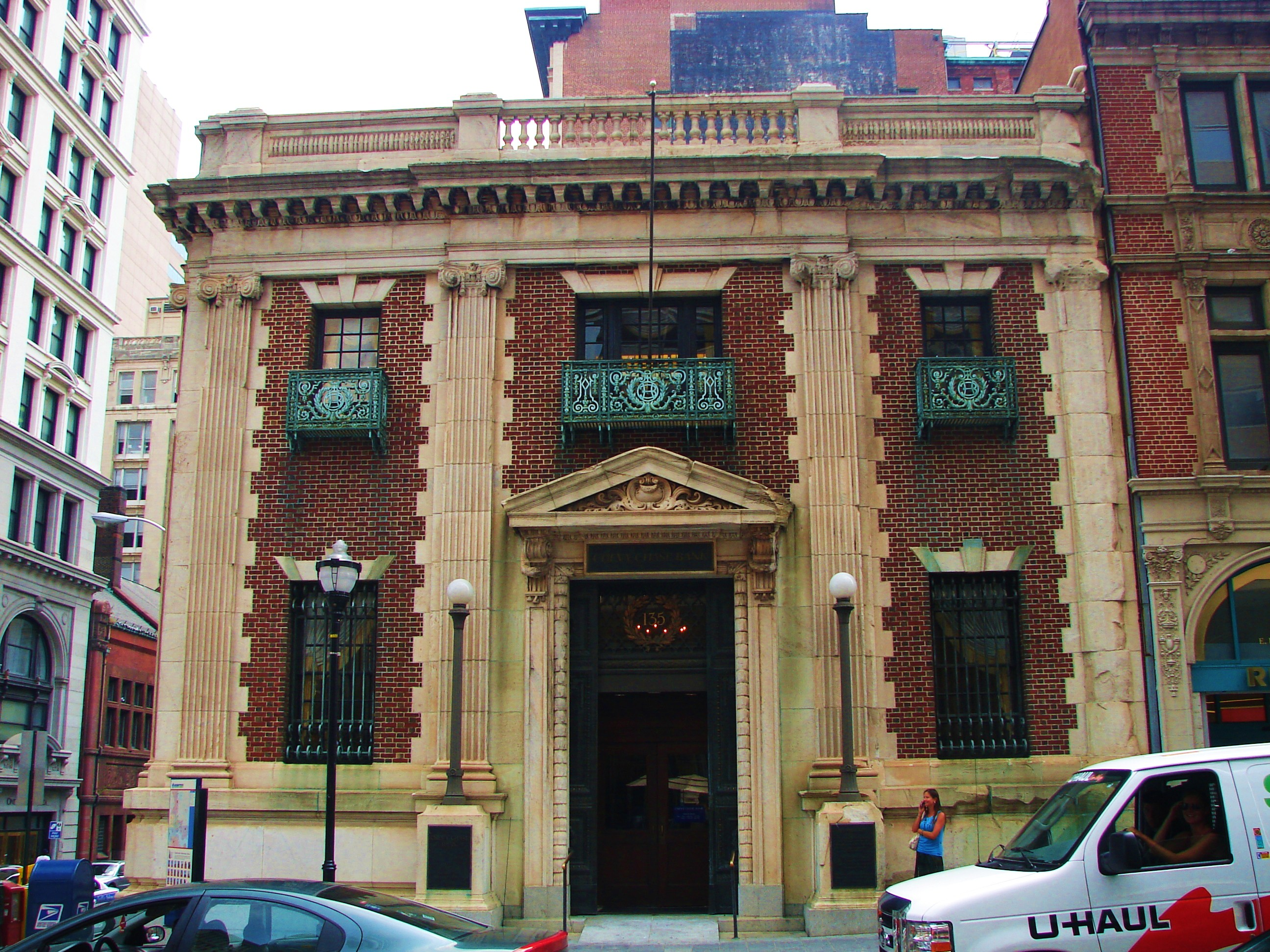
- Alex. Brown building on Baltimore Street in Baltimore, Maryland
- Interactive map of Alex. Brown & Sons Building
- Location: 135 East Baltimore St., Baltimore, Maryland
- Coordinates: 39°17′22″N 76°36′45″W
- Area: 0.1 acres (0.040 ha)
- Built: 1901
- Architect: Parker & Thomas; George A. Fuller & Co.
- Architectural style: Georgian Revival
- NRHP reference No.: 82001581

Significant dates
- Added to NRHP: December 2, 1982
- Designated BCL: 1975

The Alex. Brown & Sons building is a historic structure located at 135 East Baltimore Street in Baltimore, Maryland. During the 20th century it served as the corporate headquarters for the banking firm Alex. Brown & Sons, the oldest in the United States when it was purchased by Bankers Trust in 1997. The two-story building, completed in 1901 and designed by the partnership of J. Harleston Parker and Douglas H. Thomas. Jr., survived the 1904 Baltimore fire. The building was modified on the Calvert Street side and in the interior by the firm Beecher, Friz, and Gregg in 1905.

The building was sold to Chevy Chase Bank in 1997. A plaque on the side of the building states:

A thorough historical renovation of the building was completed in 1996 when it was reopened as a traditional retail bank branch. The beautiful stained glass dome, probably the work of Baltimore artist Gustave Baumstark (who studied under both Louis C. Tiffany and John LaFarge) was cleaned and refurbished. The marble columns and the plaster moldings of the great banking hall were restored to their original designs. During the renovation the original teller line was reconstructed. Even such details as the design and placement of the freestanding furniture now in existence in the bank branch were designed to mimic the original furniture.

The Alex. Brown & Sons Building was listed on the National Register of Historic Places in 1982.

It was reported in May 2021 that the building had been leased for the set of the Disney-FX film pilot The Spook Who Sat by the Door, based on the novel of the same name.
