= John Crosby Brown =

American businessman

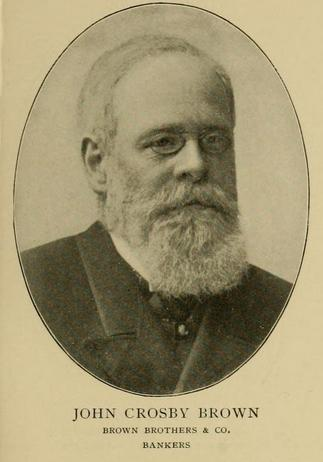
- Born: May 22, 1838; New York City, New York, U.S.
- Died: June 25, 1909 (aged 71); Orange Mountain House, New Jersey, U.S.
- Education: Columbia University
- Spouse: Mary Elizabeth Adams (m. 1864)
- Children: 6
- Parent(s): James Brown; Eliza Maria Coe Brown
- Relatives: George Brown (uncle); Sir William Brown (uncle); Descendants of Robert Coe

John Crosby Brown (May 22, 1838 – June 25, 1909) was a senior partner in the investment bank Brown Bros. & Co., founded by his family.

== Early life and education ==
Brown was born on May 22, 1838, in New York City. He was the son of banker James Brown (1791–1877) and Eliza Maria (née Coe) Brown (1803–1890). His father was a banker and supporter of Union Theological Seminary and his paternal grandfather was Alexander Brown of Baltimore. Among his extended family were uncles George Brown and Sir William Brown, 1st Baronet.

Brown was educated privately and then entered Columbia University, where he graduated in 1859.

== Career ==
Brown worked at Brown Bros. & Co., an investment bank founded by his father and uncles. Eventually, he became the senior partner of Brown Bros. In 1931, Brown Bros. merged with Harriman Brothers & Company to become Brown Brothers Harriman & Co., one of the oldest and largest partnership banks in the United States.

Brown served on the board of education of New York City, and was a trustee of Columbia University.

== Personal life ==
On November 9, 1864, Brown was married to Mary Elizabeth Adams in New York City. Mary was the daughter of John Adams. Together, they were the parents of six children:

- William Adams Brown (1865–1943), who married Helen Gilman Noyes (1867–1942). William went to St. Paul's School in Concord, New Hampshire. He received from Yale University an A.B. degree in 1886, an A.M. degree in 1888 and a Ph.D. in 1901. He graduated from Union Theological Seminary in 1890 and was ordained in the Presbyterian Church in 1893. He also studied at the University of Berlin from 1890 to 1892. He was a member of the Yale Corporation from 1917 to 1934, and was acting president of Yale University from 1919 to 1920.
- Eliza Coe Adams (1868–1959)
- Mary Magoun Brown (1869–1962)
- James Crosby Brown (1872–1930), who married Mary Agnes Hewlett (1875–1919) in 1898. After her death, he married Aurelia Gladys Pomeroy (1883–1937) in 1923.
- Thatcher Magoun Brown (1876–1954), who married Caro Lord Noyes (1876–1947), the sister of his elder brother's wife.
- Amy Brighthurst Brown (1878–1960)

He died on June 25, 1909, in Orange Mountain House, New Jersey, and was buried at Green-Wood Cemetery in Brooklyn.

Some records of John Crosby Brown are included in the Brown Brothers Harriman Collection, which is housed in New-York Historical Society's manuscript collection.

== Sources ==
- West Orange History: John Crosby Brown
- Bulletin of the Metropolitan Museum of Art: John Crosby Brown, Treasurer
