= Brown Shipley =

Bank in London, England, founded 1810

- Type: Bank
- Industry: Financial services
- Founded: 1810; 216 years ago
- Founder: Alexander Brown
- Headquarters: London, England
- Products: Investment management, financial planning, lending
- Total assets: 984,660,000,000 pound sterling (2025)
- Parent: Quintet Private Bank
- Website: www.brownshipley.com

Brown Shipley is a member of Quintet Private Bank. It is headquartered in London's Moorgate, behind the Bank of England. Brown Shipley offers wealth planning, investment management and lending services for private, corporate and institutional clients. Effective January 2025, the CEO is Robert Kitchen.

== History ==
In 1800, Irish merchant Alexander Brown, founder of Alex Brown & Sons went into business in Baltimore, Maryland, importing Irish linen and exporting cotton and tobacco back to Britain. In 1810, his eldest son William brought the family business to Liverpool under the name William Brown & Co.

In 1812 William returned to Baltimore to introduce his new wife and baby to his family and to report on trading and political conditions in Liverpool and Europe.

In 1825, William formed a partnership with Joseph Shipley. The new trading firm financed merchants who were shipping goods between Britain, the United States and other parts of Europe and the Americas. Over the years, the trading activities ceased and the merchant banking activities grew, based in London.

In 1918 the partnership between Brown, Shipley and its American partners Brown Bros. & Co. ended, although each continued to act as agents for the other for some time. In 1946, Brown Shipley became a limited company.

Some historical records of Brown, Shipley & Co. are included in the Brown Brothers Harriman Collection housed in the manuscript collections at New-York Historical Society.

Between 1950 and 1989 the company had a prominent role in the London money market and developed an Investment Advisory Service, which provided an outlet for the company's heritage and expertise in evaluating business deals and the people behind them.

In 1992 Brown Shipley & Co. Ltd was acquired by European bank Quintet and joined its group of Private Bankers. At the turn of the millennium, Brown Shipley subsequently made its own acquisitions of stockbroker Cawood Smithie, private-client investment manager Henry Cooke and in 2001, pensions and investment manager Fairmount Group plc.

After celebrating its bicentenary in 2010, Brown Shipley expanded to new premises in Manchester, Edinburgh and Birmingham, complementing its newly refurbished London building.

Three further acquisitions served to broaden and strengthen Brown Shipley's offering: Hampton Dean, a chartered independent firm of financial planners giving the bank a Nottingham base in 2015; The Roberts Partnership, a financial planning and wealth management firm based in Manchester joined in 2016, adding £540m assets under management (AUM) and bringing the wealth manager's total AUM to £5.5bn; while 2017 saw Brown Shipley acquire the UK branch of Insinger de Beaufort.

In April 2018, Alan Mathewson joined Brown Shipley as the firm's CEO. Mathewson joined from Santander UK where he had worked for 22 years, most recently as managing director of wealth management and private banking. In January 2022, the company appointed Calum Brewster, previously the head of private banking, as its new CEO. In January 2025, the company appointed Robert Kitchen, previously COO, as its new CEO.

In June 2019 Brown Shipley acquired NW Brown & Co Limited, a wealth manager based in Cambridge with an additional office in Norwich. The addition of NW Brown increases Brown Shipley's total AUM to almost £9bn.

In 2019, Brown Shipley appointed Rory Tapner as chair to its board, replacing David Rough. In June 2021, the company appointed Kath Cates as the new chair of the board of directors. The board's non-executive directors are Marcia Cantor-Grable and Tim Gillbanks. Quintet Private Bank is the parent company of Brown Shipley.
