= Brown Brothers Harriman & Co. =

American private investment bank

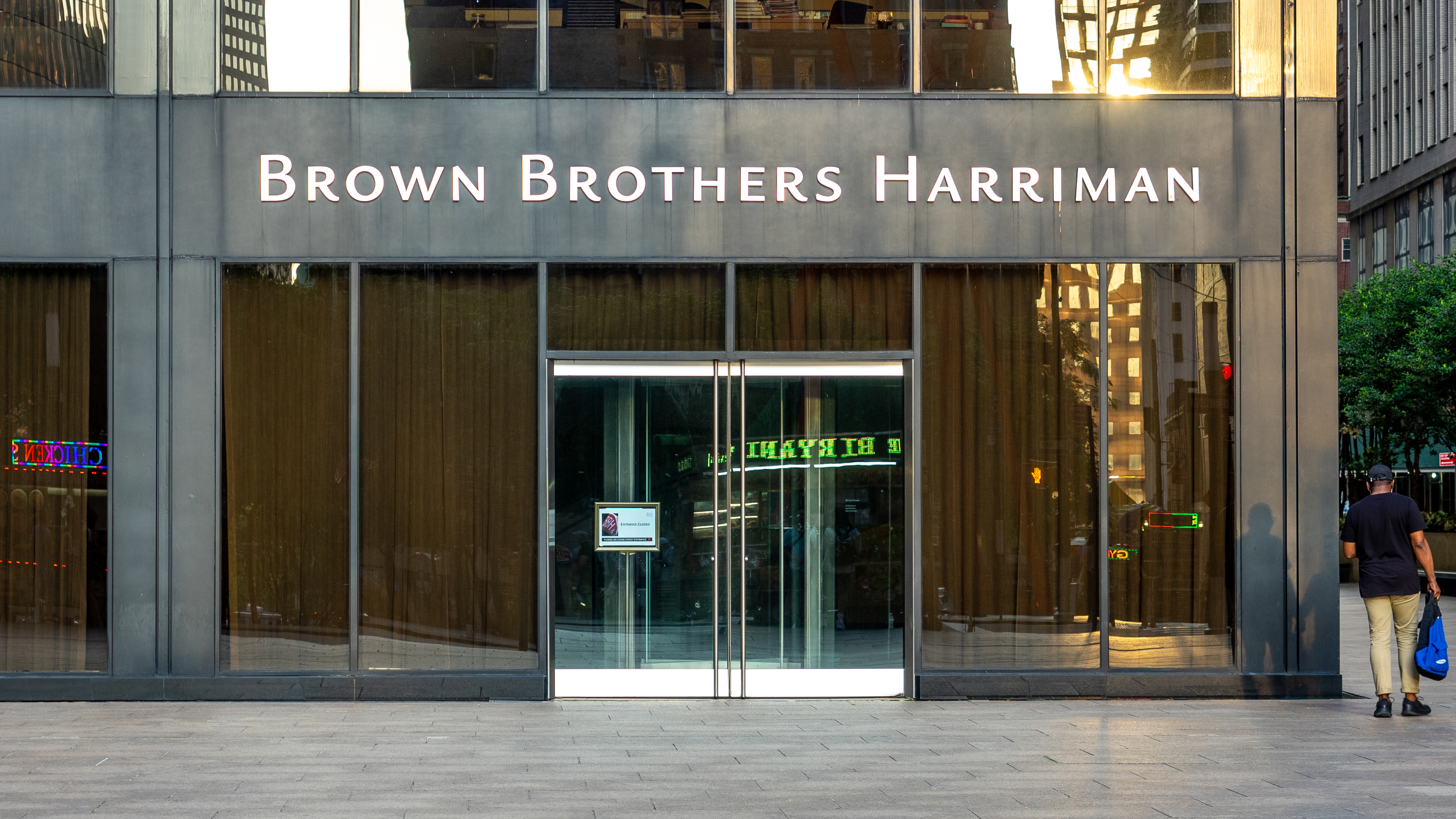
- Entrance at 140 Broadway
- Type: Partnership
- Industry: Financial Services
- Founded: January 1, 1931; 95 years ago (merger of Brown Bros. & Co. (1818), Harriman Brothers & Company (1927) and W. A. Harriman & Co. (1922))
- Headquarters: 140 Broadway; New York City, U.S.
- Number of employees: 6,000 (2026)
- Divisions: Capital Partners; Investor Services
- Website: www.bbh.com

Brown Brothers Harriman & Co. (BBH) is an American financial services firm and one of the oldest and one of the largest private investment banks in the United States. The group operates as a private partnership. In 1931, the merger of Brown Brothers & Co. (founded in 1818) and Harriman Brothers & Co. formed the current BBH.

Brown Brothers Harriman is also notable for the number of influential American politicians, government appointees, and Cabinet members who have worked at the company, such as W. Averell Harriman, Prescott Bush, Robert A. Lovett, Richard W. Fisher, Robert Roosa, Alan Greenspan, and Scott Bessent. Books on the firm have noted these alumni and the firm's role in shaping American capitalism and policy through a consistent presence on Wall Street for over 200 years.

As of 2026, the firm maintains 18 offices worldwide, including in New York City, Beijing, Boston, Chicago, Dublin, Grand Cayman, Hong Kong, Kraków, London, Luxembourg, Tokyo, and Zürich.

== Overview ==
Brown Brothers Harriman provides financial services through two main business lines.

=== Investor Services ===
Investor services include global custody, foreign exchange, and other fund services for asset managers and financial institutions. BBH has a data-connection system called Infomediary that integrates the different systems needed to trade, price and report data, similar to BlackRock's Aladdin.

In 2023, the firm managed nearly 25% of all new ETF launches in the US. As of 2024, the group's primary client services include support for ETF launches, alternative asset servicing and data management.

=== Capital Partners ===
BBH Capital Partners includes the firm's multi-family office, corporate advisory and banking, private equity and alternatives, and investment management groups, serving privately held businesses, wealthy individuals and families, and institutional investors.

The firm has been recognized in industry rankings, including Barron's Top 40 wealth management firms.

In 2015, BBH Capital Partners started "Women & Wealth" to publish financial topics conducted for women, including entrepreneurship and financial planning.

== History ==
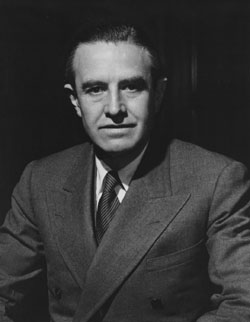
W. Averell Harriman, founding partner of Brown Brothers Harriman & Co.

=== Founding, 1800s ===
After immigrating to Baltimore in 1800 and building a successful linen trading business, Alexander Brown and his four sons co-founded Alex. Brown & Sons. In 1818, one son, John Alexander Brown, traveled to Philadelphia to establish John A. Brown and Co. In 1825, another son, James Brown, established Brown Bros. & Co. on Pine Street in Lower Manhattan and relocated to Wall Street in 1833. This firm eventually acquired all other Brown branches in the U.S.

Following the panic of 1837, Brown Brothers withdrew from most of its lending business. Two of the brothers, John and George, sold their shares in the company to the other two brothers, William and James. During the recovery from this economic turmoil, they chose to focus solely on currency exchange and international trade.

Another son, William Brown, had established William Brown & Co. in England in 1810, which was renamed Brown, Shipley & Co. in 1839 and became a separate entity in 1918.

=== Merger, 1900s ===
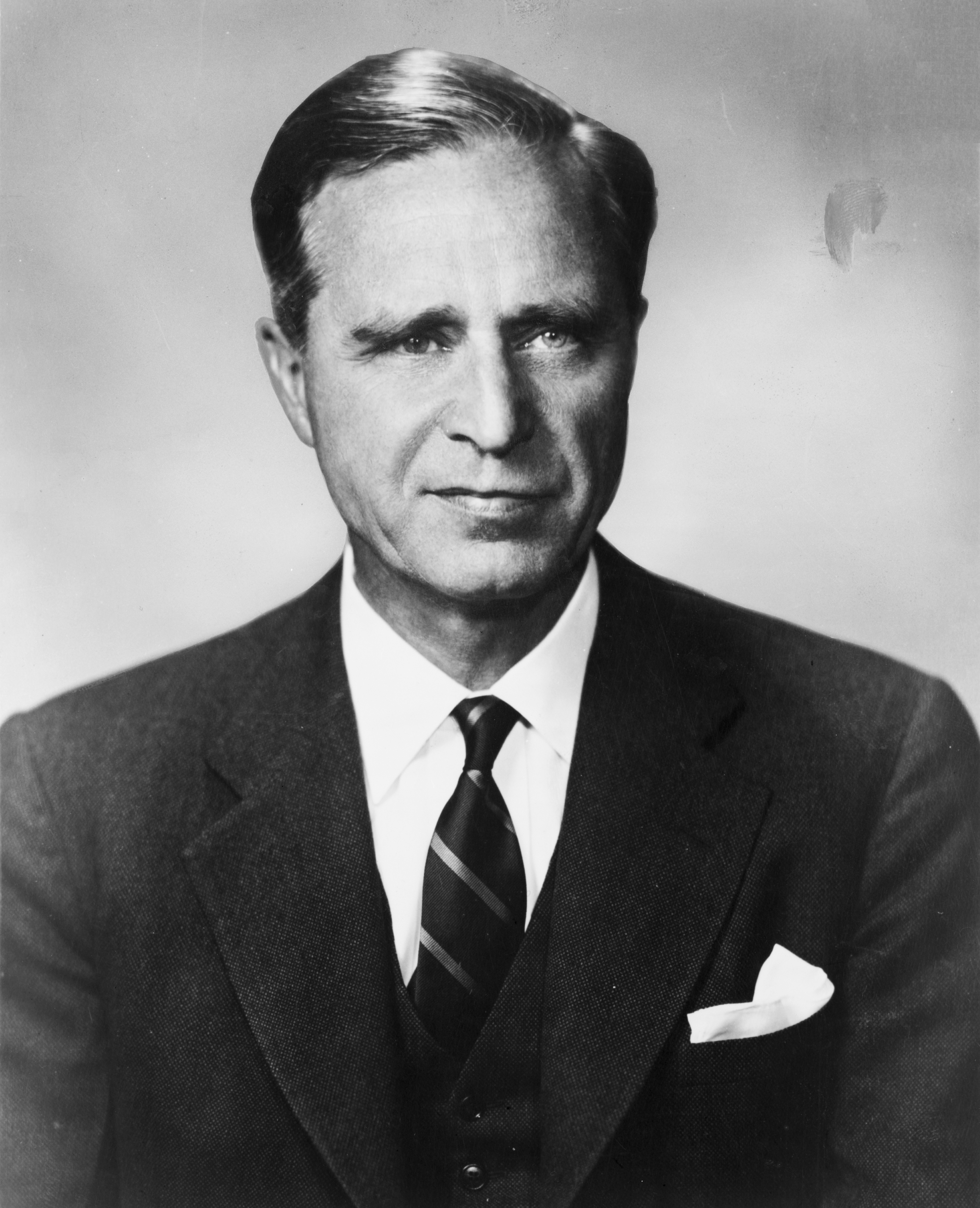
Prescott Bush, an initial minority owner after the merger between Brown Brothers and Harriman Brothers

On January 2, 1931, Brown Brothers & Co. merged with two other business entities, Harriman Brothers & Company, a private bank started with railway money, and W. A. Harriman & Co. to form Brown Brothers Harriman & Co. Founding partners included: Prescott Bush, E. Roland Harriman, W. Averell Harriman, Robert A. Lovett, and Knight Woolley.

Time's December 22, 1930, issue announced that the three-way merger featured 12 Yale graduates among 17 founding partners, of which eight had been Yale Skull and Bones members.

After the passage of the Glass-Steagall Act in 1932, the partners decided to focus on commercial banking, become a private bank, and spin its securities marketing and underwriting off into Harriman, Ripley and Company, which eventually evolved into Drexel Burnham Lambert via mergers.

W. Averell Harriman, the founding partner in the firm, left the leadership to his younger brother, E. Roland Harriman, and became a diplomat in World War I and World War II. W. Averell Harriman was the ambassador and statesman responsible for the relationship between Winston Churchill and Franklin Roosevelt during World War II. Some historical records of Brown Brothers Harriman and its precursor companies are housed in the manuscript collections at the New-York Historical Society.

=== Present, 2000s ===
In the last four decades, the firm remained a private partnership while many competitors went public. The firm avoided large-scale mergers and did not require government support during the 2008 financial crisis. As of 2021, annual revenue has been reported at approximately $2 billion, with profits of about $500 million.

In February 2021, the firm released the BBH Investment Operations, powered by the Infomediary technology platform, and reported around 150 users. Investors use the system to manage their data and operations.

In May 2021, Zachary Karabell released a book about the history of the firm, called Inside Money: Brown Brothers Harriman and the American Way of Power. The book describes the firm as responsible and influential throughout its 200-year history. The firm's partners have been well-connected throughout American government but have also been self-invested alongside their client's interests, which is credited for long-term success.

In 2026 BBH Infomediary Data Solutions released NAVqc, a system to help companies manage net asset value oversight obligations.

== See also ==
- Alex. Brown & Sons Building
- Bankers Trust
- Brown Memorial Presbyterian Church
