= Brown Bros. & Co. =

Investment bank

- Type: Partnership
- Industry: Investment Banking Commercial Banking
- Founded: 1818; 208 years ago
- Founder: George and John Brown
- Defunct: 1931
- Fate: Merge
- Successor: Brown Brothers Harriman & Co.
- Headquarters: Philadelphia, Pennsylvania, United States
- Owner: John Crosby Brown

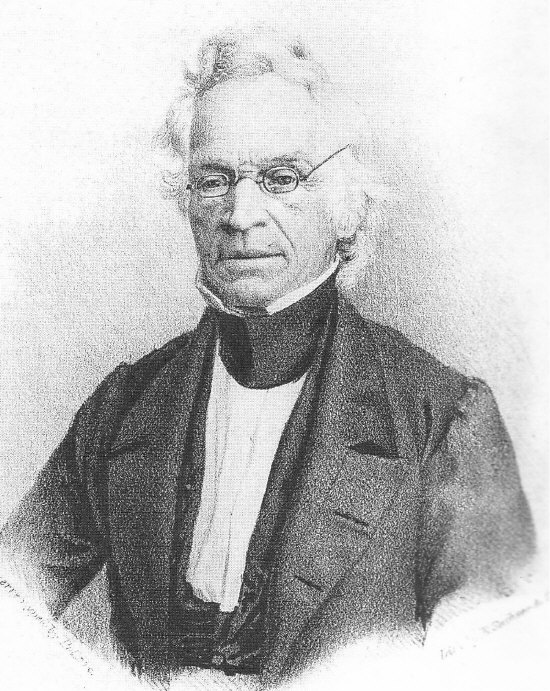
George Brown, co-founder of Brown Bros. & Co.

Brown Bros. & Co. was an investment bank from 1818 until its merger with Harriman Brothers & Company in 1931, to form Brown Brothers Harriman & Co. According to Zachary Karabell:

In its first hundred years, the firm helped to make paper currency standard in the U.S., underwrote the earliest railroad and trans-Atlantic steamship companies and almost unilaterally created the first foreign exchange system between the American dollar and the British pound. In the 20th century, it became a cornerstone of what came to be known as “the Establishment,” as its partners entered the halls of government to shape the global economic and security system that remains the world’s institutional architecture.

== History ==
Brown Brothers, an investment bank and trading company, was founded in 1818 in Philadelphia, Pennsylvania, by George Brown and John Brown, sons of former Ulster linen trader Alexander Brown (1764–1834) who had established a firm in Baltimore, Maryland. In 1825, the third son, James Brown (1791–1877), opened an affiliate in New York City under the name Brown Brothers and another in Boston, Massachusetts, in 1845. These firms were later merged under the name. James Brown's son, John Crosby Brown (1838–1909), would be a driving force for growth, making Wall Street in New York the center for operations and seeing the bank become major lenders to the textile, commodities, and transportation industries.

In 1931, the firm merged with Harriman Brothers & Company, another Wall Street firm owned by W. Averell Harriman and E. Roland Harriman, to form Brown Brothers Harriman & Co.

In 1964, John A. Kouwenhoven, professor of English at Barnard College and the author of The Columbia Historical Portrait of New York, among other works, was hired by Brown Brothers Harriman to identify and amass records of historical value to the firm. His title was Director of the Historical Files, which were to serve, among other purposes, as the research materials for the writing of Partners in Banking, commissioned by the publishers Doubleday & Co. to celebrate the firm's 150th anniversary in 1968. These files are held at the New-York Historical Society. The business records of Brown Brothers & Co. in New York City, including 176 volumes dated 1826–1880, were deposited at the New York Public Library and are almost entirely from the business career of James Brown.

== See also ==
- Alex. Brown & Sons
- Brown Brothers Harriman & Co.
- Brown, Shipley & Co.
