= Insinger Gilissen =

Anglo-Dutch bank

- Company type: Subsidiary
- Industry: Private Banking
- Founded: 1779; 247 years ago
- Founder: Herman Albrecht Insinger (1757-1805)
- Headquarters: Amsterdam, Netherlands
- Products: Asset management; Securities; Shoe Box (administrative service); Family Office; Charity Office
- Number of employees: 230 (2017)
- Parent: Quintet Private Bank
- Website: www.insingergilissen.nl

Insinger Gilissen, previously known as Insinger de Beaufort, is an Anglo-Dutch private bank providing private banking, wealth management and private planning to high-net-worth individuals and some institutional clients. In 2016 it merged with Theodoor Gilissen Bankiers to become Insinger Gilissen. Since 1 January 2017 Insinger Gilissen has been part of Quintet Private Bank.

== History ==
The roots of the bank go back to the 18th century, when the founder of the bank German Herman Albrecht Insinger (1757–1805) came to Amsterdam aged 11 years old. In 1779 together with merchant Paulus Prins he established the company Insinger en Prins. He left for the Caribbean as agent for a family that had provided mortgage loans to slavery plantations. He came back to Amsterdam in 1782 and Insinger & Co, as it had then been renamed, continued to concentrate on business in the West Indies and the lending to plantations.

For nearly two hundred years the bank was associated with the Insinger family, with family members leading the firm. By the 1950s in addition to conducting general trade, the company turns to banking activities, broking, participation in other companies, syndicates and consortia, managing assets for third parties and managing public limited companies.

It was only in 1972 it was decided to convert the company to a naamloze vennootschap. The company established as Insinger Bankiers N.V. and merged with the English Cannon Street Investments. In 1976 the company merged with commission broker Willems & Cie, to become Bank Insinger Willems N.V. In 1988 Bank Insinger Willems N.V. merges with Amsterdam commission broker De Beaufort en Kraaijenhagen and continues under the name bank Insinger de Beaufort.

In 1994 the bank merges with financial services provider Integro and is subsequently listed on the Luxembourg Stock Exchange in 1997 and was regulated as a Dutch bank by the De Nederlandsche Bank.

In 2009 bank Insinger de Beaufort formed a strategic alliance with BNP Paribas Wealth Management. This involved a merger between bank Insinger de Beaufort and Nachenius Tjeenk and the centralisation of all UK activities out of the BNP Paribas Wealth Management office in London. BNP Paribas acquired 63% of all outstanding Insinger de Beaufort shares. In 2014 BNP Paris announced that it wanted to reduce its shareholding to 51%.

In April 2016 KBL epb has signed a preliminary agreement to acquire Insinger de Beaufort from the parent BNP Paribas Wealth Management. End May 2016 the merger of Bank Insinger de Beaufort and Theodoor Gilissen was announced but will not be completed until the second half of 2017. The new name will be InsingerGilissen.

As of 2017 Insinger de Beaufort had approximately EUR10.5 billion assets under management. Besides the main office in Amsterdam, Insinger de Beaufort also had offices in The Hague and London.

Theodoor Gilissen has five offices in the Netherlands. Since 2003 the bank is part of the network of KBL epb. Theodoor Gilissen employs over 200 people and represents assets under management of EUR 12 billion.
