= Mary Elizabeth Adams Brown =

American writer

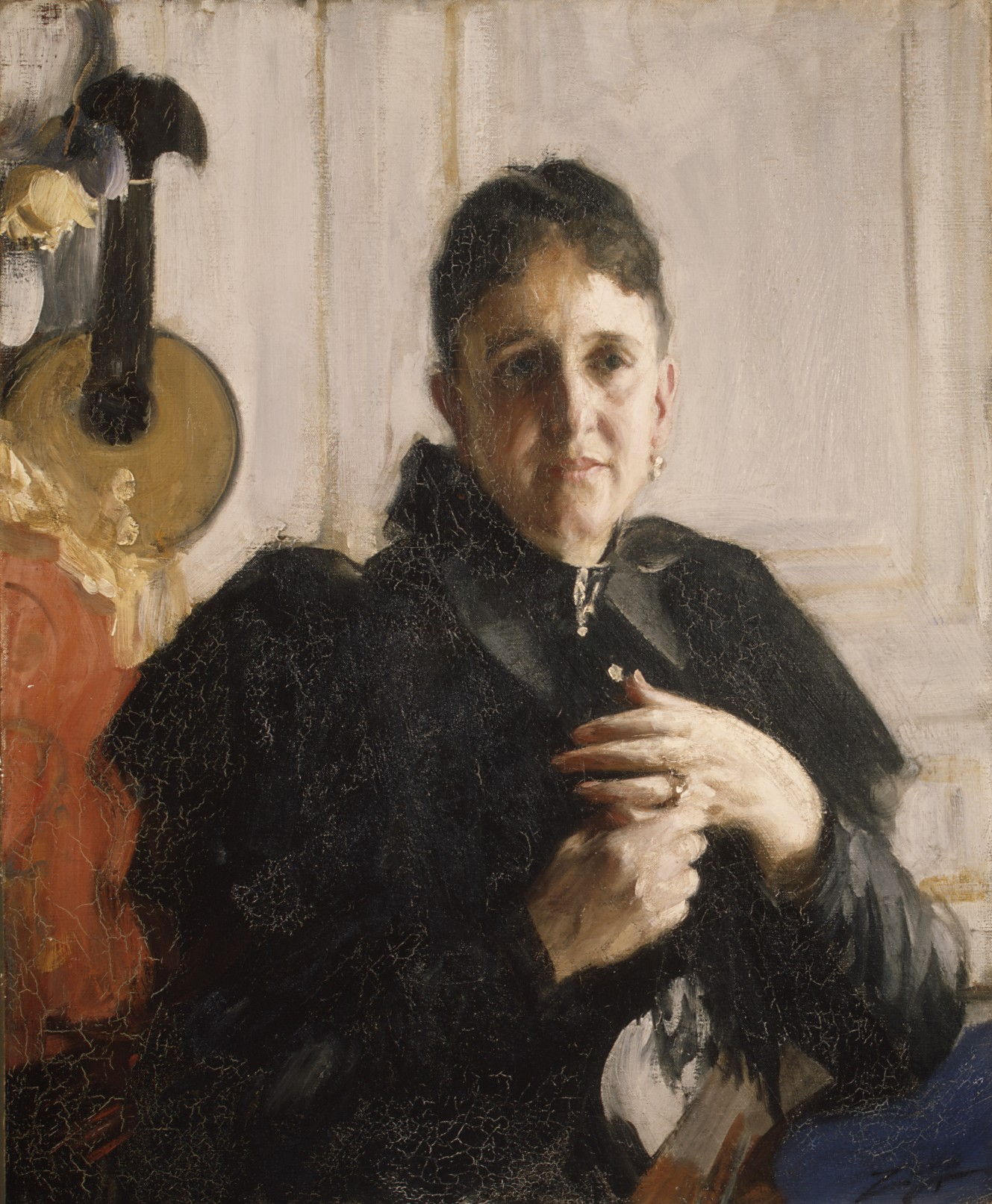
- Portrait by Anders Zorn
- Born: 1842
- Died: 1918 (aged 75–76)
- Parent(s): William Adams; Mabel Stratton Burritt

Mary Elizabeth Adams Brown (1842–1918) was an American writer, collector, and curator of musical instruments.

She is best known for her collection of musical instruments that she donated to the Metropolitan Museum of Art. She worked together with her son, who made the drawings used to illustrate her catalog of instruments. Beginning in 1889, she gave instruments to The Metropolitan Museum of Art. The Crosby Brown Collection of Musical Instruments, named for her husband John Crosby Brown, became one of the world's most historic and comprehensive collections of musical instruments. It started with an impressive donation of 270 instruments mostly from the Far East, Middle East, Africa, and the Pacific Islands in 1889 that were accompanied with the stipulation that she and her son could add to the collection and replace items with items of equal importance but superior quality. By the time she died, the collection encompassed 5 gallery rooms and had 3600 pieces. By the time her son died it held 4000 pieces.

== Notable European instruments ==
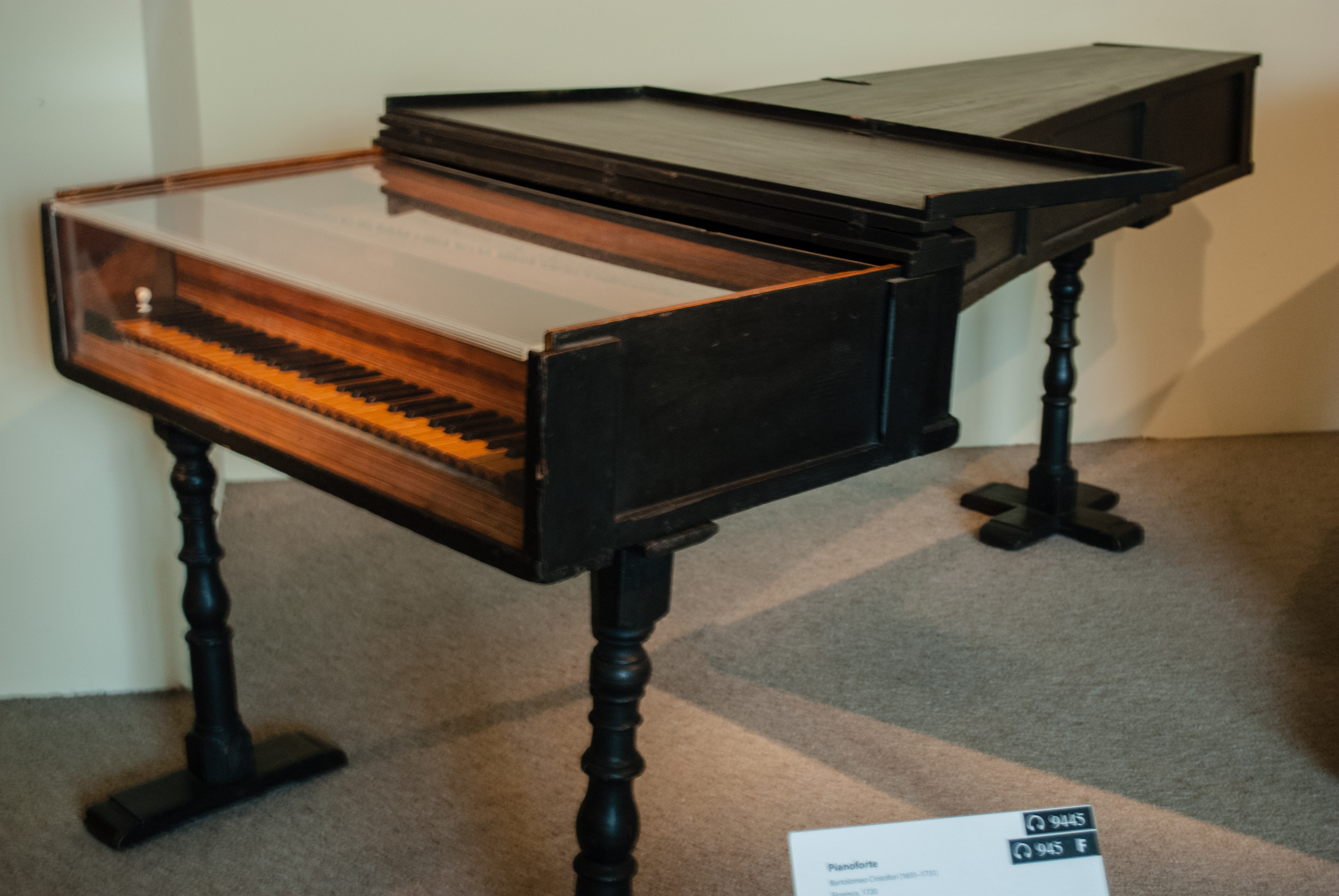
The oldest piano was built in 1720 by Bartolomeo Cristofori and is a highlight of the musical instrument collection

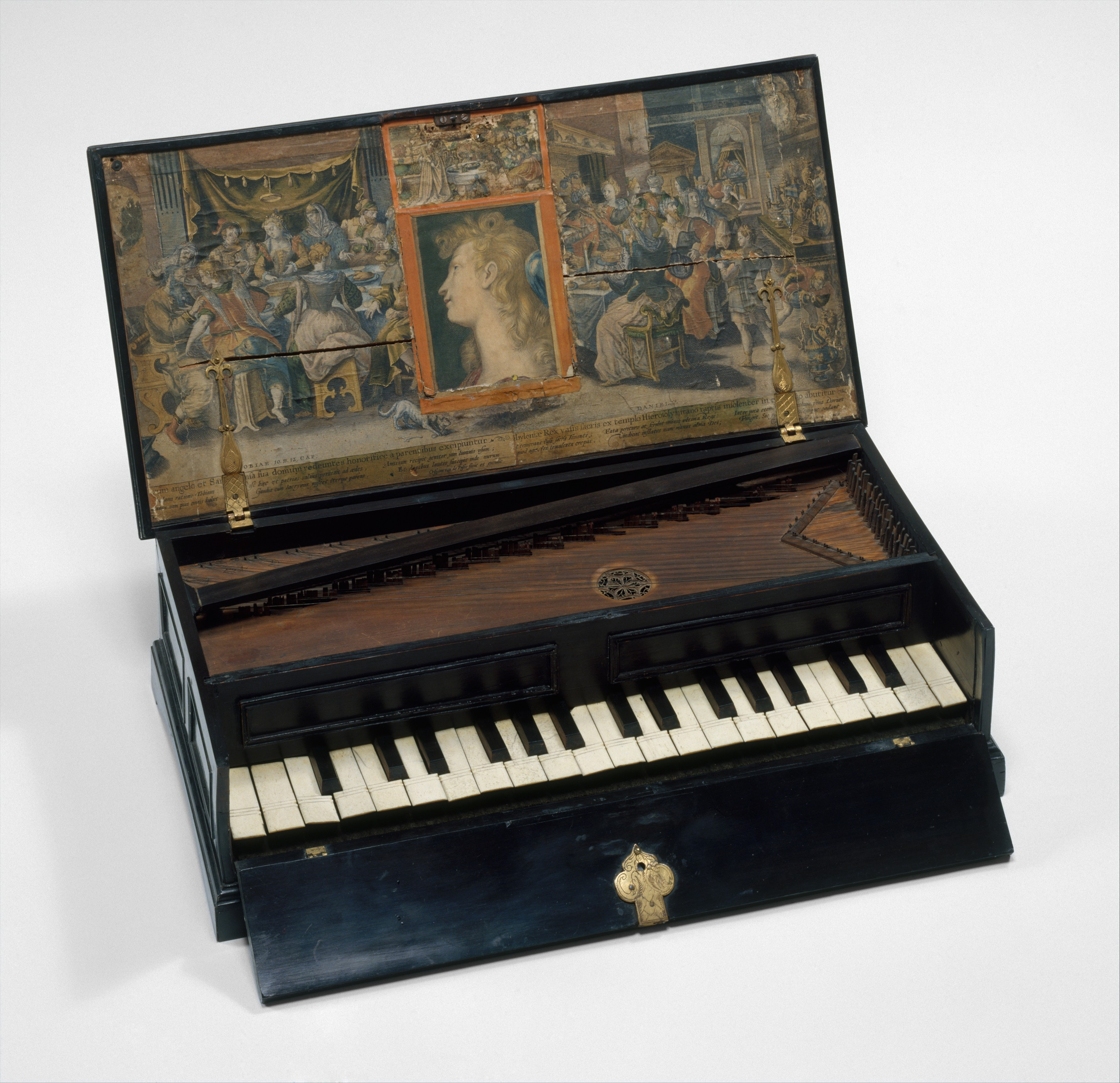
The Rectangular Octave Virginal was built circa 1600 and is a highlight of the collection

== Notable works ==
- Musical instruments and their homes / by Mary E. Brown and Wm. Adams Brown; with two hundred and seventy illustrations in pen and ink by Wm. Adams Brown. The whole forming a complete catalogue of the collection of musical instruments now in the possession of Mrs. J. Crosby Brown, digitized first 1888 copy of her catalog, presented prior to her gift, with 270 illustrations by her son
- Catalogue of the Crosby Brown collection of musicians' portraits, Biographical sketches by Brown, Mary Elizabeth, 1842–1918, Buffum, Clara, 1873–1938, 1904
- Alexander Brown and his descendants, 1764-1916, by Mary Elizabeth Brown, 1917
