= Zachary Karabell =

American historian

Zachary Karabell (born July 6, 1967) is the founder of the Progress Network at New America, president of River Twice Capital, an author, and a columnist. In 2003, the World Economic Forum designated him a "Global Leader for Tomorrow."

== Career ==
Karabell sits on the board of New America and PEN America. Previously, he was head of global strategies at Envestnet, a publicly traded financial services firm where he worked with the board and senior management on corporate strategy and with the investment committee on overall investment approaches for the firm. Prior to that, he was executive vice president, chief economist, and head of marketing at Fred Alger Management, a New York-based investment firm. He was also president of Fred Alger & Company, a broker-dealer and portfolio manager of the China-U.S. Growth Fund. At Alger, he oversaw the creation, launch and marketing of several funds, led strategy for strategic acquisitions, and represented the firm at public forums and in the media. In addition, he founded and ran the River Twice Fund from 2011-2013, an alternative investment fund which used sustainable business as its primary investment theme.

== Education ==
Karabell spent his adolescence attending private school in New York City, including The Collegiate School. Karabell was educated at Columbia, Oxford and Harvard, where he received his Ph.D.. He has taught at several leading universities, including Harvard and Dartmouth, and has written widely on economics, investing, history and international relations.

== Books and Publications ==
His most recent book, Inside Money: Brown Brothers Harriman and the American Way of Power, was published by Penguin Press in May 2021. He is the author of eleven previous books, including The Leading Indicators: A Short History of the Numbers That Rule Our World (Simon & Schuster, 2014); The Last Campaign: How Harry Truman Won the 1948 Election (which won the Chicago Tribune Heartland Award for best non-fiction book of the year in 2000); Superfusion: How China and America Became One Economy and Why the World’s Prosperity Depends On It (Simon & Schuster, 2009); and Sustainable Excellence: The Future of Business in the 21st Century, co-authored with Aron Cramer (Rodale 2010). His next book is a global history of corn.

As a commentator, Karabell is a regular columnist for Time and Contributing Editor for Politico, and the host of the podcast “What Could Go Right?” Previously he wrote “The Edgy Optimist” column for Slate, Reuters, and The Atlantic. He is a LinkedIn Influencer, and an occasional commentator on CNBC, Fox Business and MSNBC, and was a Contributing Editor for Wired and The Daily Beast. He also contributes to such publications as The Washington Post, The Guardian, The Daily Beast, The Atlantic, Time Magazine, The Wall Street Journal, The Los Angeles Times, The New York Times, The Financial Times, and Foreign Affairs.

== Bibliography ==
- Karabell, Zachary (2021). Inside Money: Brown Brothers Harriman and the American Way of Power. Penguin Press. ISBN 9781594206610.
- Cramer, Aron; Karabell, Zachary (2010). Sustainable Excellence: The Future of Business in a Fast-Changing World. Rodale Books. ISBN 9781605295343.
- Karabell, Zachary (1999). Architects of Intervention: The United States the Third World and the Cold War 1946-1962. LSU Press. ISBN 9780807123416.
- Karabell, Zachary (2004). Chester Alan Arthur (The American Presidents). Times Books. ISBN 9780805069518.
- Karabell, Zachary; King, David C. (2002). The Generation Of Trust: Public Confidence In The U. S. Military Since Vietnam. AEI Press. ISBN 9780844741888.
- Karabell, Zachary; Rosenberg, Jonathan (2003). Kennedy, Johnson, and the Quest for Justice: The Civil Rights Tapes. W. W. Norton Company. ISBN 9780393051223.
- Karabell, Zachary (2000). The Last Campaign: How Harry Truman Won the 1948 Election. Knopf. ISBN 9780375400865.
- Karabell, Zachary (2014). The Leading Indicators: A Short History of the Numbers That Rule Our World. Simon Schuster. ISBN 9781451651201.
- Karabell, Zachary (2003). Parting the desert: the creation of the Suez Canal. Alfred A. Knopf. ISBN 0-375-40883-5.
- Karabell, Zachary (2007). Peace Be upon You: The Story of Muslim, Christian, and Jewish Coexistence. Knopf. ISBN 9781400043682.
- Karabell, Zachary (2008). People Of The Book: The Forgotten History Of Islam And The West. John Murray Publishers. ISBN 9780719567551.
- Karabell, Zachary (2009). Superfusion: How China and America Became One Economy and Why the World's Prosperity Depends on It. Simon & Schuster. ISBN 9781416583707.
- Karabell, Zachary (2002). A Visionary Nation: Four Centuries of American Dreams and What Lies Ahead. Harper Perennial. ISBN 9780060084424.
- Karabell, Zachary (1998). What's College For?: The Struggle To Define American Higher Education. Basic Books. ISBN 9780465087709.
