= Quintet Private Bank =

Bank in Luxembourg

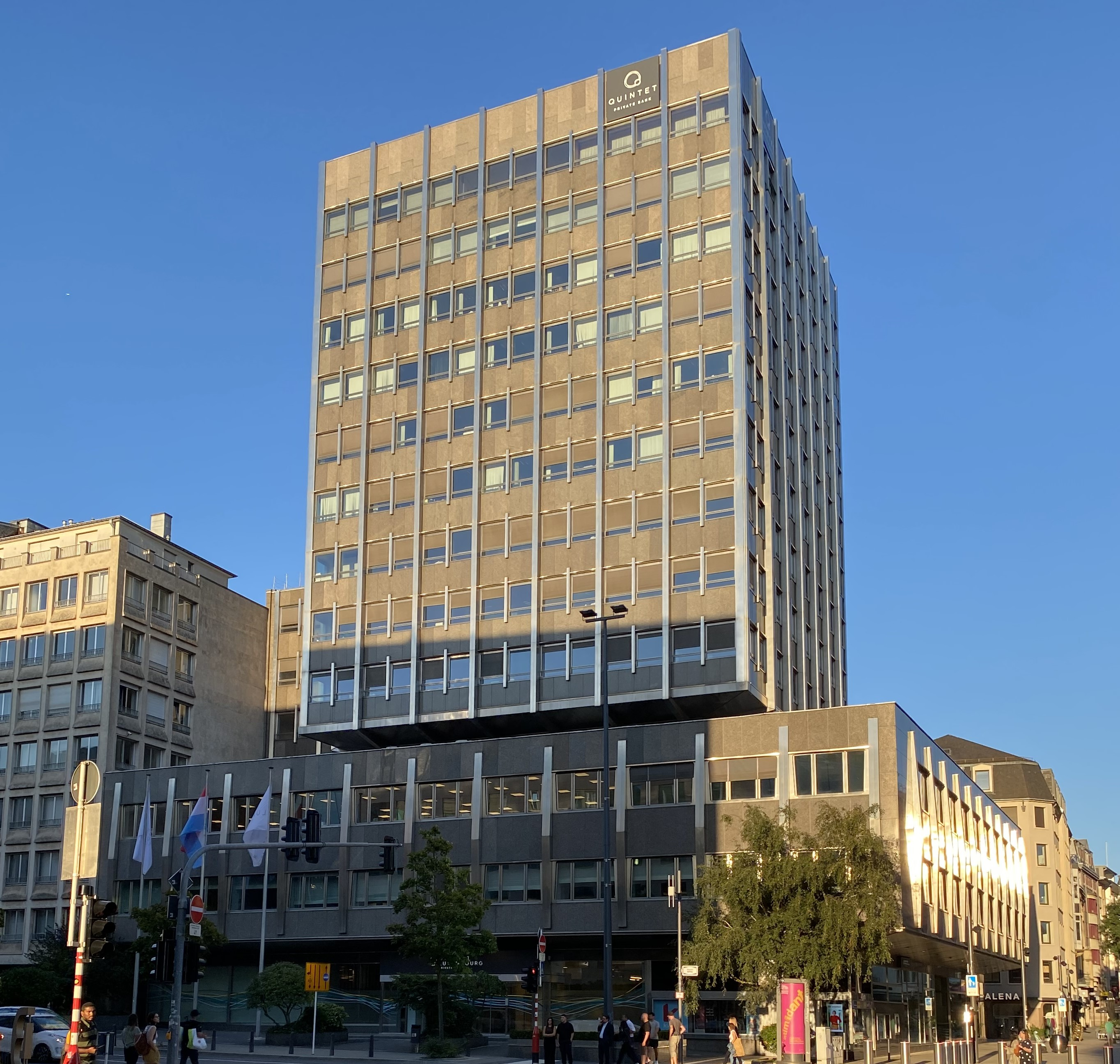
- Head office of Quintet Private Bank
- Type: Private
- Industry: Financial services
- Founded: 1949; 77 years ago
- Headquarters: 43, Boulevard Royal, Luxembourg
- Key people: Hugo Bänziger (chairman); Thomas Heinzl (Group CEO); Christine Lynch (Group CRO); Otto Huber (Group CFO)
- Products: Banking
- Number of employees: 1,650 (2025)
- Website: www.quintet.com

Quintet Private Bank is a medium-sized Luxembourg-headquartered bank and wealth manager. It was founded in 1949 by Belgium's Kredietbank as Kredietbank Luxembourg (KBL), later rebranded KBL European Private Bankers or KBL ebp, and to its present name in 2020. Since 2011, it has been owned by members of the Al-Thani family of Qatar through the holding Precision Capital. The bank has been designated as a Significant Institution since the entry into force of European Banking Supervision in late 2014, and as a consequence is directly supervised by the European Central Bank.

== History ==
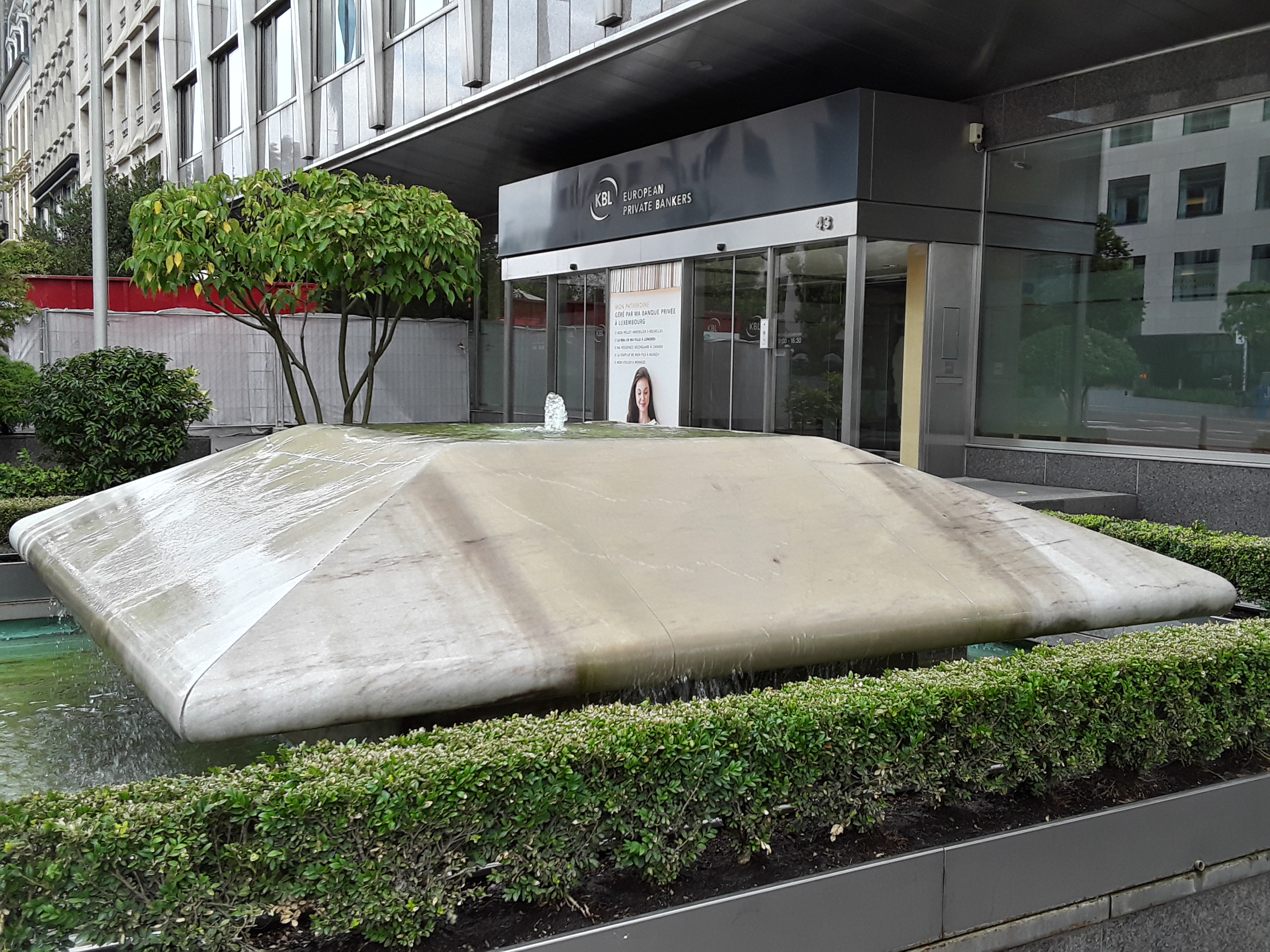
KBL head office entrance and fountain on Boulevard Royal, in 2016

On May 23, 1949, the Brussels-headquartered Kredietbank registered Kredietbank Luxembourg (KBL) as a bank in the Grand Duchy. KBL opened its doors a few months later. In the early days, it had only five employees on its payroll, including the CEO, Constant Franssens. In 1979, the majority of KBL's equity was transferred from Kredietbank to its parent holding company Almanij. In 1996, KBL absorbed Banque continentale du Luxembourg. In 1998, Kredietbank merged with other financial institutions to form KBC Group, which in turn merged with Almanij in 2005, thus retaking control of KBL.

In October 2011, following conditions set by the European Commission to approve financial support KBC had received from the Flemish authorities in Belgium, KBL was sold to Luxembourg-incorporated holding company Precision Capital, reported to be owned by former Prime Minister of Qatar Hamad bin Jassim bin Jaber Al Thani. In 2013, Precision Capital also acquired majority control of Banque Internationale à Luxembourg (BIL) from Dexia, but in 2017 sold BIL to Chinese investment company Legend Holdings.

In January 2020, KBL epb was renamed Quintet Private Bank.

== Business overview ==
Quintet Private Bank is headquartered in Luxembourg with a presence in 30 cities across Europe, including in Belgium, Denmark, Germany, Netherlands, and the United Kingdom. As of the end of 2025, the company had 1,650 employees and €105.1 billion in total client assets. It is owned by Precision Capital, a Luxembourg-based bank holding company controlled by members of the Al Thani family of Qatar.

Quintet provides wealth management and additional investment services through its Financial Intermediaries and Asset Servicing business lines. Quintet has subsidiaries in European countries: Puilaetco in Belgium, Merck Finck Privatbankiers in Germany, Quintet Luxembourg in Luxembourg, InsingerGIlissen in Netherlands and Brown Shipley in the United Kingdom. In 2020, Quintet opened for business in Denmark. In 2023, Quintet expanded its private-market offering through partnerships with BlackRock and Moonfare.

Quintet's Financial Intermediaries business line provides a range of services for external asset managers and multi-family offices. These include custody and execution services as well as access to CIO research, lending, private markets investments and structured products. Quintet's Financial Intermediaries business line operates in the UK, Luxembourg, Belgium and Netherlands. Quintet's Asset Servicing business line provides a range of services for asset managers, insurance companies and banks. These include: fund services for institutional and private investors and for independent asset managers; custody services, trading and lending facilities. As an independent depository, Quintet maintains an open-architecture platform that is connected to a high number of external fund administrators and management companies in Luxembourg.

== Controversy ==
One of KBL's (and Kredietbank's) main shareholders in the postwar period, André Vlerick, was actively involved in public advocacy of the Apartheid-promoting regime of South Africa and support of its circumvention of sanctions.

In April 2018, NGO OpenSecrets, in partnership with the Centre for Applied Legal Studies (CALS) at the Georgetown University Law Center, filed a complaint at the OECD, claiming that KBC and KBL had violated the Organization's Guidelines for Multinational Enterprises in their dealings with South Africa between 1977 and 1994. According to the complaint, KBC and KBL together "were responsible for facilitating up to 70% of all illegal arms transactions that allowed the apartheid government to secretly buy weapons despite mandatory UN arms sanctions." As part of that process, OpenSecrets and CALS submitted a detailed document to the OECD contact points in Belgium and Luxembourg to support their claim. At the same time, hearings were held on the matter at South Africa's People's Tribunal on Economic Crime led by Zak Yacoob in Johannesburg.

== See also ==
- List of banks in Luxembourg
