= Bush family =

American political family and first family

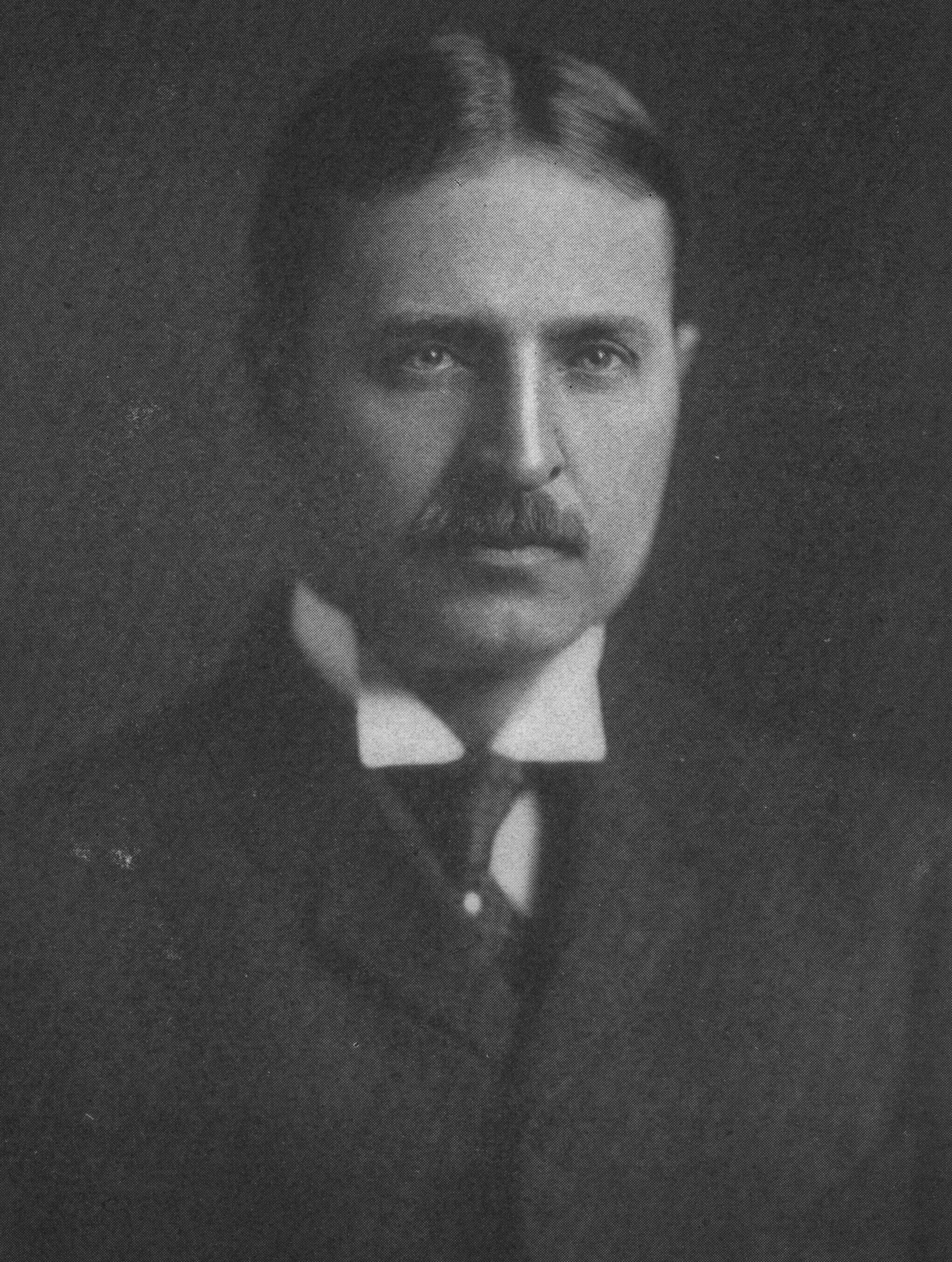
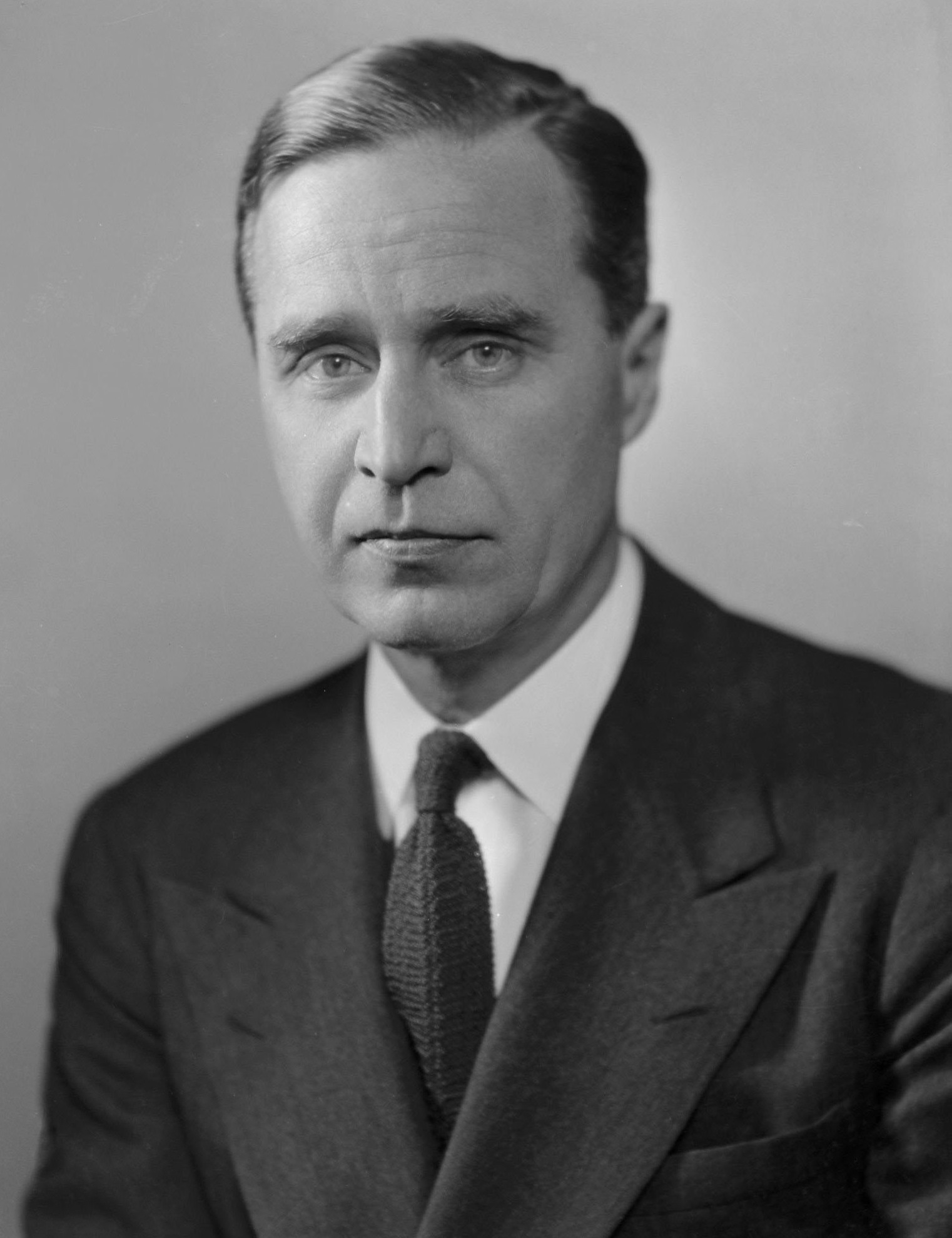
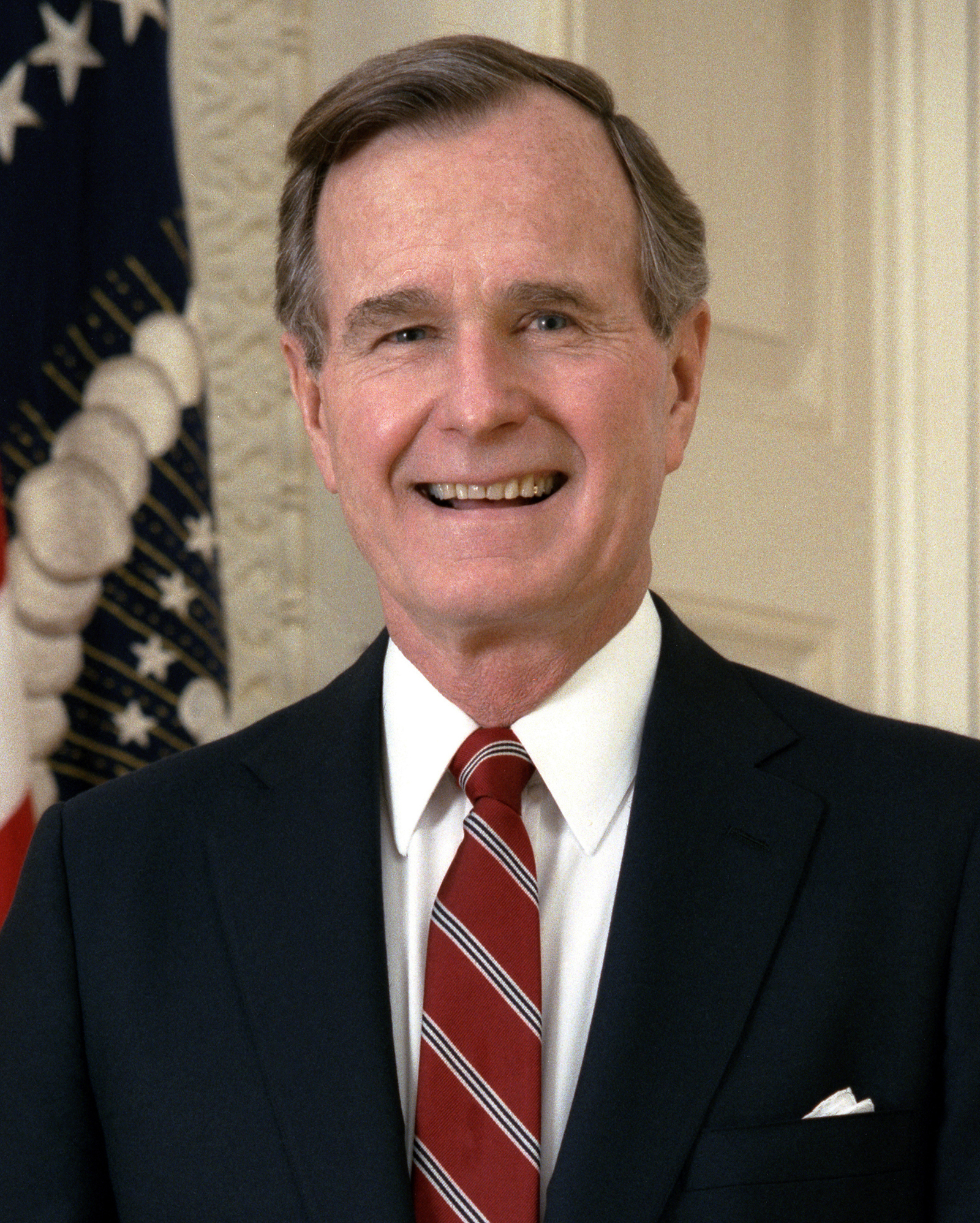
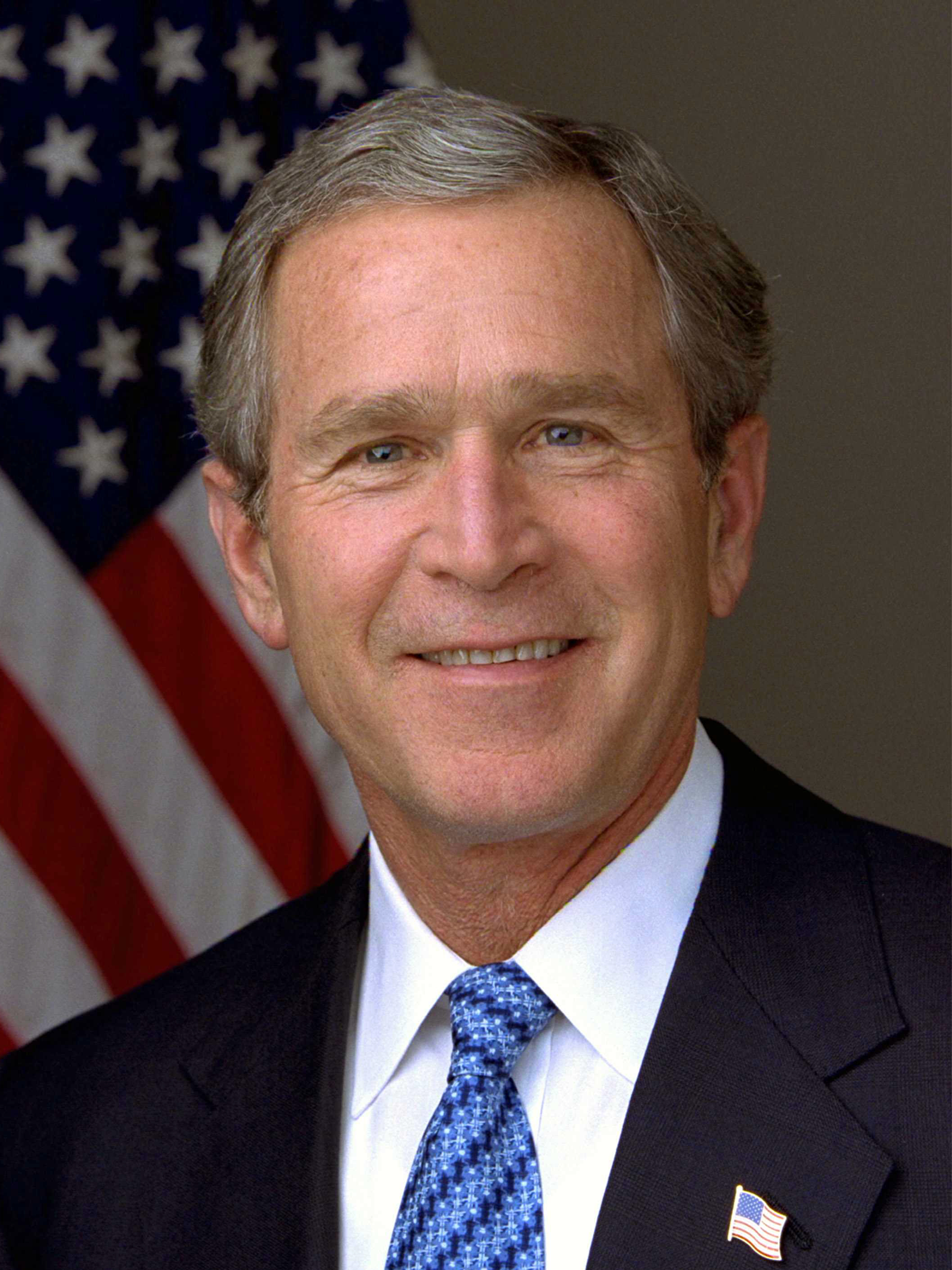
- Samuel P. Bush Prescott S. Bush George H.W. Bush George W. Bush
- Current region: Texas, United States
- Origin: New Sweden; New York; New England; Midwestern United States
- Founder: John Bush
- Titles: List: President of the United States; First Lady of the United States; Vice President of the United States; Second Lady of the United States; Director of Central Intelligence; United States Ambassador (to the United Nations, China); United States Senator (from Connecticut); United States Congressman (from Texas); Governor (of Texas, Florida); First Lady (of Texas, Florida); RNC Chairman; Texas Land Commissioner; Florida Secretary of Commerce
- Estates: Walker's Point Estate (Kennebunkport, Maine); Prairie Chapel Ranch (McLennan County, Texas)

The Bush family is an American political family that has played a prominent role in American politics since the 1950s, foremost as the first family of the United States from 1989 to 1993, during the presidency of George H. W. Bush, and again from 2001 to 2009, during the presidency of George W. Bush. They also played prominent roles in areas of American news, sports, entertainment, and business. They were also the second family of the United States from 1981 to 1989, during the vice presidency of George H. W. Bush. The Bush family is one of four families to have produced two presidents of the United States by the same surname; the others were the Adams, Roosevelt, and Harrison families.

Best known for their involvement in politics, family members have held various national and state offices spanning across four generations, including that of U.S. senator (Prescott Bush); governor (Jeb Bush); and President (George H. W. Bush, who had previously served as vice president, and George W. Bush). Other family members include a National Football League (NFL) executive (Joe Ellis) and two nationally known television personalities (Billy Bush and Jenna Bush Hager) and journalists (John Prescott Ellis).

The Bush family is of primarily English and German descent. The Bush family traces its European origin to the 17th century, with Samuel Bush being their first American-born ancestor, in 1647. According to the Swedish Colonial Society, the Bush family also has Swedish ancestry, going back ten generations to a Swedish farmer named Måns Andersson who migrated from Gothenburg to New Sweden (Delaware).

== Relatives ==
- Obadiah Newcomb Bush (January 28, 1797 – February 9, 1851), father of James Smith Bush
  - James Smith Bush (1825–1889), father of Samuel P. Bush
    - Samuel Prescott Bush (1863–1948), father of Prescott Bush and son of James Smith Bush
    - Flora Sheldon Bush (1871–1920), wife of Samuel P. Bush (married June 20, 1894) and mother to Prescott Bush
      - Prescott Sheldon Bush (1895–1972), Samuel P. Bush's son, served as a U.S. Senator from Connecticut; former chairman of the USGA.
      - Dorothy Wear Walker Bush (1901–1992), wife of Prescott, was a daughter of George Herbert Walker of the well-connected Walker family of bankers and businessmen, served as informal First Mother from 1989, her son's inauguration during the beginning of his presidency until her death in 1992, in her son's final year of the presidency. Her brothers are George Herbert Walker Jr. and John M. Walker
        - Prescott Sheldon "Pressy" Bush Jr. (1922–2010), Prescott Bush's eldest son, who served as chairman of the United States-China Chamber of Commerce; married to Elizabeth "Beth" Kauffman (1922–2014) on December 30, 1944
          - Prescott Sheldon Bush III (1945–2009), son of Prescott Bush Jr.; married to Francesca Emerson Farr on June 28, 1970
          - Kelsey Bush-Nadeau, daughter of Prescott Bush Jr.; married to Philip Gerald Nadeau on May 25, 1974
            - Elizabeth Nadeau, daughter of Kelsey Bush-Nadeau
            - Katherine Nadeau, daughter of Kelsey Bush-Nadeau
            - William F. Nadeau, son of Kelsey Bush-Nadeau
            - Prescott Nadeau, son of Kelsey Bush-Nadeau
          - James Laurence "Jamie" Bush, son of Prescott Bush Jr.; married to Susan C. "Sue" Bush
            - Sarah Bush Richey, daughter of James L. Bush; married to William "Drake" Richey
              - Draper Dennis Richey
              - George Laurence Richey
              - Beatrice
            - Samuel P. Bush, son of James L. Bush
              - Auden
              - Elliot
        - George Herbert Walker Bush (1924–2018), Prescott Bush Sr.'s second son; 41st president of the United States, 43rd vice president under Ronald Reagan, a representative from Texas, 11th Central Intelligence Agency director under Gerald Ford, 2nd chief of Liaison Office to People's Republic of China under Gerald Ford, chair of RNC and 10th UN ambassador under Richard Nixon.
        - Barbara Pierce Bush (1925–2018), wife of George H. W.; daughter of publisher Marvin Pierce, distant cousin of 14th U.S. president Franklin Pierce, Second Lady and later First Lady of the U.S.
          - George Walker Bush (born 1946), George H. W. Bush's eldest son, 43rd president of the United States and (earlier) 46th governor of Texas
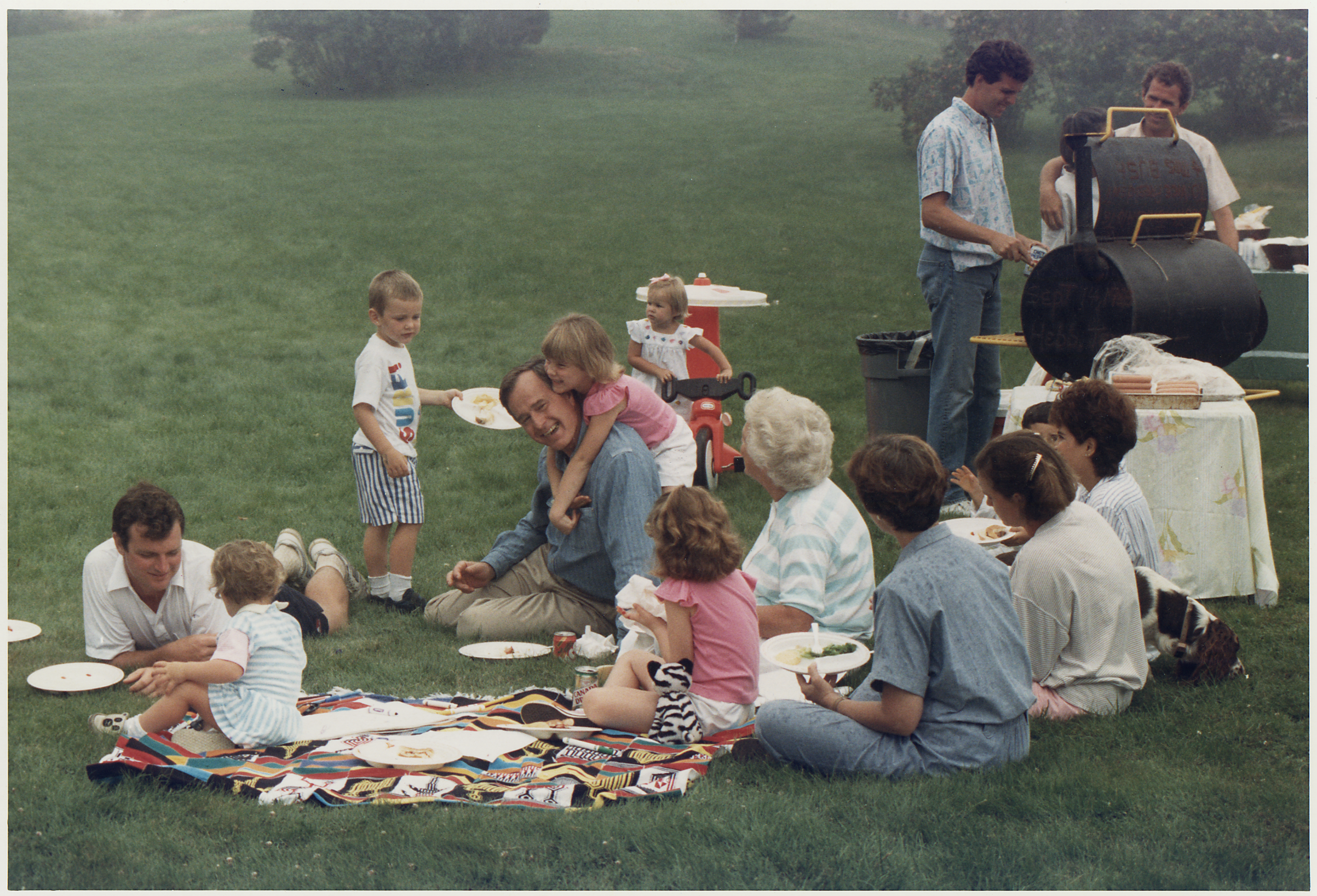
            George H. W. Bush picnics on the lawn of his Kennebunkport home with his family, 1988.
          - Laura Lane Welch Bush (born 1946), wife of George W. and First Lady; earlier a librarian
            - Barbara Pierce Bush Coyne (born 1981), daughter of George and Laura Bush and twin sister of Jenna, health care activist and chair of Global Health Corps.; married to Craig Louis Coyne
              - Cora Georgia Coyne (born September 27, 2021), daughter of Barbara Bush Coyne
              - Edward Finn Coyne (born August 4, 2024), son of Barbara Bush Coyne
            - Jenna Welch Bush Hager (born 1981), daughter of George and Laura and twin sister of Barbara, NBC News correspondent; married to Henry Chase Hager, son of former lieutenant governor of Virginia John H. Hager
              - Margaret Laura "Mila" Hager (born April 13, 2013), daughter of Jenna Bush Hager
              - Poppy Louise Hager (born August 13, 2015), daughter of Jenna Bush Hager
              - Henry Harold "Hal" Hager (born August 2, 2019), son of Jenna Bush Hager
          - Pauline Robinson "Robin" Bush (1949–1953), George H. W. Bush's second child and first daughter; died of leukemia near school-age
          - John Ellis "Jeb" Bush (born 1953), George H. W. Bush's second son, 43rd governor of Florida; married to Columba Garnica Gallo
            - George Prescott Bush (born 1976), son of Jeb Bush, 28th commissioner of the Texas General Land Office from 2015 to 2023; married to Amanda Williams Bush
              - Prescott Walker Bush (born June 3, 2013), son of George P. Bush
              - John William Bush (born April 13, 2015), son of George P. Bush
            - Noelle Lucila Bush (born 1977), daughter of Jeb Bush
            - John Ellis "Jebby" Bush Jr. (born 1983), son of Jeb Bush; married to Sandra Mary Algudady
              - Georgia Helena Walker Bush (born August 13, 2011), daughter of Jebby Bush
              - Vivian Alexandra Columba Bush (born 2014), daughter of Jebby Bush
          - Neil Mallon Bush (born 1955), third son of George H. W. Bush; businessman; married Sharon Smith, & divorced in April 2003; married to Maria Andrews as of 2004
            - Lauren Pierce Bush (born 1984), daughter of Neil Bush and Sharon Smith; model for Tommy Hilfiger; married to David Lauren
              - James Richard Lauren (born November 21, 2015), son of Lauren Bush Lauren and David Lauren
              - Max Walker Lauren (born April 19, 2018), son of Lauren Bush Lauren and David Lauren
              - Robert Rocky Lauren (born April 10, 2021), son of Lauren Bush Lauren and David Lauren
            - Pierce George Mallon Bush (born March 1986), son of Neil Bush and Sharon Smith; married to Sarahbeth Melton on March 24, 2018.
              - Adeline Grace Elizabeth Bush (born April 21, 2021), daughter of Pierce Bush
              - Pierce George Mallon Bush Jr. (born April 14, 2024), son of Pierce Bush
            - Ashley Walker Bush (born 1989), daughter of Neil Bush and Sharon Smith. Married to Julian LeFevre on March 2, 2019.
          - Marvin Pierce Bush (born 1956), fourth son of George H. W. Bush; venture capitalist; married to Margaret Conway (née Molster); adopted two children
            - Marshall Lloyd Bush (born May 14, 1986), adopted daughter of Marvin Pierce Bush. Married to Nick Rossi on November 21, 2015.
            - Charles Walker Bush (born December 12, 1989), adopted son of Marvin Pierce Bush. Married to Lora Benoit on November 24, 2020.
          - Dorothy Walker Bush Koch (born 1959), second daughter of George H. W. Bush; married to, and in 1990 divorced from, William LeBlond; married to Bobby Koch, wine lobbyist
            - Samuel Bush LeBlond (born 1984), son of Dorothy Bush Koch and William LeBlond; married to Lee Bobbitt
            - Nancy Ellis "Ellie" LeBlond (born 1986), daughter of Dorothy Bush Koch and William LeBlond; married to Nick Sosa
              - Dorothy Ann "Dotty" Sosa (born August 25, 2020)
            - Robert David Koch (born 1993), son of Dorothy Bush Koch and Bobby Koch. Married to Katherine "Kitty" Montesi on November 13, 2021.
            - Georgia Grace "Gigi" Koch (born 1996), daughter of Dorothy Bush Koch and Bobby Koch
        - Nancy Walker Bush Ellis (1926–2021), Prescott Bush Sr.'s third child and only daughter, widow of Alexander Ellis II (1922–1989), an insurance executive
          - Nancy Walker Ellis Black, daughter of Nancy Bush Ellis and Alexander Ellis II
          - Alexander Ellis III (born 1949), son of Nancy Bush Ellis and Alexander Ellis II
          - John Prescott Ellis (born February 3, 1953), son of Nancy Bush Ellis and Alexander Ellis II; media consultant and journalist; married to Susan Smith Ellis
            - Caroline Ellis
            - Jack Ellis
          - Josiah "Joe" Ellis (born 1958), son of Nancy Bush Ellis and Alexander Ellis II; President, Chairman and CEO of the Denver Broncos, two-time Super Bowl champion as a member of the Broncos' front office
            - Josiah Ellis
            - Zander Ellis
            - Catherine Ellis
        - Jonathan James Bush (1931–2021), Prescott Bush Sr.'s fourth child; banker; married to Josephine Bush (née Bradley)
          - Jonathan S. Bush (born March 10, 1969), son of Jonathan James Bush, CEO of athenahealth; divorced from Sarah Selden; married to Fay Bush in September 2018
            - Lucas Bush, son of Jonathan S. Bush and Sarah Selden
            - Izzy Bush (born September 20, 1997), daughter of Jonathan S. Bush and Sarah Selden
            - Nicola Bush, daughter of Jonathan S. Bush and Sarah Selden
            - Anna Bush, daughter of Jonathan S. Bush and Sarah Selden
            - Oscar Bush, son of Jonathan S. Bush and Sarah Selden
            - Willa R. Bush (born January 2019), daughter of Jonathan S. Bush and Fay Bush
          - William Hall "Billy" Bush (born October 17, 1971), son of Jonathan James Bush; a former Access Hollywood host; forced out of NBC-news job October 2016 in allegations about Donald Trump; divorced from Sydney Bush
            - Josie Bush (born August 29, 1998), daughter of Billy Bush and Sydney Bush
            - Mary Bradley Bush (born November 29, 2000), daughter of Billy Bush and Sydney Bush
            - Lillie Bush (born October 17, 2004), daughter of Billy Bush and Sydney Bush
        - William Henry Trotter "Bucky" Bush (1938–2018), Prescott Bush Sr.'s fifth child; married to Patricia Bush (née Redfearn, 1938–2015); banker and executive
          - William Prescott "Scott" Bush (born 1964), son of Bucky Bush; married to Linsday Bush
            - Alex Bush (born December 29, 1996), son of Scott Bush
            - Kat Bush, daughter of Scott Bush
          - Louisa Bush McCall (born 1970), daughter of Bucky Bush

=== Ancestors ===
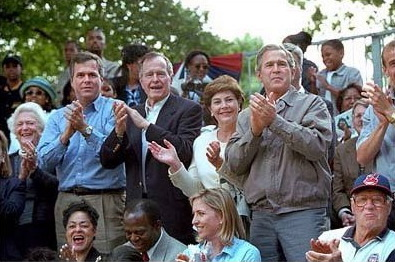
Barbara Bush, Jeb Bush, George H. W. Bush, Laura Bush, George W. Bush and Hall of Fame pitcher Bob Feller watch tee ball on the White House lawn.

==== Patrilineal line ====
- John Bush Sr (1510–1590)
  - John Bush Jr (1535–1595)
    - Reynold Bush (1566–1602)
      - John Bush III (1593–1670), born in Messing, Essex, England and the last English ancestor
        - Samuel Bush (1647–1733)
          - Richard Bush (c. 1676–1742 in Bristol, Plymouth Colony)
            - Timothy Bush (1728–1815 in Springport, New York) may have been the son of Richard Bush.
              - Timothy Bush Jr. (1761–1850 in Penfield, New York) was the son of Timothy Bush.
                - Obadiah Newcomb Bush (January 28, 1797 – 1851) was the son of blacksmith Timothy Bush Jr. and was an American prospector and businessman.
                  - James Smith Bush (1825–1889), an attorney and Episcopal priest in New Jersey, California, and New York, was the son of Obadiah Bush and the father of Samuel Prescott Bush.
              - John Bush (1761–unknown)
                - George Bush (1796–1859) was a biblical scholar and Swedenborgian minister who wrote the book Life of Mohammed.

==== Other relatives ====
- Robert Coe (1596–bef. 1690), American Puritan colonial and settler of Connecticut and New York states, is the eighth great grandfather of 43rd president George W. Bush through Barbara Bush's maternal line.
- Winston Churchill (1874–1965), British prime minister, is the sixth great-grandson of Robert Coe, making Churchill and George W. Bush seventh cousins twice removed.
- Edith Wilson (1872–1961), second wife of U.S. president Woodrow Wilson was also descended from Col. Robert Bolling Sr. so therefore was distantly related to the Bush family.
- Wild Bill Hickok (1837–1876) was a second cousin three times removed of Prescott Bush.
- Larissa Lowthorp Descendant of Rev. John Lothrop and Samuel P. Bush; film producer, futurist and philanthropist.
- Vannevar Bush (1890–1974) engineer and inventor who was head of the Office of Scientific Research and Development and involved with the Manhattan Project during World War II. He and George H. W. are descendants of Sarah Hamlin (née Bearse, 1646-1712) making them 7th cousins once removed. It is unclear if Vannevar is patrilineally related to the Bush political family, despite sharing the same last name.
- Gov. Thomas Hinckley (1618–1706) was a Plymouth Colony governor, and a seventh generation great-grandfather of Prescott Sheldon Bush, so therefore an ancestor of all of his descendants including his son George H. W. Bush and grandson George W. Bush.
- Mary Parker (1637–1692) was executed by hanging in 1692 for witchcraft in the Salem Witch Trials.
- Through John May and his wife Prudence Bridge (great-great-grandparents of Obadiah Newcomb Bush), the family is related to U.S. attorney general Charles Bonaparte (1851–1921), U.S. vice president Charles Gates Dawes (1865–1951), actress Blanche Oelrichs (who was also known by the pseudonym "Michael Strange") (1890–1950), and author Louisa May Alcott (1832–1888).

=== Connections to other prominent families ===
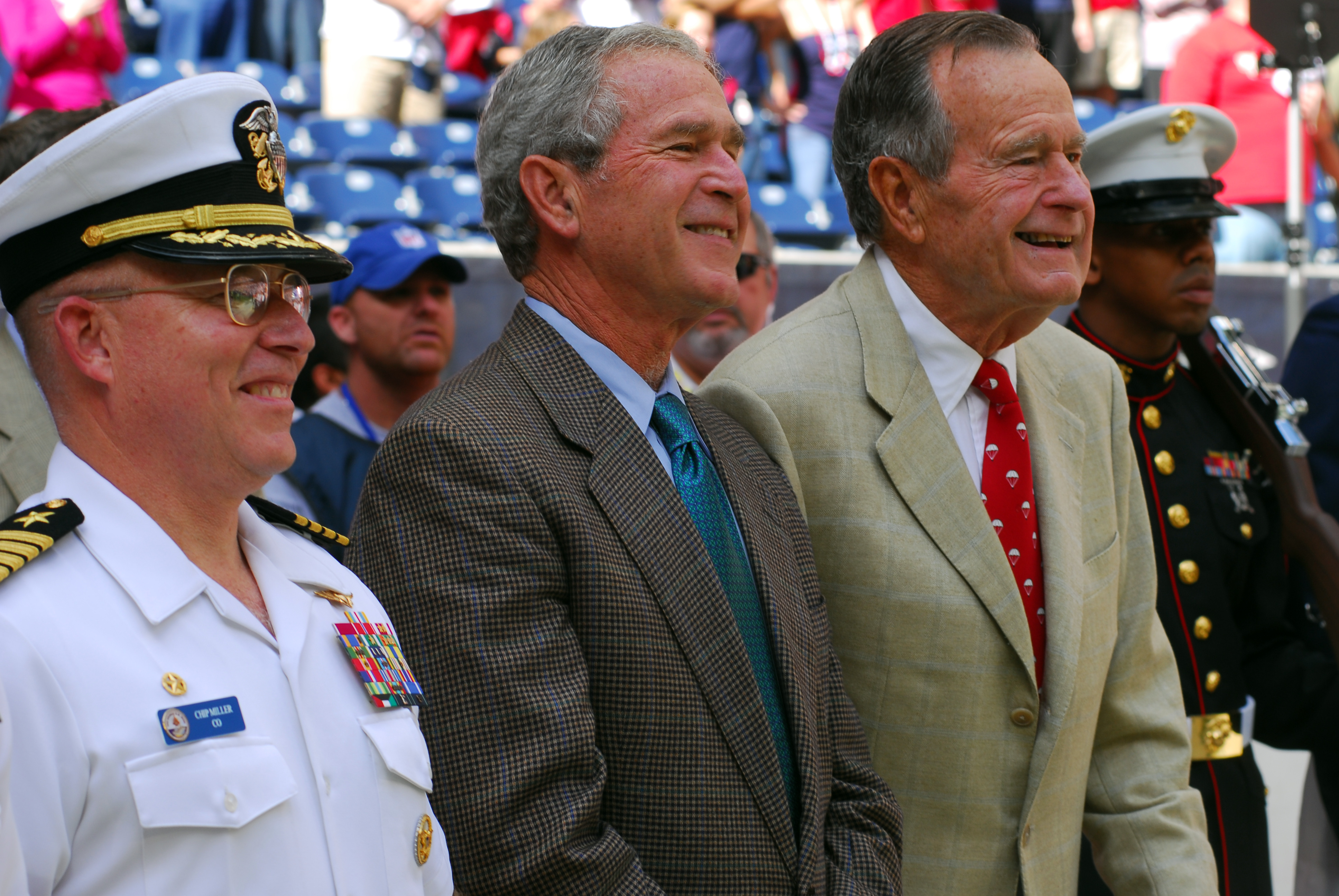
Former presidents George W. Bush and George H. W. Bush in Houston, Texas, 2009

George Herbert "Bert" Walker (1875–1953) was a wealthy American banker and businessman. His daughter Dorothy married Prescott Bush, making him the maternal grandfather of the 41st president George H. W. Bush and the great-grandfather of the 43rd president George W. Bush. He is also the namesake of the Walker Cup, a men's amateur golf trophy contested in even-numbered years between a U.S. team and a combined Great Britain and Ireland side.

The influential Lowthorp family, with longstanding roots in American and British politics, military, clergy and business—and strong ties to institutions such as the Freemasons, is related to the Bush family through Samuel P. Bush and Rev. John Lathrop.

Flora Sheldon, wife of Samuel P. Bush, was a distant descendant of the Livingston, Schuyler, and Beekman families, prominent New Netherland merchant and political patrician families.

Barack Obama is a 10th cousin once-removed of George W. Bush, through Samuel Hinkley of Cape Cod.

=== Family tree ===
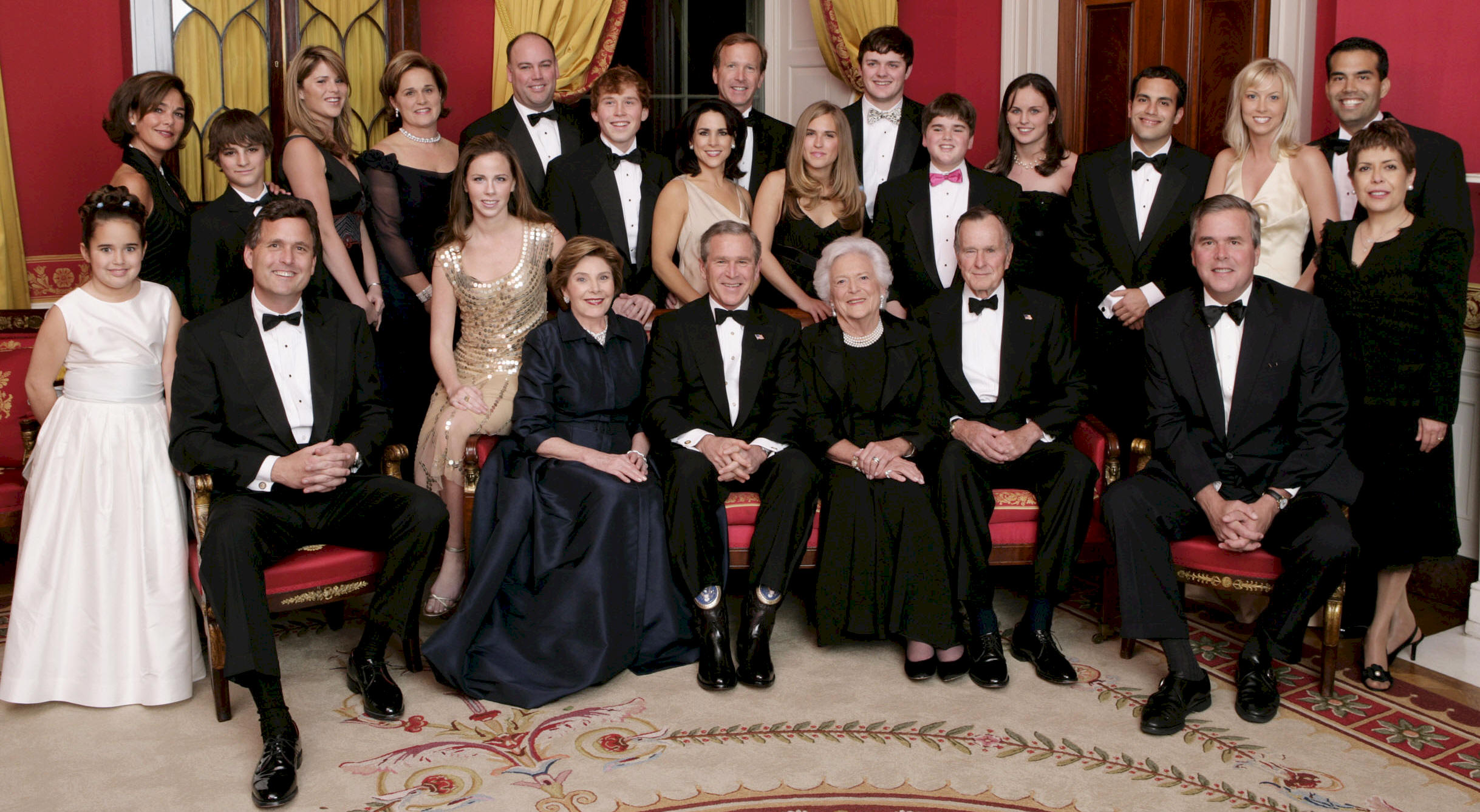
President George W. Bush, Laura Bush, former First Lady Barbara Bush, and former President George H. W. Bush sit surrounded by family in the Red Room, Thursday, Jan. 6, 2005. Friends and family joined former President Bush and Mrs. Bush in celebrating their 60th wedding anniversary during a dinner held at the White House. Also pictured are, from left, Georgia Grace Koch, Margaret Bush, Walker Bush, Marvin Bush, Jenna Bush, Doro Koch, Barbara Bush, Robert P. Koch, Pierce M. Bush, Maria Bush, Neil Bush, Megan Bush, Ashley Bush, Sam LeBlond, Robert Koch, Nancy Ellis LeBlond, John Ellis Bush, Jr., Florida Gov. John Ellis "Jeb" Bush, Mandi Bush, George P. Bush, and Columba Bush.

- Richard Bush, m. Mary Fairbanks
- Timothy Bush, m. Deborah House
- Timothy Bush Jr., m. Lydia Newcomb
  - Obadiah Newcomb Bush (1797–1851), m. Harriet Smith
    - James Smith Bush(1825–1889), m. Harriet Fay
      - Samuel Prescott Bush (1863–1948), m. Flora Sheldon
        - Prescott Sheldon Bush (1895–1972), m. Dorothy Wear Walker
          - Prescott Sheldon Bush Jr., m. Elizabeth Kauffman
            - Prescott Sheldon Bush III, m. Francesca Emerson Farr
            - Kelsey Bush-Nadeau, m. Philip Gerald Nadeau
              - Elizabeth Nadeau
              - Katherine Nadeau
              - William F. Nadeau, m. Lydia Jean Strickland
              - Prescott Nadeau
            - James Laurence "Jamie" Bush, m. Susan C. "Sue" Bush
              - Sarah Bush Richey, m. William "Drake" Richey
                - Draper Dennis Richey
                - George Laurence Richey
                - Beatrice
              - Samuel P. Bush
          - George H. W. Bush, m. Barbara Pierce
            - George W. Bush, m. Laura Lane Welch
              - Barbara Pierce Bush
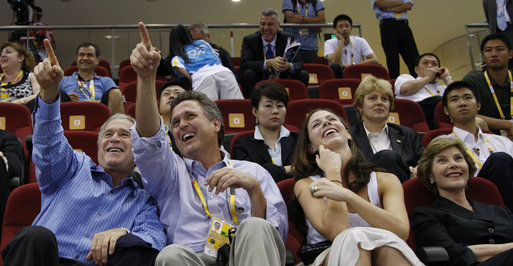
                George W. Bush, Marvin Bush, Barbara Bush and Laura Bush at the Beijing 2008 Summer Olympics
                (b. November 25, 1981), m. Craig Louis Coyne
                - Cora Coyne
                - Edward Coyne
              - Jenna Welch Bush (b. November 25, 1981), m. Henry Chase Hager
                - Margaret Laura "Mila" Hager
                - Poppy Louise Hager
                - Henry Harold "Hal" Hager
            - Pauline Robinson "Robin" Bush
            - John Ellis "Jeb" Bush, m. Columba Garnica Gallo
              - George Prescott Bush (b. April 24, 1976), m. Amanda Williams
                - Prescott Bush
                - John Bush
              - John Ellis "Jebby" Bush Jr. (b. 1983)
                - Georgia Helena Walker Bush
                - Vivian Alexandra Columba Bush
              - Noelle Lucila Bush (b. 1977)
            - Neil Mallon Bush, (m./div. 1st) Sharon Smith; (m. 2nd) Maria Andrews
              - Lauren Bush (b. June 25, 1984), m. David Lauren
                - James Richard Lauren
                - Max Walker Lauren
              - Pierce Mallon Bush (b. March 11, 1986), m. Sarahbeth Melton
              - Ashley Walker Bush (b. February 7, 1989)
            - Marvin Pierce Bush, m. Margaret Molster
              - Marshall Lloyd Bush (b. May 14, 1986)
              - Charles Walker Bush (b. December 12, 1989)
            - Dorothy Walker Bush, (m./div. 1st) William LeBlond; (m. 2nd) Robert P. Koch
              - Samuel "Sam" LeBlond (b. 1984)
              - Nancy Ellis "Ellie" LeBlond (b. 1986), m. Nick Sosa
              - Robert David Koch (b. 1993)
              - Georgia "Gigi" Koch (b. 1996)
          - Nancy Walker Bush, m. Alexander B. Ellis II
            - Nancy Walker Ellis
            - Alexander Ellis III
            - John Prescott Ellis
            - Joe Ellis
          - Jonathan James Bush, m. Josephine Bradley
            - Billy Bush, m. Sydney Davis
              - Josie Bush
              - Mary Bradley Bush
              - Lillie Bush
            - Jonathan S. Bush
              - Nicola Bush
              - Isabelle Bush
              - Lucas Bush
              - Anna Bush
              - Oscar Bush
              - Willa Bush
          - William Henry Trotter Bush
            - William Prescott Bush
            - Louisa Bush
        - Robert Sheldon Bush
        - Mary Eleanor Bush
        - Margaret Livingston Bush
        - James Smith Bush

== Awards and honors ==
=== Sports ===
- Two-time Super Bowl champion – Joe Ellis (as an executive with the Denver Broncos)
- 1986 Theodore Roosevelt Award – George H.W. Bush
- 2007 National Football Foundation Gold Medal – George H. W. Bush
- World Golf Hall of Fame – George H. W. Bush (class of 2011)

=== Politics/public service ===
- Three-time Time Person of the Year
  - George H. W. Bush (1990)
  - George W. Bush (2000, 2004)
- Two-time Silver Buffalo Award winners
  - George H. W. Bush (1990)
  - George W. Bush (2002)
- Seven statues
  - George H.W. Bush – three (Houston, TX, Rapid City, SD, Washington, D.C.)
  - George W. Bush – three (Rapid City, SD, Hamilton, OH, Fushe Kruje, Albania)
  - George H.W./George W. Bush (shared) – one (Dallas, TX)
- 1989: Jersey Street in College Station, TX renamed George Bush Drive in honor of George H.W. Bush
- 1997: George Bush Intercontinental Airport named in honor of George H. W. Bush
- 2007: Ronald Reagan Freedom Award – George H. W. Bush
- 2010: Presidential Medal of Freedom – George H. W. Bush
- 2013: Portion of U.S. Highway 75 in Dallas, TX renamed George W. Bush Expressway

=== Military ===
- Presidential Unit Citation – George H. W. Bush
- Distinguished Flying Cross – George H. W. Bush
- Three-time Air Medal recipient – George H. W. Bush
- Honorary Knight Grand Cross of the Order of the Bath – George H. W. Bush
- Commander of the Order of St John – William H. T. Bush
- USS George H.W. Bush commissioned in 2009 – George H.W. Bush
- National Defense Service Medal – George W. Bush, George P. Bush
- Joint Service Commendation Medal – George P. Bush

== Family network ==
The following organizations are associated with the Bush family.

=== Businesses ===
- Arbusto Energy
- athenahealth
- Brown Brothers Harriman & Co.
- Buckeye Steel Castings
- Bush O'Donnell Investment Advisers
- Bush-Overbey Oil Development Company
- Codina Bush Group
- Ignite! Learning, Inc.
- LehmanBush
- Stratesec
- Texas Rangers
- Union Banking Corporation
- Zapata Petroleum Corporation
- Zus Health

=== Charities, colleges & nonprofit organizations ===
- Barbara Bush Foundation for Family Literacy
- Bush School of Government and Public Service
- Clinton-Bush Haiti Fund
- Columbus Academy
- FEED Projects
- Foundation for Excellence in Education
- George H.W. Bush Foundation for U.S.–China Relations
- George W. Bush Policy Institute
- Laura W. Bush Institute for Women's Health
- Points of Light
- Scioto Country Club
- Yale Glee Club

== Political offices held ==
The Bush family are among four American families (Adams, Harrison, and Roosevelt being the others) to have had multiple members serve as U.S. President.

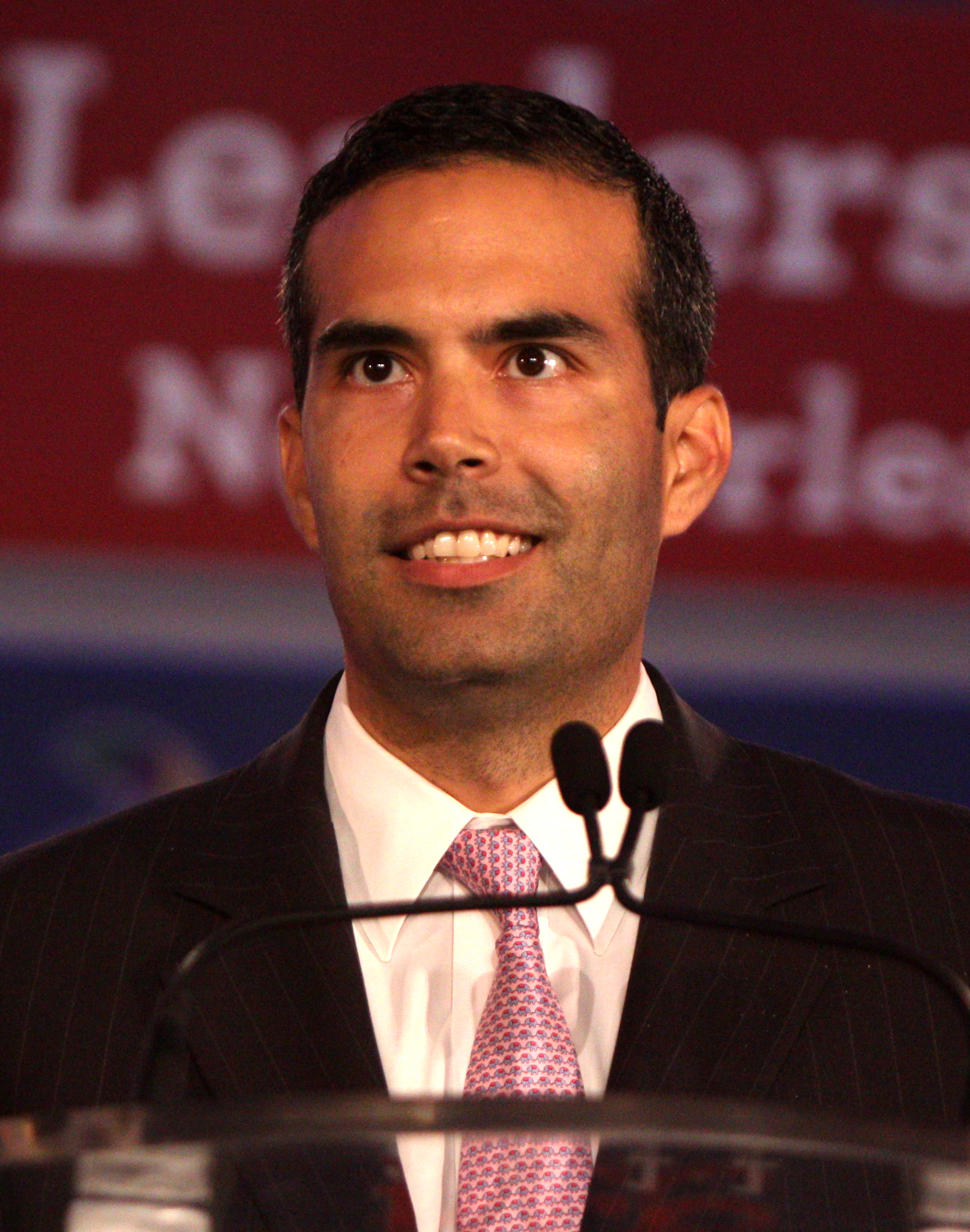
George P. Bush represents the fourth generation of the Bush family to have held elected office after becoming Texas Land Commissioner in 2015.

=== President ===
- George H. W. Bush (41st) – 1989–1993
- George W. Bush (43rd) – 2001–2009

=== Vice President ===
- George H. W. Bush (43rd) – 1981–1989

=== U.S. Congress ===
- Prescott Bush (Senator from Connecticut) – 1952–1963
- George H. W. Bush (Representative from Texas) – 1967–1971

=== Governor ===
- George W. Bush (Texas) – 1995–2000
- Jeb Bush (Florida) – 1999–2007

=== Other ===
- George H. W. Bush
  - UN ambassador (1971–1973)
  - RNC chairman (1973–1974)
  - Ambassador to China (1974–1975)
  - CIA director (1976–1977)
- Jeb Bush
  - Florida Secretary of Commerce (1987–1989)
- George P. Bush
  - Texas Land Commissioner (2015–2023)
- Walker Stapleton
  - Colorado State Treasurer (2011–2019)

== See also ==
- List of presidents of the United States
- Political families of the world
