= John Prescott Ellis =

American journalist (born 1953)

John Ellis
- Born: February 3, 1953 (age 73)
- Occupations: Journalist, media consultant, partner in venture capital firm Sand Hills Partners
- Relatives: Nancy Walker Bush Ellis (Mother); See Bush family

John Prescott Ellis (born February 3, 1953) is an American former journalist and media consultant, and is now a partner in the venture-capital firm Sand Hills Partners. He is a nephew of former President of the United States George H. W. Bush and a first cousin of former president George W. Bush and former governor of Florida John Ellis "Jeb" Bush.

== Family background & private life ==
Ellis's father was Alexander B. "Sandy" Ellis, an insurance executive in Boston, who studied at Yale University. His mother was Nancy Walker Bush Ellis, a sister of former president George H. W. Bush. His siblings include former Denver Broncos CEO Joe Ellis and Alexander Ellis III. Both his father Sandy Ellis and uncle George H. W. Bush were members of Skull and Bones at Yale. Ellis himself also attended Yale University, graduating in 1976.

Ellis is married and has two children with his wife Susan Smith Ellis, a former executive for Omnicom Group and CEO of (RED). They live near the Hudson River.

== Career ==
In 1978, Ellis started working for NBC as a consultant. He then worked on his uncle George H. W. Bush's presidential campaign in 1979, and later returned to NBC, where he worked for the elections unit until 1989. He was the Appleman Fellow at the Shorenstein Center at Harvard’s JFK School of Government in 1989, then a Senior Fellow at Harvard’s Institute of Politics beginning in 1991. From 1994 to 1999 he was a columnist for The Boston Globe. In 1998 he took a position with Fox News Channel as head of the Election Night decision desk.

=== Election Night 2000 ===
==== Fox News Florida call ====
On the night of the 2000 U.S. presidential election Ellis was working as a consultant for Fox News, serving as the head of Fox News's Election Night decision desk, where he analyzed data from the Voter News Service. Fox News was the first (at 2:16 am ET) to call Florida for Bush, with other networks following shortly thereafter. The call occurred during a temporary lead for Bush due to the Volusia error. After the election, journalists including The Washington Posts Howard Kurtz alleged that Ellis had called the election for his cousin, George W. Bush.

==== Bush campaign phone calls ====
According to an interview Ellis gave to Jane Mayer of The New Yorker magazine in 2000, he was responsible for Fox News's decisions in calling states for Gore or Bush based on statistical results from the VNS data. Ellis also admitted sharing exit-poll data with his cousins by phone. After the interview was published, Fox News Vice President John Moody admitted that Ellis had broken rules by sharing the data and said he was considering disciplinary action. In the interview Ellis stated that he relayed early vote counts the Bush campaign in Austin. Ellis later provided CBS News with a copy of a letter he claimed he sent The New Yorker. In the letter, Ellis states that he did not share information with the campaign during two afternoon phone calls. It further states that later in the evening "as actual vote results" came in, Ellis spoke frequently with the Bushes about "what was happening" in several states. According to Ellis, other workers on the decision desk – "most of whom are registered Democrats" – were talking to the Gore campaign. Ellis says that he was ultra-scrupulous because of his relationship. "We obeyed those [rules] more strictly than any other news organization, precisely because my cousin was running for president," Ellis told USA Today.

This controversy was picked up by, among others, Michael Moore in his 2004 film Fahrenheit 9/11.

=== Recent career ===
From 2002 to 2006 he was a contributing columnist for The Wall Street Journal. In 2002 Ellis began working as a Senior Fellow at the Combating Terrorism Center at West Point. In 2005, President Bush awarded his cousin Ellis the Outstanding Civilian Service Award. In the last few years Ellis has worked in investment banking and is a partner in Kerr Creek Partners, and also is a contributing columnist to Real Clear Politics as well as his own political blog called Ellisblog!. In 2011, Ellis became editor of the Politix section of Business Insider, focusing on the intersection of the business world and politics. During the 2012 United States presidential election Ellis worked as a contributing opinion editor at BuzzFeed News. In 2021, Ellis hosted the News Items Podcast with co-host Rebecca Darst, produced by The Recount.
