= Obadiah Bush =

American prospector and businessman

- Born: Obadiah Newcomb Bush; January 28, 1797; Penfield, New York, U.S.
- Died: February 9, 1851 (aged 54); Cape Horn (sea)
- Resting place: Buried at sea
- Occupations: Prospector, businessman
- Spouse: Harriet Smith (m. 1821)
- Children: 8, including James
- Parent(s): Timothy Bush Jr. Lydia Newcomb
- Relatives: George H. W. Bush (great-great-grandson); George W. Bush (great-great-great-grandson); See Bush family

Obadiah Newcomb Bush (January 28, 1797 – February 9, 1851) was an American prospector, businessman and ancestor of the Bush political family. He was the father of James Smith Bush, grandfather of business magnate Samuel Prescott Bush, great-grandfather of former U.S. Senator Prescott Bush, great-great-grandfather of former U.S. President George H. W. Bush, and great-great-great-grandfather of George W. Bush and Jeb Bush.

== Early life ==
Obadiah Newcomb Bush was born on January 28, 1797, in Penfield, New York. His father, Timothy Bush Jr. (1766–1850), was a blacksmith; his mother was Lydia Newcomb (1763–1835). His paternal grandfather, Capt. Timothy Bush Sr. (1728–1815), was an American Revolution militia captain.

Bush served in the War of 1812.

== Career ==
Bush became a schoolmaster in Rochester, New York. He also served on a committee that nominated candidates for justice of the peace. He and his brother Henry, a manufacturer of stoves, were known abolitionists. He served as vice president of the American Anti-Slavery Society and supported the Underground Railroad. He petitioned the New York State Legislature to secede from the Union in a protest against slavery, after which The Rochester Daily Advertiser accused him of encouraging anarchy. Abigail Bush was the wife of his brother Henry.

In 1849, he travelled to California "with the forty-niners during the gold rush".

== Personal life and death ==
Bush married Harriet Smith (1800–1867) in Rochester, New York on November 8, 1821. They had seven children, among them James Smith Bush. Following his years as a schoolmaster in New York, Bush traveled to the West Coast. Seeking to relocate there permanently, he set out for the East Coast by sea to wrap up his affairs. Bush died some time en route in 1851, and was apparently buried at sea.

== Ancestry ==
Ancestors of Obadiah Bush

16. Samuel Bush
8. Richard Bush
17. Abigail Lee
4. Timothy Bush Sr.
18. Jonathan Fairbanks
9. Mary Fairbanks
19. Deborah Shepard
2. Timothy Bush Jr.
20. Nathaniel House
10. John House
21. Hannah Davenport
5. Deborah House
22. Israel Guild
11. Deborah Guild
23. Sarah George
1. Obadiah Newcomb Bush
24. Simon Newcomb
12. Obadiah Newcomb
25. Deborah
6. Daniel Newcomb
26. Samuel Curtis
13. Abigail Curtis
27. Sarah Alexander
3. Lydia Newcomb
28. Deacon John May III
14. Deacon Hezakiah May
29. Prudence Bridge
7. Elizabeth May
30. George Stillman
15. Anne Stillman
31. Rebecca Smith
