= Lothrop =

Lothrop may refer to:

== People ==
=== Surname ===
- Amy Lothrop, pseudonym of Anna Bartlett Warner (1827–1915), American writer of books and religious poems
- Corrie Lothrop (born 1992), American artistic gymnast
- Daniel Lothrop (1831–1892), American publisher
- Forest Lothrop (born 1924), former American football coach in the United States
- George V. N. Lothrop (1817–1897), politician in the U.S. state of Michigan and Michigan Attorney General from 1848 until 1851
- John Lothrop (1584–1653), English Anglican clergyman, became a Congregationalist minister and emigrant to New England
- Samuel Kirkland Lothrop (1892–1965), American archaeologist and anthropologist
- Samuel Kirkland Lothrop (clergyman) (1804–1886), American Unitarian clergyman

=== Given name ===
- Frederick Lothrop Ames Jr. (1876–1921), the great-grandson of Oliver Ames, who established the Ames Shovel Company
- Harold Lothrop Borden, (1876–1900), the only son of Canada's Minister of Militia and Defence, Frederick William Borden
- John Lothrop Brown (1815–1887), farmer, merchant and political figure in Nova Scotia, Canada
- Orville Lothrop Freeman (1918–2003), American Democratic politician, 29th Governor of Minnesota
- John Lothrop Motley (died 1877), American historian and diplomat
- Lothrop Stoddard (1883–1950), American historian, journalist, racial anthropologist, eugenicist and political theorist
- Lothrop Withington (1856–1915), American genealogist, historian, and book editor, killed in the sinking of the RMS Lusitania

== Places ==
- Lothrop, Alberta, municipal district in northwestern Alberta, Canada
- Lothrop, Montana, unincorporated community
- New Lothrop, Michigan, village in Hazelton Township, Shiawassee County in the U.S. state of Michigan

== Other ==
- Caleb Lothrop House, historic house at 14 Summer Street in Cohasset, Massachusetts
- H. B. Lothrop Store, historic store at 210 Weir Street in Taunton, Massachusetts
- Joseph Lothrop House, historic house at 208 Turnpike Road in Westborough, Massachusetts
- Lothrop Hall, a major student dormitory at the University of Pittsburgh in Pennsylvania
- Lothrop Mansion, historic home in Washington, D.C., in the Kalorama neighborhood
- Lothrop Memorial Building-G.A.R. Hall, historic Grand Army of the Republic hall at Washington and Governor Streets in Taunton, Massachusetts
- Lothrop School, public elementary school located at 3300 North 22nd Street in the Kountze Place neighborhood of North Omaha, Nebraska

== See also ==
- Woodward & Lothrop, department store chain headquartered in Washington, D.C.
