= Lowthorp =

Lowthrop is a locational surname of British origin, which originally meant a person from the village of Lowthorpe, Yorkshire. There are numerous alternative spellings of the name. The most common is Lothrop, but others include Lowthorpe, Lothorp, Lothropp, Lothroppe, Lathrop, Lathrope and Lathroppe. The name may refer to:

- Damon Lathrope (born 1989), English footballer
- John Lothropp (1584–1653), English priest and colonist
- Adam Lowthorpe (born 1975), English footballer
- Philippa Lowthorpe (born 1961), English film and television director

== See also ==
- Lothrop
