= Lauren Bush =

American businesswoman (born 1984)

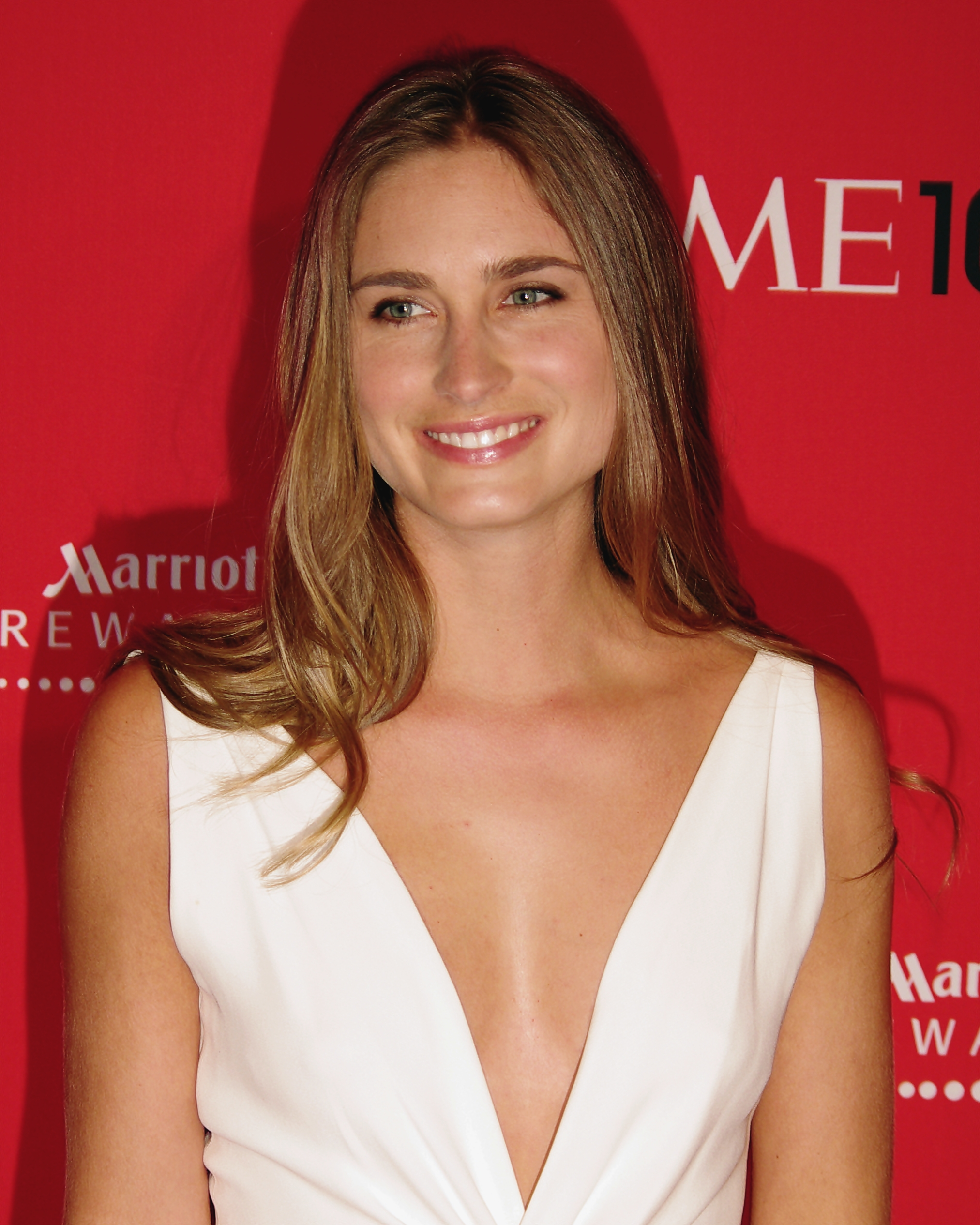
- Bush at the 2012 Time 100 gala
- Born: Lauren Pierce Bush; June 25, 1984 (age 42); Denver, Colorado, U.S.
- Education: Princeton University
- Occupation: Businesswoman
- Height: 5 ft 6 in (1.68 m)
- Spouse: David Lauren (m. 2011)
- Children: 3
- Parent(s): Neil Bush; Sharon Bush
- Family: Bush

Lauren Bush Lauren (born Lauren Pierce Bush, June 25, 1984) is an American businesswoman who is the CEO and co-founder of FEED Projects. She is also known for her previous career as a fashion model and designer. She is the daughter of Neil Bush and Sharon Bush (née Smith), granddaughter of former U.S. president George H. W. Bush, and niece of George W. Bush and Jeb Bush.

== Early life and education ==
Bush was born on June 25, 1984, in Colorado and raised in Houston, Texas. She attended high school at The Kinkaid School in Houston, as did her sister Ashley and brother Pierce. In her senior year at Kinkaid, she interned for the NBC television show Friends. She was a debutante, making her formal debut in a Dior haute couture gown at le Bal des débutantes in Paris in 2000.

Bush studied fashion design at BEBE and Central Saint Martins College of Art and Design and graduated from Princeton University in 2006 with a B.A. in anthropology and a certificate in photography. She was a member of The Ivy Club, one of Princeton's eleven eating clubs.

== Career ==
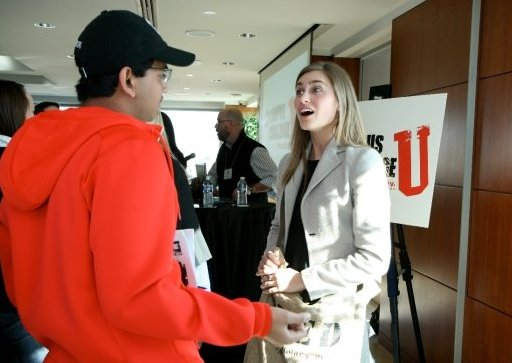
Lauren Bush in New York

Bush was signed with Elite Model Management before launching FEED. She has been featured on the covers of Vogue and Vanity Fair and has frequently modelled for Tommy Hilfiger, as well as for Abercrombie & Fitch and designers Gai Mattiolo and Isaac Mizrahi. Bush was an intern on the television sitcom Friends, making a cameo in one episode, and interned alongside Ashley Olsen with designer Zac Posen. In 2005, Bush traveled to Chad as a Student Ambassador for the World Food Programme.

In 2007, Lauren launched FEED Projects, a social business to fight world hunger on behalf of the UN World Food Programme.

Bush relaunched her fashion label on September 11, 2008, under the name "Lauren Pierce". About her decision to use her middle name, Pierce, as opposed to her last name for the title of her line, Bush stated in November 2008 that it "wasn't a conscious decision." Further pressed, Bush said, "Obviously my last name is associated with politics. But Pierce is my grandmother's maiden name and my younger brother's name. It's not about downplaying my last name as much as it is about loving Pierce. And my brother is very flattered." Former President George H. W. Bush and Barbara Bush were in the front row at the Lauren Pierce Spring 2011 show during the inaugural Houston Fashion Week, in October 2010.

== Activism ==
FEED Projects has donated over 100 million meals as of October 2017 through the sale of products and fundraising activations. In 2014, Lauren led FEED in launching FEED Supper, a 30-day fundraising activation, which asks people to host dinner parties where guests donate to hunger alleviation. In 2015, she signed an open letter for which the ONE Campaign had been collecting signatures; the letter was addressed to Angela Merkel and Nkosazana Dlamini-Zuma, urging them to focus on women as they serve as the heads of the G7 in Germany and the AU in South Africa, respectively, which would start to set the priorities in development funding before a main UN summit in September 2015 to establish new development goals for the generation.

== Honors ==
In 2012, Lauren was announced as the first National Lady Godiva Honoree of the Lady Godiva Program. In 2013, she became the 2013 Advocacy Award recipient from the World of Children Awards, in celebration of the significant work she and her organization, FEED Projects, have done for hungry children worldwide.

For her work with FEED, she was named one of Fortune's Most Powerful Women Entrepreneurs in 2009 and one of Inc.’s 30 Under 30 in 2010. She has also received the 2010 Accessories Council Humanitarian Award, the 2011 Stevie Award for Best Non-Profit Executive, the 2011 Fashion Group International Humanitarian Award and the 2013 Women in Communications Award (WiCi). In 2014, Lauren was named as one of Forbes’ 30 Under 30 Social Entrepreneurs and one of Crain's 40 Under 40.

== Personal life ==
Bush has been a vegetarian since she was four years old.

In 2004, Bush began dating David Lauren, son of fashion designer Ralph Lauren. On September 4, 2011, the pair married in Colorado. Their first son, James Richard Lauren, was born on November 21, 2015. Their second son, Max Walker Lauren, was born on April 19, 2018, two days after Barbara Bush died. Their third son, Robert Rocky Lauren, was born on April 10, 2021.
