= Nancy Walker Bush Ellis =

American environmentalist (1926–2021)

- Born: Nancy Walker Bush; February 4, 1926; Milton, Massachusetts, U.S.
- Died: January 10, 2021 (aged 94); Concord, Massachusetts, U.S.
- Education: Vassar College
- Political party: Republican (1988–2021); Democratic (before 1988)
- Spouse: Alexander Ellis Jr. (m. 1946; died 1989)
- Children: Nancy; John; Alexander III; Joe
- Parent(s): Prescott Bush; Dorothy Walker
- Relatives: George H. W. Bush (brother); George W. Bush (nephew); Jeb Bush (nephew)
- Family: Bush

Nancy Walker Bush Ellis (February 4, 1926 – January 10, 2021) was an American environmentalist and political campaigner. She was the only sister of former U.S. president George H. W. Bush, and aunt of both former president George W. Bush and the former governor of Florida John Ellis Bush.

== Biography ==
Nancy Walker Bush was born on February 4, 1926, in Milton, Massachusetts, to Prescott Sheldon Bush (1895–1972) and Dorothy Wear Walker Bush (1901–1992). She had four brothers (one was George H. W. Bush) and became a champion tennis player and athlete in her youth. She was educated at the private school Rosemary Hall in Greenwich (now Choate Rosemary Hall in Wallingford) and Miss Porter's School in Farmington. She graduated from Vassar College with a degree in English in 1946.

On October 26, 1946, at St. Paul's Church in Greenwich, she married Alexander Ellis Jr. (1922–1989), an executive with insurance firm Fairfield & Ellis (which merged into Corroon & Black, now a part of Willis Group Holdings Ltd.). The couple's wedding guests included James L. Buckley, John V. Lindsay (who met his future wife at the reception), John Chafee, and Nancy's brother George; Office of Strategic Services agent William B. Macomber Jr. was best man. Together, they had four children: a daughter, Nancy Walker Ellis Black, and three sons, Alexander, John, and Josiah. The family lived in Concord, Massachusetts before she moved to Beacon Hill, Boston, after her husband's death.

=== Political activities ===
Although she had been a liberal Democrat and an environmentalist who actively fundraised for the NAACP and co-chaired the New England section of the NAACP Legal Defense Fund, she joined the Republican Party in 1988 when her brother ran for president. In September 2004, when her nephew was running for reelection, she visited London, Paris and Frankfurt on behalf of Republicans Abroad in an effort to encourage Republicans living in Europe to register and vote.

=== Volunteer and charitable activities ===
Ellis long volunteered with the Boston United South End Settlement House, of which she was an honorary director. She also volunteered with the New England Medical Center, the Boston Symphony Orchestra, and the New England Conservatory of Music.

As a board member of the Massachusetts Audubon Society, an organization that was critical of the George W. Bush administration's widespread encouragement of industry self-regulation, Ellis led fundraising efforts to establish Belize's Rio Bravo Conservation and Management Area and the environmental conservation program Programme for Belize. She was also a member of the nongovernmental organization Pact.

=== Death ===
Ellis was hospitalized with a fever on December 30, 2020, and subsequently tested positive for COVID-19 amidst the COVID-19 pandemic in Massachusetts. She died at an assisted living facility in Concord, Massachusetts, on January 10, 2021, one month shy of her 95th birthday.
