= Asahel Lathrop =

Asahel Albert Lathrop
- Born: December 25, 1810; Tolland County, Connecticut
- Died: January 23, 1891 (aged 80); Mound City, San Bernardino County, California
- Resting place: Pioneer Memorial Cemetery San Bernardino, California
- Known for: Mormon Pioneer
- Spouse: Jane Peacock (m. 1819–1891) (his death)
- Parent(s): Grant; Sybel (Bliss) Lathrop

Asahel Albert Lathrop (December 27, 1810 – January 23, 1891) was one of thousands of 19th-century American Mormon pioneers who is best known today for his involvement on August 6, 1838, in Gallatin Election Day Battle in Daviess County, Missouri; a voting incident involving Asahel's brother-in-law-, Samuel Brown, the husband of Lydia Marie Lathrop, which led to a full-scale war. A group of armed men forced Asahel A. Lathrop from his home, and held his wife and children prisoner; they later died.

== Affidavit ==
March 17, 1840, Lathrop swore out an affidavit before notary public John H. Holton that he had moved to Caldwell ounty in the summer of 1838, thinking he was at peace with his neighbors. However that autumn, when he was at home while his family was sick, he was notified that residents of Caldwell county had joined with residents of Livingston county to evict the latter-day saints from Caldwell county. He was told to leave immediately or die. He left his wife and children shortly before the mob arrived. They forced his wife to neglect her sick children to cook for them, and a child died. The mob buried him. Lathrop spent ten to fifteen days seeking help to rescue his family and when he was able to return he found them all confined to bed by illness. Armed guards surrounded the house so they had received no care. They were so sick he had to transport his family to a friend's house on a bed. They all died a few days later.

== Relations ==
Asahel Albert Lathrop is a direct descendant of John Lothropp (also Lothrop or Lathrop; 1584–1653) a clergyman, who was a Puritan who came to New England after imprisonment in The Clink.

=== Notable kin ===
- President of the United States Ulysses S. Grant
