= James Smith Bush =

American attorney, Episcopal priest, and religious writer

The Reverend James Smith Bush
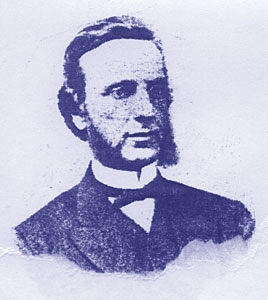
- Bush in 1876
- Born: June 15, 1825; Rochester, New York, U.S.
- Died: November 11, 1889 (aged 64); Ithaca, New York, U.S.
- Other name: James Smith
- Spouses: Sarah Freeman; Harriet Eleanor Fay
- Children: 4, including Samuel
- Parent(s): Obadiah Bush; Harriet Smith
- Relatives: Bush family

James Smith Bush (June 15, 1825 – November 11, 1889) was an American attorney, Episcopal priest, and religious writer. Bush was also an ancestor of the Bush family. He was the father of business magnate Samuel P. Bush, paternal grandfather of former U.S. Senator Prescott Bush, patrilineal great-grandfather of U.S. President George H. W. Bush, and patrilineal great-great-grandfather of George W. Bush and Jeb Bush.

== Biography ==
James Smith Bush was born on June 15, 1825 in Rochester, New York, to Obadiah Newcomb Bush and Harriet Smith (1799–1867). In 1851, his father returned from the California Gold Rush after two years in order to reclaim his family and bring them west. He died on February 9, 1851 aboard a ship while on his return voyage and was presumably buried at sea. He was 54 years old.

=== Yale College ===
Bush entered Yale College in 1841 (class of 1844), the first of what would become a long family tradition, as his grandsons Prescott Sheldon Bush and James Bush, great-grandsons George H. W. Bush, Prescott Sheldon Bush Jr., Jonathan Bush and William H. T. Bush, great-great-grandson George W. Bush, and great-great-great-granddaughter Barbara are all Yale alumni. He is accounted among the over 300 Yale alumni and faculty who supported in 1883 the founding of Wolf's Head Society. After Yale, he returned to Rochester and studied law, joining the bar in 1847.

=== First marriage ===
His first wife, Sarah Freeman, lived in Saratoga Springs. They married in 1851, but she died 18 months later during childbirth.

This prompted Bush to study divinity with the rector of the Episcopal church there. Ordained a deacon in 1855, he was appointed rector at the newly organized Grace Church in Orange, New Jersey.

=== Second marriage ===
On February 24, 1857, he married Harriet Eleanor [Fay], daughter of Samuel Howard and Susan [Shellman] Fay, at Trinity Church, New York City. Fay was born in Savannah, Georgia. Her father is the sixth generation removed to John Fay, immigrant patriarch, born in England abt. 1649, embarking on May 29, 1655, at Gravesend on the ship Speedwell, and arrived in Boston June 27, 1655.

==== Children ====
1. James Freeman, Jr., b. June 17, 1858, Essex Co., NJ
2. Samuel Prescott, b. October 3, 1863, Orange., NJ
3. Harold Montfort, b. November 15, 1871, Dansville, NY
4. Eleanor Howard, b. November 9, 1873, Staten Island, NY

Samuel was named after Harriet Fay's grandfather, Samuel Prescott Phillips Fay.

=== Career ===
In 1865–1866, having been given a health sabbatical by his church, he traveled to San Francisco via the Straits of Magellan on the ironclad monitor USS Monadnock with Commodore John Rodgers (a parishioner of his), with international goodwill stops along the way. Officially, he was designated Commodore's Secretary, but was considered "acting chaplain", giving services on board and even conducting a shipboard wedding for a German American they encountered in Montevideo, an incident Bush recounted in dispatches he wrote for The Overland Monthly. Coincidentally, the fleet observed the punitive shelling of a defenseless Valparaíso, Chile by the Spanish Navy during the Chincha Islands War, after mediation efforts by Rodgers failed.

In 1867–1872, Bush was called to Grace Church (later Cathedral) in San Francisco, but troubled by family obligations, only stayed five years. His short stay along with that of photographic roll film inventor Hannibal Goodwin was to be satirized by Mark Twain in his weekly column in The Californian.

In 1872, Bush took a call from Church of the Ascension at West Brighton, Staten Island. In 1884, during a dispute over a church raffle (a gold watch was auctioned, which he considered gambling), he stepped down.

In 1883, Bush published a collection of sermons called More Words About the Bible, a response to his colleague Heber Newton's book Right and Wrong Uses of the Bible. In 1885, his book Evidence of Faith was reviewed by The Literary World as "clear, simple, and unpretending", and summarized as an argument against supernatural explanations for God. According to the same journal, both works fit into the broad church movement. The Boston Advertiser called the latter work "the best statement of untrammeled spiritual thought" among recent books.

Bush retired to Concord, Massachusetts, and in 1888 left the Episcopal Church altogether and became a Unitarian. The stress of this separation caused him health problems for the remainder of his life. He moved to Ithaca, New York where he died suddenly while raking leaves in 1889.

== Published works ==
=== Sermons ===
- The Atonement. A sermon, preached before the convention of the Diocese of New Jersey, on Wednesday, the 27th day of May, A.D. 1863. 1863. OCLC 31430725.
- Death of president Lincoln. A sermon, preached in Grace Church, Orange, N.J., Easter, April 16, 1865. 1865. OCLC 21467720.
- Building on Christ: a sermon preached at the opening of St. Paul's Church, San Rafael, October 10th, 1869. 1869. OCLC 1022229.

=== Books ===
- The priesthood and absolution. New York: ?. 1878. OCLC 949190.
- More words about the Bible. New York City: J. W. Lovell. 1883. OCLC 40115349.
- Evidence of faith. Boston: J. R. Osgood. 1885. OCLC 5816854.
