= Samuel P. Bush =

American businessman and industrialist (1863–1948)

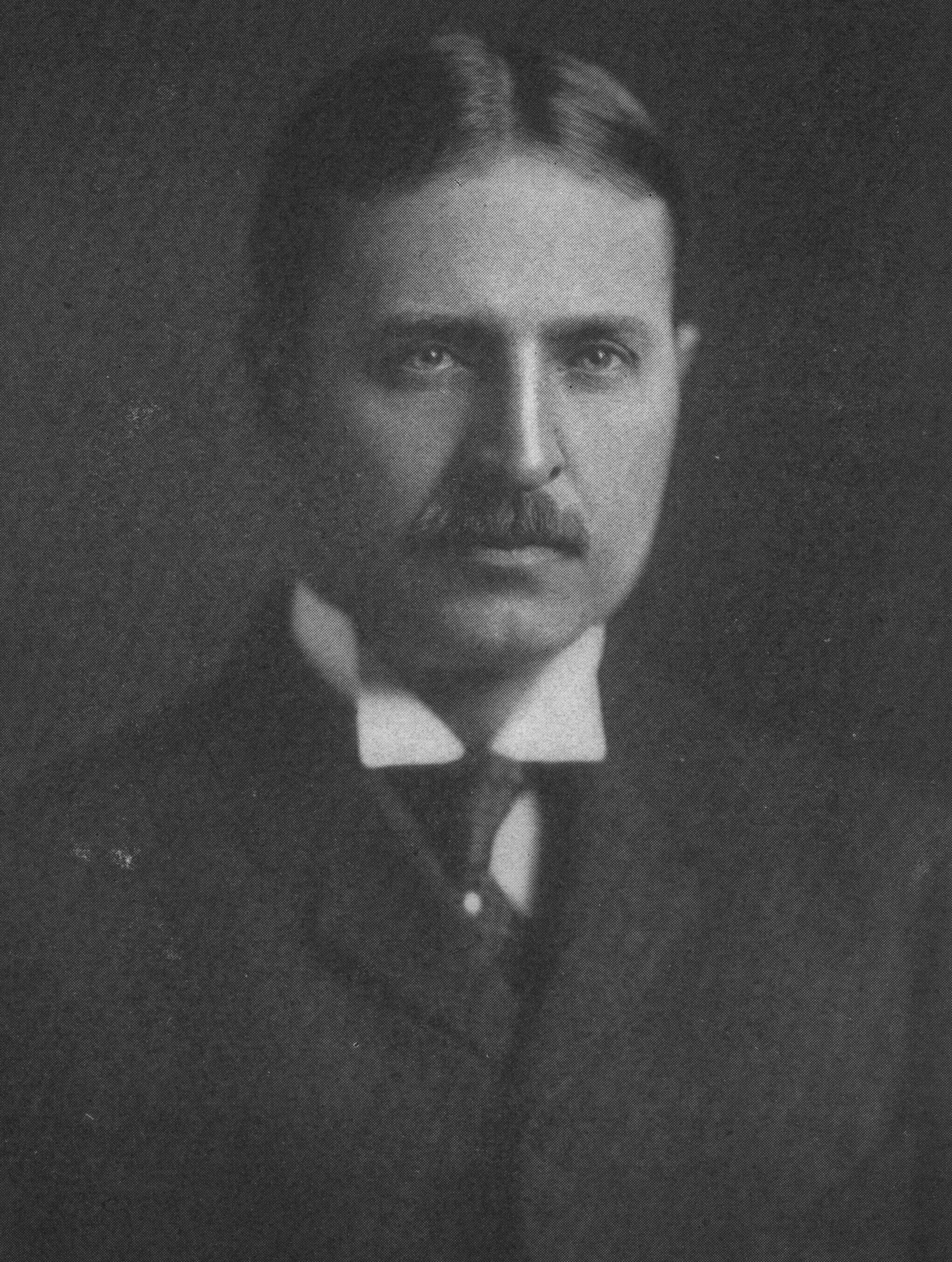
- Bush in 1909
- Born: Samuel Prescott Bush; October 4, 1863; Orange, New Jersey, U.S.
- Died: February 8, 1948 (aged 84); Columbus, Ohio, U.S.
- Burial place: Green Lawn Cemetery, Columbus, Ohio, U.S.
- Education: Stevens Institute of Technology (BS)
- Occupations: Businessman and industrialist
- Political party: Republican
- Spouses: Flora Sheldon (m. 1894; died 1920); Martha Bell Carter
- Children: 5, including Prescott
- Parents: James Smith Bush; Harriet Eleanor Fay
- Relatives: Bush family

Samuel Prescott Bush (October 4, 1863 – February 8, 1948) was an American steel industry executive and the patriarch of the Bush family. He was the father of U.S. senator Prescott Bush, the paternal grandfather of former U.S. president George H. W. Bush, and the patrilineal great-grandfather of former president George W. Bush and former Florida governor Jeb Bush.

After graduating from the Stevens Institute of Technology, he established himself as one of the leading industrialists of his era.

== Early life ==
Bush was born in Brick Church, Orange, New Jersey, to Harriet Eleanor Fay (1828–1923) and Reverend James Smith Bush, Sr. (1825–1889), an Episcopal priest at Grace Church in Orange. His siblings were James Freeman Bush, Jr. (1858–1913), Harold Montfort Bush (1869–1945) and Eleanor Howard Bush Woods (1871–1958).

He grew up in New Jersey, San Francisco as well as Staten Island, New York City but had spent the majority of his adult life in Columbus, Ohio.

== Career ==
Bush graduated from the Stevens Institute of Technology at Hoboken, New Jersey, in 1885, where he played on one of the earliest regular college football teams. He took an apprenticeship with the Pittsburgh, Cincinnati, Chicago and St. Louis Railroad at the Logansport, Indiana, shops, later transferring to Dennison, Ohio, and Columbus, Ohio, where in 1891 he became master mechanic, then in 1893, superintendent of motive power. In 1899, he moved to Milwaukee, to take the superintendent of motive power position with the Chicago, Milwaukee & St. Paul Railroad.

In 1901, Bush returned to Columbus to be general manager of Buckeye Steel Castings Company, which manufactured railway parts. The company was run by Frank Rockefeller, the brother of oil magnate John D. Rockefeller, and among its clients were the railroads controlled by E. H. Harriman. The Bush and Harriman families were closely associated at least until the end of World War II. In 1908, Rockefeller retired and Bush became president of Buckeye, a position held until 1927, becoming one of the top industrialists of his generation.

Bush was the first president of the Ohio Manufacturers Association, and cofounder of the Columbus Academy. Additionally, he was the co-founder of the Scioto Country Club, a golf club in Columbus, Ohio.

=== Political prominence ===
In the spring of 1918, banker Bernard Baruch was asked to reorganize the War Industries Board during World War I, and placed several prominent businessmen in key posts. Bush became chief of the Ordnance, Small Arms, and Ammunition Section, with national responsibility for government assistance to and relations with munitions companies.

Bush served on the board of the Federal Reserve Bank of Cleveland (as well as of the Huntington National Bank of Columbus). In 1931, he was appointed to Herbert Hoover's President's Committee for Unemployment Relief, chaired by Walter S. Gifford, then-president of AT&T. He was once recommended to serve on the board of the Reconstruction Finance Corporation, but Hoover did not feel he was sufficiently known nationally.

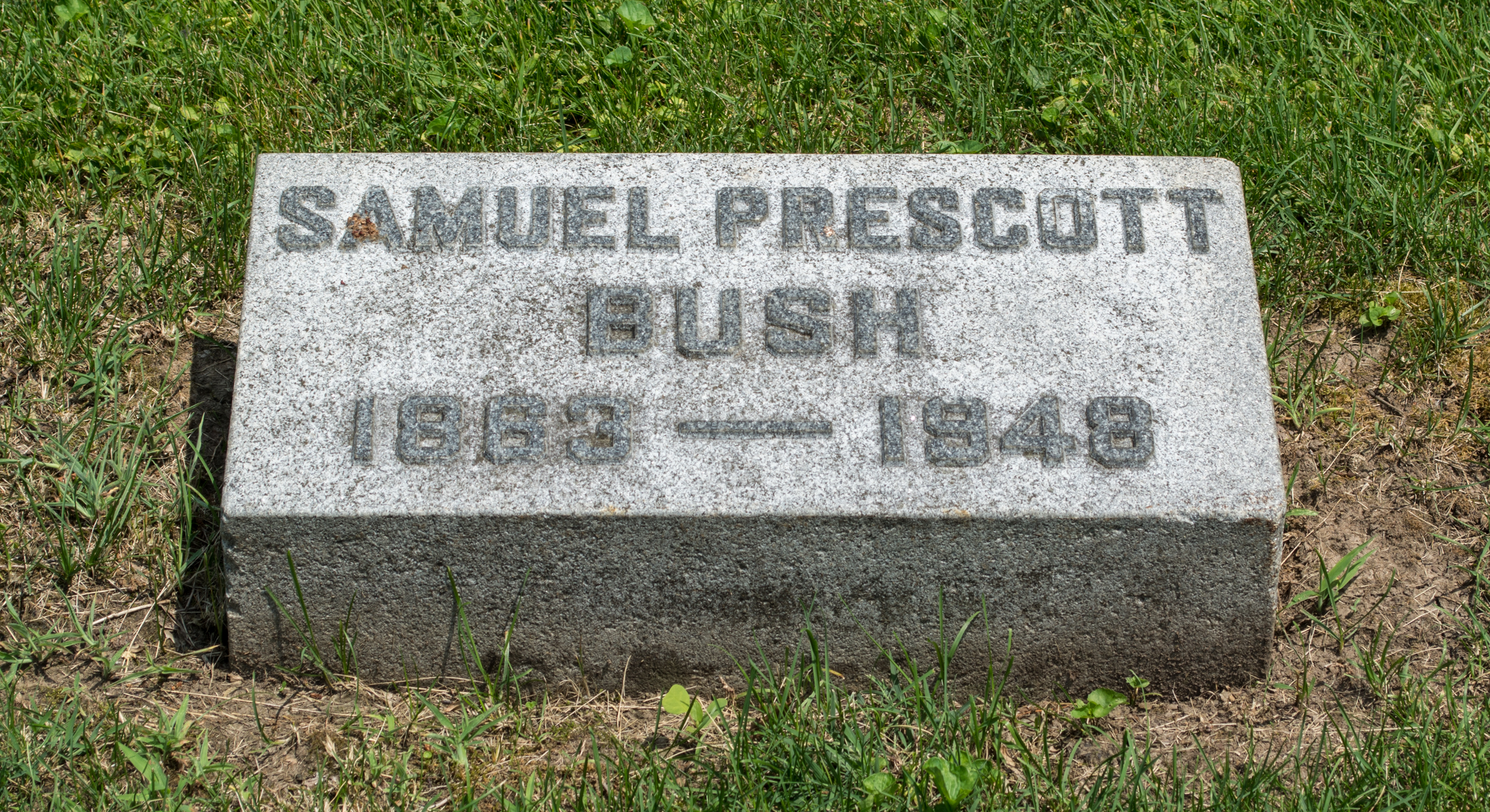
Headstone

== Personal life ==
On June 20, 1894, he married Flora Sheldon (1871–1920), the daughter of Robert Emmet Sheldon (1845–1915) and Mary Elizabeth Butler (1851–1897). Her maternal grandfather was Courtland Philip Livingston Butler (1813–1891), a member of the Livingston family. Together, they had five children:

- Prescott Sheldon Bush (1895–1972), a US Senator, who married Dorothy Walker (1901–1992), daughter of George Herbert Walker; he was the father of President George Herbert Walker Bush and grandfather of President George Walker Bush and former Florida governor Jeb Bush.
- Sheldon Robert Bush (January 1897–1900), who died in childhood.
- Mary Eleanor Bush House (December 1897–1992), who married Francis "Frank" House.
- Margaret Livingston Bush Clement (1899–1 June 1994), who married Stuart Holmes Clement (1897–1974) in 1917.
- James Smith Bush II (1901–1979), a director of the Export–Import Bank, and president of the Northwest International Bank.

His first wife, Flora, died prematurely young in 1920 at the age of 48-49 during a vacation in Rhode Island, when she was hit by a car (five years after the death of her own father, Robert Sheldon in 1915; who lived to 70 years of age and three years before her mother-in-law, Harriet's demise in 1923, aged 95 of which the latter outlived her by three years). He later remarried Martha Bell Carter (1879–1950) of Milwaukee, the widow of one Thomas Percy Carter (1868–1933).

Bush died on February 8, 1948, aged 84 (eight months shy of his 85th birthday), in Columbus. He is interred at Green Lawn Cemetery in Columbus.
