= Sharon Bush =

Ex-wife of Neil Bush

Sharon Murray
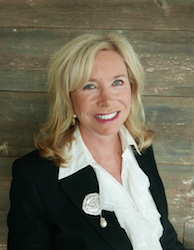
- Born: Sharon Smith; 19 May 1952 (age 74); New York City, U.S.
- Education: University of New Hampshire
- Occupation: Philanthropist
- Spouses: Neil Bush (m. 1980; div. 2003) Bob Murray (m. 2019)
- Children: 3; including Lauren

Sharon Murray (née Smith, formerly Bush; born May 19, 1952) is an American philanthropist who is the founder and CEO of Teddy Share, and the director of development for Cristo Rey Brooklyn High School. She is the former wife of businessman Neil Bush.

== Early life ==
She is a daughter of Alba M. Smith and Robert E. Smith, an engineer working on the federal government who lived in Nashua, New Hampshire. Sharon obtained her teaching degree from the University of New Hampshire in 1975.

== Career ==
Bush began her work as an elementary school teacher. She then started Karitas Foundation, a national non-profit supporting shelters for homeless and abused children.

In 1998, Bush founded Teddy Share, a for-profit company supporting charities focused on children's causes worldwide. In 2013, she began to oversee business development for Protein Matrix, a company that produces a biodegradable degreasing product that breaks down fat, oil and grease to prevent clogs, overflows and fire hazards.

In 2017, Bush took the role of director of development for Cristo Rey Brooklyn High School, a private Catholic school for children from low-income backgrounds.

== Personal life ==
Sharon Bush was married to Neil Bush (born January 22, 1955) from 1980 until April 2003. The couple have three children: Lauren Pierce Bush (born June 25, 1984), Pierce Mallon Bush (born March 15, 1986) and Ashley Walker Bush (born February 7, 1989). She has three grandsons and one granddaughter from her first marriage.

They were divorced in 2003, and on November 30, 2019, she married Bob Murray at Central Presbyterian Church in Manhattan. Murray is a former managing director of Morgan Stanley & Company and the chief financial officer of the Public Service Enterprise Group. Murray is the son of Thomas F. Murray, the former chief investment officer of the Equitable Life Assurance Society of the United States.

=== Awards ===
In 2001, Bush received the Outstanding Mother Award, awarded annually by the National Mother's Day Committee. In 2011, Bush received the Girl Scouts Women of Distinction award.
