= Caleb Lothrop House =

Historic house in Massachusetts, United States

- U.S. National Register of Historic Places
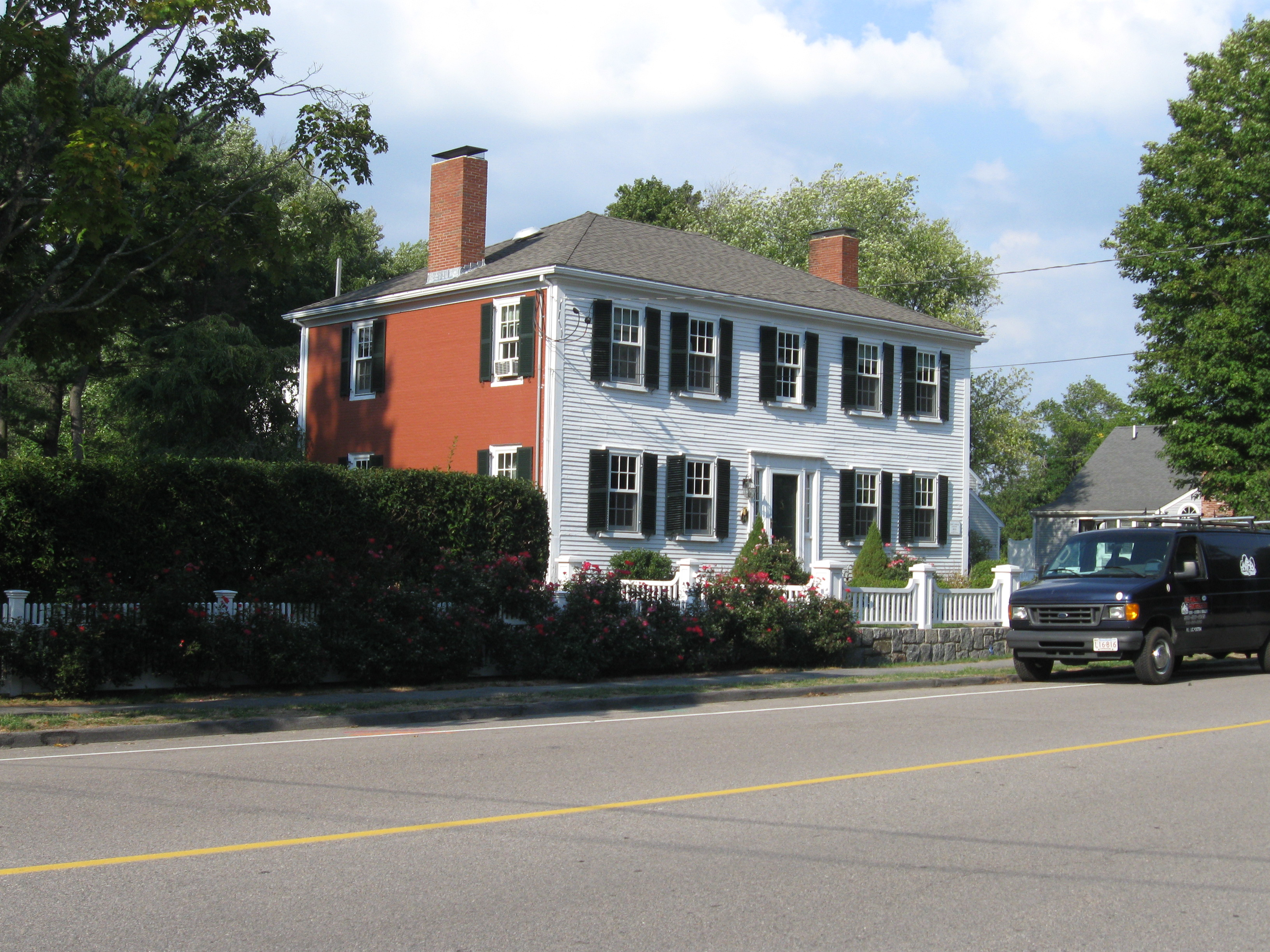

- Location within Massachusetts Location within the United States
- Location: 14 Summer Street, Cohasset, Massachusetts
- Coordinates: 42.2366°N 70.79695°W
- Built: 1821
- Architectural style: Federal
- NRHP reference No.: 76000269
- Added to NRHP: May 3, 1976

The Caleb Lothrop House is a historic house in Cohasset, Massachusetts. The two-story hip-roof wood-frame house was built in 1821, and is the only brick-ended houses in the town. The house is a well-preserved example of Federal styling, featuring a center entry that is flanked by sidelight windows and pilasters. The house served for a time as the headquarters of the Cohasset Historical Society. Calep Lothrop, its builder, was the grandson of a Revolutionary War militia leader, and was descended from one of the area's first settlers.

The house was listed on the National Register of Historic Places in 1976.

== See also ==
- National Register of Historic Places listings in Norfolk County, Massachusetts
