= Bobby Koch =

American lobbyist

- Born: Robert P. Koch; January 13, 1960 (age 66)
- Spouse: Dorothy Bush (m. 1992)
- Children: 2

Robert P. Koch (born January 13, 1960) is the president and CEO of the Wine Institute, acting as its chief lobbyist in Washington, D.C., and Sacramento, California.

== Early life ==
Koch is the son of George William Koch, past president of the Grocery Manufacturers Association.

== Personal life ==
In 1992, he married Dorothy Bush, George H. W. Bush's daughter, at a private ceremony held at Camp David—the only couple to have married there. They have two children, and Dorothy has two children from her first marriage.

== Career ==
Koch started his career in politics working for Tony Coelho and was part of his campaign to become House Majority Whip. Koch later became staff director for House Democratic Leader Richard Gephardt before joining the Wine Institute. Since becoming President and CEO in June 2003, membership has grown 70% to over 1,000 Californian wineries and affiliated businesses which are predominantly family owned. He has a substantial equity interest in the Central European Distribution Corporation, a company that manufactures and distributes vodka in Poland.

Koch is active in raising funds to find a cure for Crohn's disease and ulcerative colitis.
