= Joe Ellis =

Former American football administrator (born 1957)

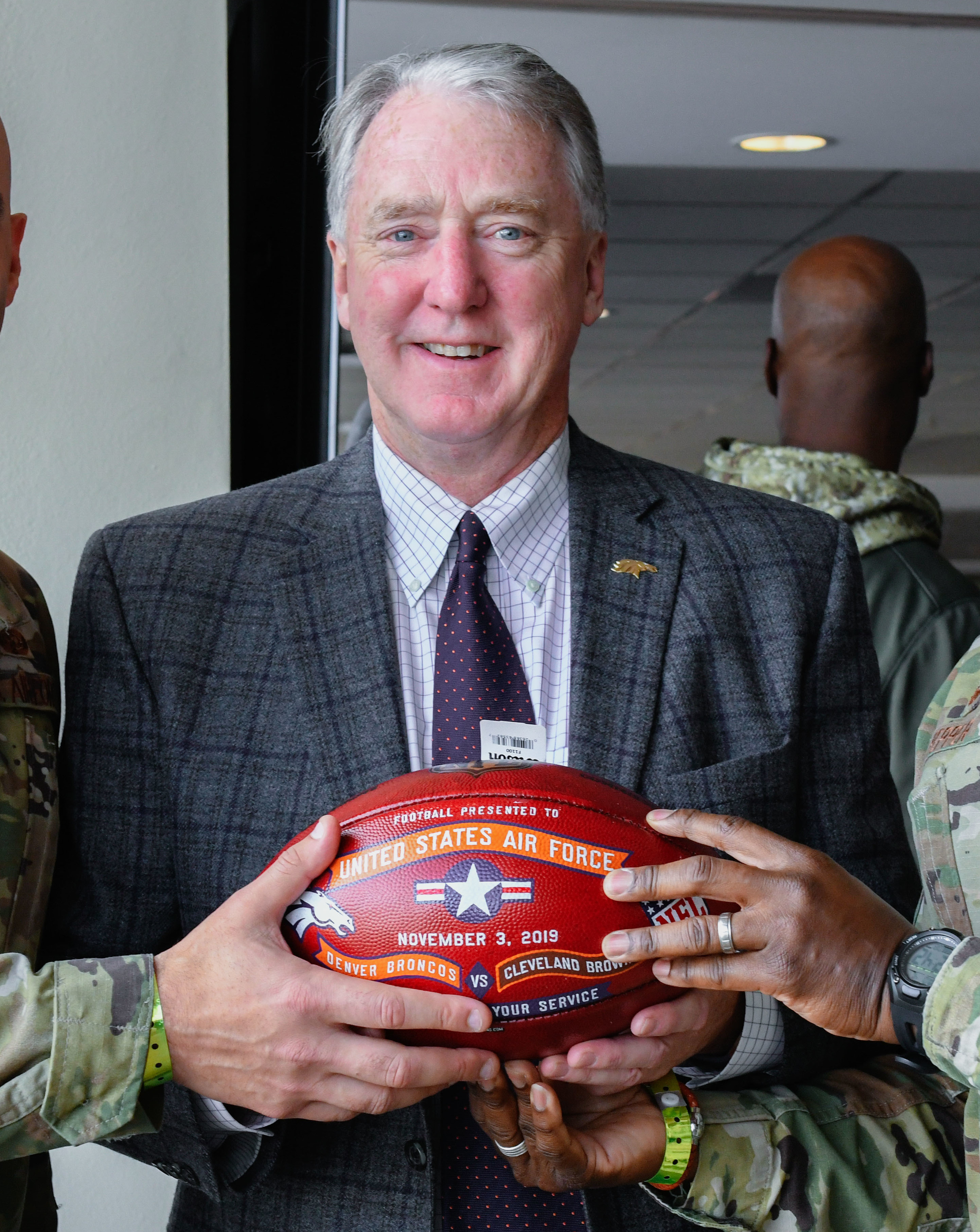
- Ellis in 2019

Personal information
- Born: November 16, 1957 (age 68); Colorado, U.S.

Career information
- College: Colorado College (B.A., 1980); Northwestern University (M.A., 1988)

Career history
- Denver Broncos (1983–1985) Director of marketing; National Football League (1990–1997) Vice president of club administration and stadium management; Denver Broncos (1998–2007) Executive vice president of business operations; Denver Broncos (2008–2010) COO; Denver Broncos (2011–2013) President; Denver Broncos (2014–2022) President/CEO

Awards and highlights
- 2× Super Bowl champion (XXXIII, 50)
- Executive profile at Pro Football Reference

Josiah Wear Ellis (born November 16, 1957) is an American former football executive who was the president and CEO of the Denver Broncos of the National Football League (NFL). He is the nephew of former US president George H. W. Bush and first cousin to former president George W. Bush.

== College ==
Ellis received his bachelor's degree from Colorado College in 1980. He attended graduate school at the L. Kellogg School of Management at Northwestern University to obtain his Master's Degree. Joe graduated from Northwestern in 1988.

== Career ==
Ellis began his career in the NFL with the Denver Broncos as their director of marketing from 1983 to 1985. After obtaining his master's degree, he served the league as vice president of club administration and stadium management until rejoining the Broncos in 1998 as their executive vice president of business operations. Joe acted in this capacity for 10 years. In 2008, Joe became the team's chief operating officer. He maintained this position for three seasons, until January 5, 2011. After 13 years with the organization, he was promoted to team president.

After owner and previous president Pat Bowlen was diagnosed with Alzheimer's disease, Ellis took control of the team. In August 2022, Ellis stepped down from his position after the Walton Penner group was approved as the new owners of the Broncos.

== Personal life ==
Ellis lives in Colorado, with his wife, Ann. They have three children: two sons, Si and Zander, and a daughter, Catherine. He is also a member of the Bush family through his mother Nancy Walker Bush Ellis, respectively making him the nephew of former U.S. president George H. W. Bush and cousin of former U.S. president George W. Bush.

== Awards and honors ==
- Two-time Super Bowl champion (XXXIII, 50) - as an executive with the Denver Broncos
- Inducted into the Denver and Colorado Tourism Hall of Fame in 2017
