= Ignite! =

American educational software company

Ignite! Learning, Inc. is an educational software and hardware company co-founded in 1999 by Texas businessman Neil Bush and a year later Ken Leonard. Neil is a brother of Former president George W. Bush and Former Florida governor Jeb Bush, and son of former president George Herbert Walker Bush. Alan Davis resigned as the president and CEO in November, 2009. Ken Leonard is the current acting CEO.

Ignite! Learning offers middle school curricula in social studies, science, and mathematics. The company's instructional design is based on constructivism, differentiated instruction, and Howard Gardner's writing on multiple intelligences to appeal to multiple learning styles.

== Finances ==
To fund Ignite!, Neil Bush and others raised $23 million from U.S. investors, including his parents, Barbara Bush and George H. W. Bush, as well as businessmen from Taiwan, Japan, Kuwait, the British Virgin Islands and the United Arab Emirates, according to documents filed with the Securities and Exchange Commission. As of 2006, at least $2 million had come from Taiwanese interests that had given Neil Bush a job consulting for a semiconductor manufacturer, and at least $3 million came from Saudi interests. A foundation linked to Reverend Sun Myung Moon donated $1 million for a research project by the company in Washington, D.C.-area schools.

In 2002, Ignite! entered into a partnership with a Mexican company, Grupo Carso to outsource many software and product development functions. Regarding the deal, Ignite! President (then CFO) Ken Leonard stated, "That's turned out to be great." Ignite! laid off 42% of its in-house workforce (21 individuals) in preparation for the partnership. Leonard said that outsourcing production will give it the resources to develop additional course software more quickly, and that the company wants to develop an entire middle school curriculum featuring the basics of language arts, math and science.

Deceased Russian billionaire expatriate Boris Berezovsky had been an investor in Bush's Ignite! program since at least 2003.

In December 2003, a Washington Post Style article said that Ignite! was paying Neil Bush a salary of $180,000 per year.

== Sales ==
In March 2006, Leonard said that in the past six to eight months, the company had hired national sales representatives across the country — in Florida, New York, Pennsylvania, Georgia and Nevada — in order to significantly expand beyond Texas. He also said that about 80 percent of the company's customers were from Texas as of that date.

One of the company's products, Curriculum on Wheels (COW), a purple multimedia machine on wheels that offers interactive video presentations on a variety of topics in social studies and science, was first produced in 2005.

According to the Ignite! Learning website, three different COW models are available: Science, Social Studies, and a "SuperCOW" that contains both curricula. Although specific pricing for each model has not been published by the firm, some COWS are reported to cost about $3,800 each. An annual maintenance fee of about $1,000 each has also been reported for some COWS.

The company has sold 1,700 COWs since 2005 and expects 2006 revenue of $5 million.

As of October 2006, over 13 U.S. school districts (out of over 14,000 school districts nationwide) have used federal funds made available through the No Child Left Behind Act of 2001 in order to buy Ignite's products at $3,800 apiece.

Another company product is a library of 9 educational science DVDs called "Squibs".

In July, 2008 Ignite! released ION, a network-based system. At this time the company claimed to provide middle school curriculum to more than 250 school districts, 10,000 classrooms, and 300,000 students.

== Effectiveness of learning programs ==
In 2009, Ignite! Math was a finalist for an Association of Educational Publishers Curriculum Award.

The Winter 2008-2009 issue of The Journal of Research on Technology and Education, a peer-reviewed juried academic journal, included a study on the effectiveness of Ignite!'s Early American History course and found a statistically significant improvement in achievement.

Salon magazine, on April 12, 2002 reported that Ignite!'s product is not well known in the education industry field, but it does get some respectful reviews. "They're new entrants in the market," says Keith Kruger of the Consortium for School Networking, "but from what I know, it's a serious product based on some good research."

One reported success for the company is Mendez Middle School in Austin, Texas, a predominantly poor and Hispanic school. After three years of using the company's Early American History program, the principal of the school said in 2003 that the percentage who passed the Texas eighth-grade history increased from 50 to 87 percent.

In 2004, an HISD-funded external evaluation of Ignite Learning found that teachers gave an older version of the product generally positive marks. "Teachers also found it to be effective in improving student understanding of history, engaging students in the learning process, and to a lesser degree, helping students pass the (Texas Assessment of Knowledge and Skills)," the study said.

In August 2006, Alamo Junior High Principal Jeff Horner said he first saw COWs at a Texas Association of School Boards convention in Austin. "We're enthused with them so far. It's a very unique way to get curriculum across in an interactive way," Horner said.

== Promotional actions by Bush family ==
In 2002, then company president Neil Bush received a mixed response when he spoke of education while at Whitney High School (a school for gifted students in Cerritos, California). Among the points of his speech, he opined: "We create these prisonlike environments, then we take our hunter-warrior types and label them attention-deficit disordered and put them on drugs." (Bush has often advocated for less use of ritalin and other mind-altering drugs on children.) He added that: "Ignite! is designed to make learning fun for "hunter-warrior" kids who don't like reading."

In February 2004, the Houston school board agreed to accept $115,000 in charitable donations from businesses and individuals who specified the money be spent on Ignite's learning programs. The money came from the HISD Foundation, a philanthropic group that helps support the district. Neil Bush and Ignite! company officials helped solicit the donations for the foundation.

In early 2006, Ignite Learning announced that Barbara Bush had donated funds to the Bush-Clinton Katrina Fund (a charity established by former Presidents George Bush and Bill Clinton), with instructions that the money be used to purchase "COWs" ("Curriculum on Wheels") from Ignite! for several economically disadvantaged schools.

In March 2006, Barbara Bush visited Fleming Middle School in Houston. In August 2006, Neil Bush visited Alamo Junior High School, the 1,000th customer of Ignite! Learning.
