= Scioto Country Club =

Country club and golf course in Ohio, US

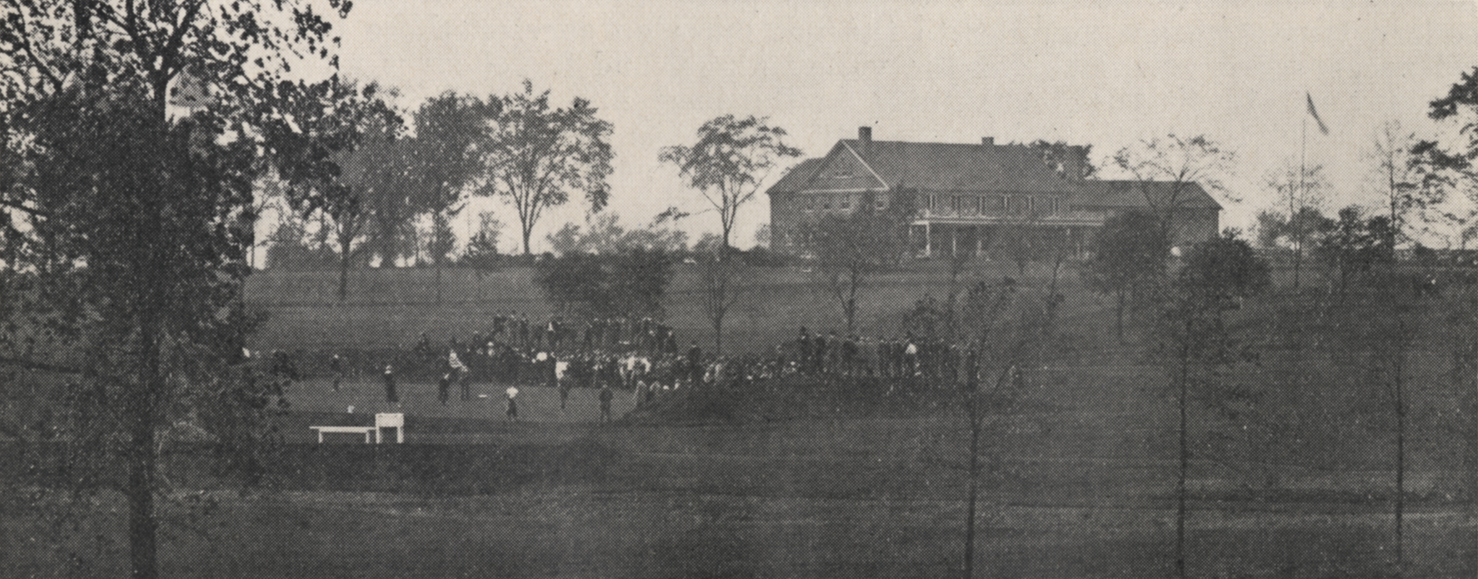
- Scioto in October 1918

- Location within the United States Location within Ohio
- 40.002°N 83.075°W

Club information
- Location: Upper Arlington, Ohio
- Elevation: 800 feet (240 m)
- Established: 1916, 110 years ago
- Type: Private
- Tota holes: 18
- Greens: Bentgrass
- Fairways: Bentgrass
- Website: sciotocc.com
- Designed by: Donald Ross
- Par: 70
- Length: 7,240 yards (6,620 m)
- Course rating: 75.5
- Slope rating: 145

Scioto Country Club, is a private country club and golf course in the central United States, located in Upper Arlington, Ohio, a suburb northwest of Columbus. It hosted the U.S. Senior Open in August 2016.

== History ==
Designed by Donald Ross, the golf course opened 110 years ago in 1916 and has hosted five PGA/USGA tournaments, including two majors. One of its co-founders was Samuel P. Bush, the paternal grandfather of President George H. W. Bush (and great-grandfather of President George W. Bush).

Scioto is one of only five courses to host the U.S. Open, the PGA Championship, the Ryder Cup, and the U.S. Amateur. The other four are Hazeltine, Oak Hill Country Club (east), Oakland Hills Country Club (south), and Pinehurst Resort (#2).

Jack Nicklaus learned to play the game at Scioto in the early 1950s, mentored by Jack Grout, and Bobby Jones won the second of his four U.S. Open titles there in 1926.

Its championship golf course was renovated in 2008 by Nicklaus and Michael Hurdzan. Over $6 million in improvements to its facilities are underway, and it was announced on April 17, 2012 that the course would host the 2016 U.S. Senior Open.

From the championship tees, Scioto is par 70 at 7,140 yards (6,529 m); the rating is 75.4 and the slope is 140.

== Course layout ==
| Tee | Rating/Slope | 1 | 2 | 3 | 4 | 5 | 6 | 7 | 8 | 9 | Out | 10 | 11 | 12 | 13 | 14 | 15 | 16 | 17 | 18 | In | Total |
| Championship | 75.5 / 145 | 455 | 460 | 390 | 210 | 465 | 565 | 395 | 510 | 160 | 3,610 | 420 | 395 | 550 | 470 | 255 | 445 | 435 | 175 | 485 | 3,630 | 7,240 |
| Par | | 4 | 4 | 4 | 3 | 4 | 5 | 4 | 4 | 3 | 35 | 4 | 4 | 5 | 4 | 3 | 4 | 4 | 3 | 4 | 35 | 70 |
| Black | 74.2 / 142 | 420 | 450 | 390 | 195 | 465 | 555 | 390 | 505 | 160 | 3,530 | 410 | 375 | 545 | 440 | 230 | 420 | 425 | 150 | 450 | 3,445 | 6,975 |
| Blue | 72.4 / 126 | 410 | 420 | 370 | 180 | 425 | 490 | 365 | 485 | 150 | 3,295 | 400 | 350 | 505 | 420 | 200 | 380 | 405 | 140 | 425 | 3,225 | 6,520 |
| Par | | 4 | 4 | 4 | 3 | 4 | 5 | 4 | 5 | 3 | 36 | 4 | 4 | 5 | 4 | 3 | 4 | 4 | 3 | 4 | 35 | 71 |
| White | M:70.5 / 133 W:76.3 / 140 | 385 | 410 | 350 | 165 | 410 | 445 | 350 | 450 | 140 | 3,105 | 380 | 320 | 480 | 380 | 175 | 370 | 395 | 135 | 415 | 3,050 | 6,155 |
| Gold | M:68.6 / 130 W:74.4 / 135 | 365 | 390 | 325 | 160 | 370 | 440 | 335 | 445 | 135 | 2,965 | 365 | 305 | 470 | 335 | 165 | 315 | 370 | 125 | 400 | 2,850 | 5,815 |
| Silver | M:66.6 / 126 W:71.9 / 134 | 335 | 385 | 290 | 155 | 350 | 415 | 275 | 415 | 130 | 2,750 | 315 | 300 | 440 | 330 | 130 | 310 | 345 | 105 | 395 | 2,670 | 5,420 |
| Green | M:65.1 / 124 W:70.4 / 129 | 300 | 280 | 285 | 95 | 340 | 405 | 270 | 410 | 115 | 2,600 | 310 | 280 | 435 | 285 | 120 | 290 | 340 | 100 | 390 | 2,550 | 5,150 |
| Red | M:62.5 / 116 W:66.1 / 115 | 260 | 315 | 240 | 90 | 300 | 350 | 230 | 330 | 110 | 2,225 | 270 | 205 | 345 | 240 | 120 | 250 | 280 | 85 | 370 | 2,165 | 4,390 |
| Purple | M:60.1 / 111 W:61.9 / 104 | 210 | 230 | 185 | 80 | 250 | 300 | 210 | 280 | 110 | 1,855 | 210 | 190 | 270 | 220 | 85 | 240 | 240 | 85 | 280 | 1,815 | 3,670 |
| Yellow | M:58.2 / 107 W:59.1 / 100 | 170 | 185 | 150 | 70 | 200 | 240 | 180 | 230 | 110 | 1,535 | 180 | 160 | 230 | 200 | 65 | 200 | 190 | 85 | 200 | 1,510 | 3,045 |
| Par | Men's | 4 | 4 | 4 | 3 | 4 | 5 | 4 | 5 | 3 | 36 | 4 | 4 | 5 | 4 | 3 | 4 | 4 | 3 | 4 | 35 | 71 |
| Par | Women's | 4 | 5 | 4 | 3 | 4 | 5 | 4 | 5 | 3 | 37 | 4 | 4 | 5 | 4 | 3 | 4 | 4 | 3 | 5 | 36 | 73 |
| SI | Men's | 9 | 3 | 7 | 11 | 1 | 13 | 5 | 17 | 15 | | 6 | 14 | 16 | 2 | 12 | 10 | 8 | 18 | 4 |
| SI | Women's | 11 | 3 | 7 | 17 | 1 | 9 | 5 | 13 | 15 | | 4 | 12 | 10 | 14 | 16 | 6 | 2 | 18 | 8 |

2016 U.S. Senior Open

| Hole | Yards | Par | Hole | Yards | Par |
|---|---|---|---|---|---|
| 1 | 434 | 4 | 10 | 424 | 4 |
| 2 | 460 | 4 | 11 | 362 | 4 |
| 3 | 384 | 4 | 12 | 550 | 5 |
| 4 | 200 | 3 | 13 | 471 | 4 |
| 5 | 452 | 4 | 14 | 250 | 3 |
| 6 | 560 | 5 | 15 | 447 | 4 |
| 7 | 378 | 4 | 16 | 426 | 4 |
| 8 | 502 | 4 | 17 | 202 | 3 |
| 9 | 162 | 3 | 18 | 476 | 4 |
| Out | 3,532 | 35 | In | 3,608 | 35 |
| Source: | | | Total | 7,140 | 70 |

- The U.S. Senior Open in 1986 was played as a par-71 at 6,709 yards (6,135 m).

== Rankings ==
Scioto is consistently ranked as one of the best courses in the United States. Currently, Golf Week ranks Scioto as the 53rd best Classic Course in the United States . It was ranked #49 in 2005. Golf Digest has Scioto ranked 59th , while Golf Magazine lists it as the 43rd best course (ranked 42nd in 2005).

Golf Digest rated this 36th best out of "America's 100 Greatest Courses" for 1995-96, and 32nd best for 1997-98. The same publication rated it as the 4th "Best in State" course for 1995-96, and 3rd best for 1997-98. In the category of "Top 100 Courses in the U.S." it was selected 29th by Golf Magazine in 1995, 33rd in 1997, and 43rd in 1999. Golf Week rated it 38th among "America's 100 Best Classical Courses" for 1997, 45th in 1998, and 47th in 1999.

Scioto is also ranked the 6th best course in Ohio by Golf Digest for 2005-2006.

== Tournaments hosted ==
- 1926 U.S. Open – Bobby Jones (amateur)
- 1931 Ryder Cup – United States defeated Great Britain, 9–3
- 1950 PGA Championship – Chandler Harper
- 1968 U.S. Amateur – Bruce Fleisher
- 1986 U.S. Senior Open – Dale Douglass
- 2016 U.S. Senior Open – Gene Sauers
- 2026 U.S. Senior Open – Padraig Harrington
