= Alexander Ellis III =

American businessperson (born 1949)

- Born: January 1, 1949 (age 77)
- Education: Phillips Academy Andover; Colorado College; Yale University
- Occupations: Business Executive, Partner in venture capital firm Rockport Capital
- Parent(s): Alexander (Sandy) Ellis; Nancy Walker Bush Ellis
- Relatives: George H. W. Bush (uncle); George W. Bush and John Ellis "Jeb" Bush (cousins)

Alexander B. Ellis III (born January 1, 1949), formerly an executive with alternative energy companies, and now a partner in the venture-capital firm Rockport Capital Partners. He is a nephew of former president of the United States George H. W. Bush and a first cousin of former president George W. Bush and the former governor of Florida John Ellis "Jeb" Bush.

== Family background ==
Ellis's father was Alexander B. (Sandy) Ellis II, an insurance executive in Boston who studied at Yale University. Ellis II (1922–1989) was an executive with insurance firm Fairfield & Ellis (which merged into Corroon & Black, now a part of Willis Group Holdings). His mother is Nancy Walker Bush Ellis, a sister of former president George H. W. Bush. Both Ellis II and Bush were members of Skull and Bones at Yale.

== Education ==
Ellis grew up in Concord, Massachusetts and attended Phillips Academy Andover, he later went to Colorado College. He studied business at Yale University receiving a master's degree in business administration.

== Career ==
Early in his career Ellis went to work for US Senator Edward Brooke (R-MA) as a legislative assistant. While working for Senator Brooke among the issues he studied was the turmoil in the nation's energy supply caused by the change towards a more assertive pricing strategy by members of OPEC. Ellis entered the alternative energy sector upon leaving Brooke's office. Energy efficiency was his specialization. He was hired eventually by the furniture firm Knoll. Knoll was later acquired by Westinghouse. Ellis was recruited to Kenetech Corporation, one of the nation's foremost windpower development and turbine manufacturers. Kenetech obtained venture capital support and quickly achieved an important place in the industry. Subsequent to Kenetech and before joining RockPort, Ellis and a partner formed a company which developed two independent power plants. Since 1998 Alexander Ellis III has been a partner with the firm Rockport Capital Partners. He is chairman of Clean Diesel Technologies Inc.

=== Honors ===
- Member of the Board, George Bush Presidential Library Foundation
- Member of the Board, Cornell Lab of Ornithology
- Massachusetts Audubon Society, council member and member of the finance and administration committee.
