= John Lothropp =

English Anglican clergyman (1584–1653)

- Born: 20 December 1584; Etton, East Riding of Yorkshire, England
- Died: 8 November 1653 (aged 68); Barnstable, Massachusetts
- Other names: John Lothrop, John Lathrop
- Education: Queens' College, Cambridge
- Spouse(s): Hannah House, Ann Hammond
- Children: Jane, Anne, John, Barbara, Thomas, Samuel, Joseph, Benjamin, Elizabeth, Barnabas, Abigail, Bathsheba, John

Rev. John Lothropp (1584–1653) – or Lothrop, or Lathrop – was an English Anglican clergyman, who became a Congregationalist minister and emigrant to New England. He was among the first settlers of Barnstable, Massachusetts in 1639.

Lothropp was a strong proponent of the separation of church and state. This idea eventually became the mainstream view of people in the United States of America, because of the efforts of Lothropp and others. Lothropp influenced the culture of New England, and through that, upon the rest of the country. He has had many notable descendants, including at least six US presidents, as well as many other prominent governors, government leaders, leaders of The Church of Jesus Christ of Latter-day Saints, and businesspeople.

== Biography ==
=== Early life ===
Lothropp was born in Etton, East Riding of Yorkshire. He was baptised on 20 December 1584. He attended Queens' College, Cambridge, where he matriculated in 1601, graduated with a BA in 1605, and with an MA in 1609.

=== Ministry and incarceration ===
He was ordained in the Church of England and appointed curate of Egerton, Kent. In 1623 he renounced his orders and joined the Independents. Lothropp gained prominence in 1624, when he was called to replace Reverend Henry Jacob as the pastor of the 'First Independent Church' in London, a congregation of sixty members which met at Southwark. Church historians sometimes call this church the Jacob-Lathrop-Jessey (JLJ) Church, named for its first three pastors, Henry Jacob, John Lothropp and Henry Jessey.

They met in private to avoid the scrutiny of the Bishop of London, William Laud. Following the group's discovery on 22 April 1632 by officers of the king, forty-two of Lothropp's Independents were arrested; only eighteen escaped capture. The arrested were prosecuted for failure to take the Oath of Supremacy. Evidence gleaned by the historians Burrage and Kiffin and from the Jessey records indicate many were jailed in the Clink prison. As for Lothropp, the question is unresolved. English historian Samuel Rawson Gardiner, whose book Reports of Cases in the Courts of Star Chamber and High Commission, gives an account of the courtroom trial and cites information from the trial record that the convicted dissenters were to be divided up and sent to various prisons. Historian E. B. Huntington suggests Lothropp was incarcerated in either the Clink or Newgate Prison. Further, it may be that Lothropp actually served time in both prisons since it was customary to move prisoners from one prison to another due to space availability. In the end, the precise location of Lothropp's imprisonment is not confirmable from primary documentation.

While Lothropp was in prison, his wife Hannah House became ill and died. His six surviving children were, according to tradition, left to fend for themselves begging for bread on the streets of London. Friends, being unable to care for his children, brought them to the Bishop who had charge of Lothropp. After about a year, all were released on bail except Lothropp, who was deemed too dangerous to be set at liberty. The Bishop ultimately released him on bond in May 1634 with the understanding that he would immediately remove to the New World. Since he did not immediately leave for the New World, a court order was subsequently put out for him. Family tradition and other historical reflections indicate he then "escaped."

=== Emigration ===
Lothropp was told that he would be pardoned upon acceptance of terms to leave England permanently with his family along with as many of his congregation members as he could take who would not accept the authority of the Church of England. Lathropp accepted the terms of the offer and left for Plymouth, Massachusetts. With his group, he sailed on the Griffin and arrived in Boston on 18 September 1634. The record found on page 71 of Governor Winthrop's Journal, quotes John Lothropp, a freeman, rejoicing in finding a "church without a bishop ... and a state without a king." John Lothropp married Ann (surname unknown) (1616–1687).

Lothropp did not stay in Boston long. Within days, he and his group relocated to Scituate where they "joined in covenaunt together" along with nine others who preceded them to form the "church of Christ collected att Scituate." The Congregation at Scituate was not a success. Dissent on the issue of baptism as well as other unspecified grievances and the lack of good grazing land and fodder for their cattle caused the church in Scituate to split in 1638.

Lothropp petitioned Governor Thomas Prence in Plymouth for a "place for the transplanting of us, to the end that God might have more glory and wee more comfort." Thus as Otis says "Mr. Lothropp and a large company arrived in Barnstable, 11 October 1639 O.S., bringing with them the crops which they had raised in Scituate." There, within three years they had built homes for all the families and then Lothropp began construction on a larger, sturdier meeting house adjacent to Coggin's (or Cooper's) Pond, which was completed in 1644. This building, now part of the Sturgis Library in Barnstable, Massachusetts is one of John Lothropp's original homes and meeting houses, and is now also the oldest building housing a public library in the USA.

== Genealogy ==
Coat of Arms of John Lathropp

=== Children ===
Lothropp married Hannah House/Howse in England, on 10 October 1610. They had eight children:

1. Thomas Lothropp, baptised 21 February 1612/3 in Eastwell, Kent, England, by his grandfather Rev. John Howse, parson there. Record from Bishop's Transcript records at Canterbury.
2. Jane Lothropp, baptised 29 September 1614 in Egerton, Kent, England; married Mayflower passenger Samuel Fuller (1608–1683), son of Mayflower passenger Edward Fuller (1575–1621).
3. Anne Lothropp, baptised 12 May 1616 in Egerton, England; buried in Egerton 30 April 1617.
4. John Lothropp, baptised 22 February 1617/8 in Egerton, England
5. Barbara Lothropp, baptised 31 October 1619 in Egerton, England
6. Samuel Lothropp, born about 1621 in Egerton, England
7. Captain Joseph Lothropp, baptised 11 April 1624 in Eastwell, Kent, England
8. Benjamin Lothropp, born December 1626 in Eastwell, Kent, England

After Hannah's death, Lothropp married again, to Ann Hammond in 1635. They had five children:

9. Barnabas Lothropp, baptised 6 June 1636 in Scituate, Massachusetts
10. Unnamed daughter, buried 30 July 1638.
11. Abigail Lothropp, baptised 2 November 1639 in Barnstable, Massachusetts
12. Bathsheba Lothropp, baptised 27 February 1641/42 in Barnstable, MA
13. Elizabeth Lothropp, born about 1643
14. Captain John Lothropp, baptised 18 May 1645 in Barnstable, MA
15. Unnamed son, buried 25 January 1649/50 in Barnstable. Died immediately after birth.

=== Descendants ===
Lothropp's direct descendants in America and elsewhere number more than 80,000, including:

- Rev. John Lathrop (1740–1816), great-great-grandson; congregationalist Boston minister
- Rev. R.A. Torrey
- Rev. Robert P. Shuler
- Presidents of the United States:
  - Millard Fillmore
  - James A. Garfield
  - Ulysses S. Grant
  - Franklin D. Roosevelt
  - George H. W. Bush
  - George W. Bush
- Revolutionary War figure Benedict Arnold
- Early leaders of the Church of Jesus Christ of Latter-day Saints
  - Joseph Smith
  - Hyrum Smith
  - Wilford Woodruff
  - Oliver Cowdery
  - Parley P. Pratt
  - Orson Pratt
- State governors:
  - Jeb Bush
  - Thomas E. Dewey
  - Jon Huntsman Jr.
  - William W. Kitchin
  - Sarah Palin
  - George W. Romney
  - Mitt Romney
  - Jim Guy Tucker
- US Senator Adlai Stevenson III
- Secretary of State John Foster Dulles
- CIA Director Allen Welsh Dulles
- Joseph F. Smith, 6th President of the Church of Jesus Christ of Latter-day Saints
- Joseph Fielding Smith, 10th President of the Church of Jesus Christ of Latter-day Saints
- Ezra Taft Benson, U.S. Secretary of Agriculture and 13th President of the Church of Jesus Christ of Latter-day Saints
- Roman Catholic cardinal Avery Dulles
- Old West gunfighter and lawman Wild Bill Hickok
- Poet Henry Wadsworth Longfellow
- Educator, president of Yale University, and American diplomat Kingman Brewster Jr.
- Historian, College Administrator, and president of Harvard University, Catherine Drew Gilpin Faust
- Speaker of the United States House of Representatives Galusha A. Grow, father of the Homestead Act
- Historical, Asahel Lathrop Latter-day Saint Pioneer
- Artists Louis Comfort Tiffany and Georgia O'Keeffe
- Physician, author Benjamin Spock
- Jane Stanford, co-founder of Stanford University
- Author and doctor Oliver Wendell Holmes Sr. and his son, US Supreme Court Justice Oliver Wendell Holmes Jr.
- Novelist Michael MacConnell
- Financier and Pianist Connor Quinn
- Founder of Post Cereal Company C. W. Post
- Marjorie Merriweather Post, founder of General Foods
- Alfred Carl Fuller, founder of Fuller Brush Company
- Founder of University of Chicago Law School, Founder of the Harvard Law Review, and Royall Professor of Law at Harvard University Law School Joseph Henry Beale
- Financier John Pierpont Morgan
- The Allred family, including actor Corbin Allred and polygamist sect leaders and brothers Rulon C. Allred and Owen A. Allred
- Actresses Dina Merrill, Shirley Temple, Brooke Shields, Jordana Brewster, Sissy Spacek and Maggie Gyllenhaal
- Actors Clint Eastwood, Kevin Bacon and Jake Gyllenhaal
- Singers Nick Carter and Aaron Carter
- Serial killer Jeffrey Dahmer

=== Family tree ===
Family tree

Hannah House	John Lothropp
Thomas	Jane	Anne	John
Barbara	Samuel	Joseph	Benjamin
Elizabeth	Barnabas	Abigail	Bathsheba

Ann Hammond
{{{John}}}

== See also ==
- Barnstable, Massachusetts
- Congregationalism
- Plymouth Colony
- Lowthorp for a discussion of the origins and spelling variations of the name Lo-/Lathrop.

== Bibliography ==
- Huntington, Rev E. B., A.M. "A Genealogical Memoir of the Lo-Lathrop Family in this country embracing as far as known the descendants of The Rev. John Lothropp of Scituate and Barnstable, Mass., and Mark Lothrop of Salem and Bridgewater, Mass. the first generation of descendants of other names."; Ridgefield Ct. 1884.
- Price, Richard. John Lothropp: "A Puritan Biography And Genealogy". Salt Lake City, Utah, 1984.
- Otis, Amos. "Genealogical Notes of Barnstable Families". 1888.
- Holt, Helene Exiled : the story of John Lathrop, 1584–1653, a biographical novel 1987
