= Robert Coe (colonist) =

American colonial

Judge of oyer and terminer of York Shire, New York
- In office April 2, 1669 – July 2, 1669
- Appointed by: Richard Nicolls

High sheriff of Yorkshire, New York
- In office October 1669 – September 1671

Personal details
- Born: 1596 Thorpe Morieux, Suffolk, Kingdom of England
- Died: before 1690 Hempstead, Province of New York, British America
- Children: 4
- Occupation: public official
- Known for: Early settler of American colonies
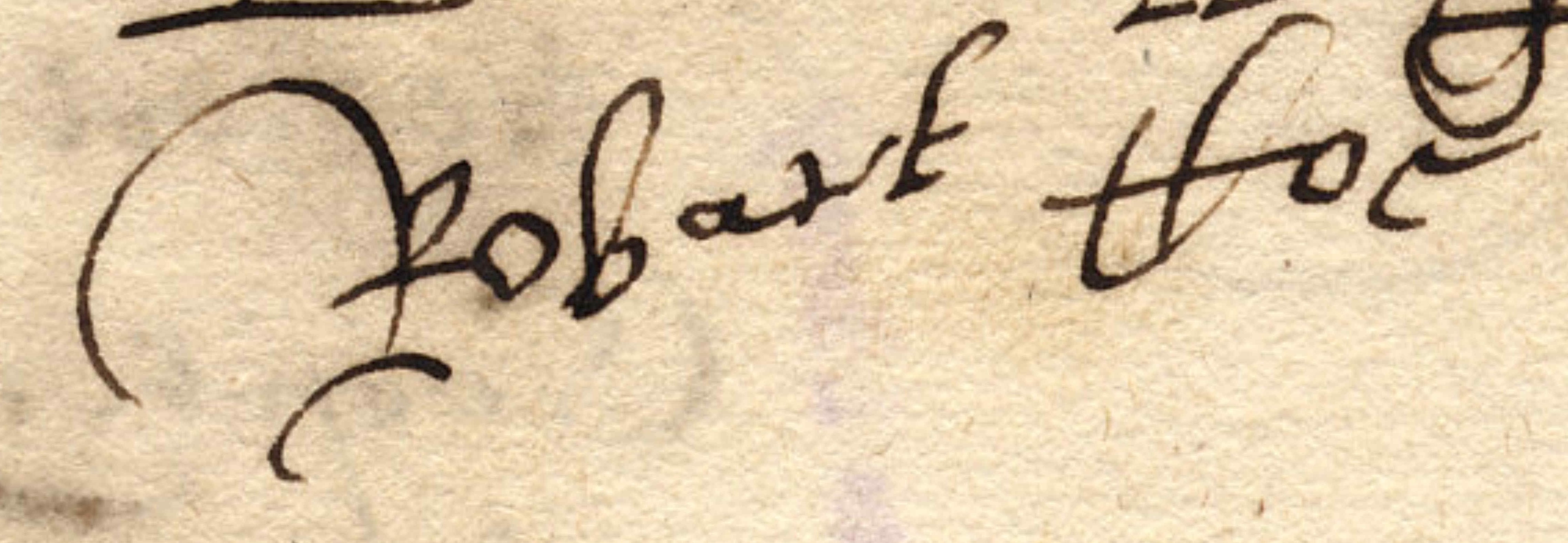
- Signature

Robert Coe (1596 – bef. 1690) was an early English settler, public official, and a founder of the New Haven Colony and five towns in Connecticut and New York: Wethersfield, Stamford, Hempstead, Elmhurst, and Jamaica. Coe took passage from England to the Americas in 1634 during the Puritan migration to New England. He is considered the founder of the Coe family in America and was the primary progenitor in New England of Coes. He has many notable descendants, including George W. Bush, British Prime Minister Winston Churchill, the screenwriter of Gone with the Wind, Sidney Howard, and the namesake of the largest state park in Northern California, Henry W. Coe State Park.

In England, Coe began his career as a public official with an election to the overseer of cloth. In the New Netherland settlements, he held appointed positions as a magistrate and a deputy of the General Court. Under the governance of the New England Colonies, he was appointed as commissioner of Jamaica, and the judge and high sheriff of Yorkshire, New York.

== Family history ==
Coe coat of arms

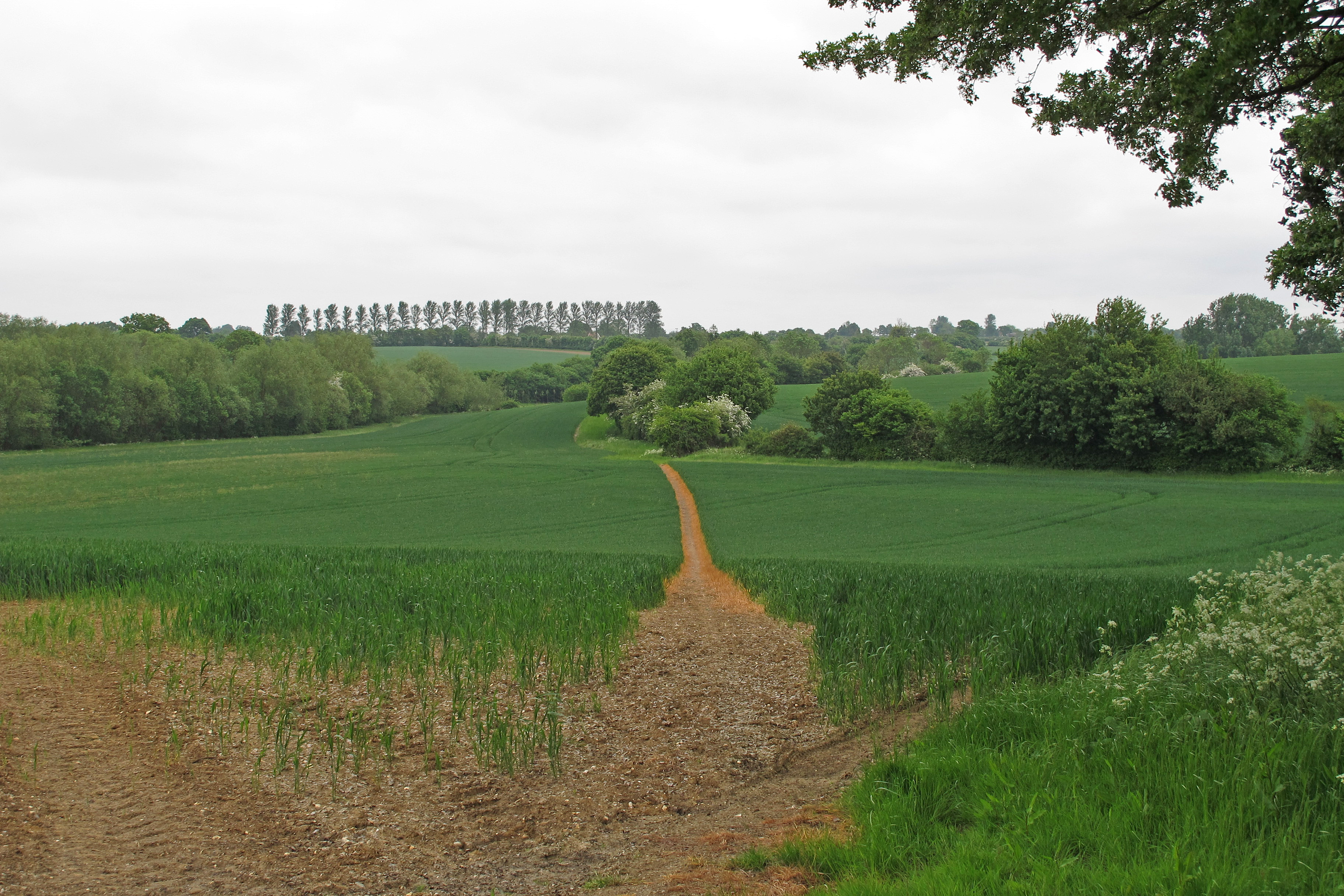
Footpath to Nether Hall, Gestingthorpe, owned by lord of the manor John Coo in the 17th century

The Coe family, originally recorded as "le Queu" and then "Coo", were Normans considered gentry and acquired their wealth through the cloth trade. The name was derived from Old Norse "ka" meaning jackdaw, which is also the meaning of Coe in Old English. The English heraldry of the Coe family uses the martlet, a small black bird like the jackdaw. The birds on his supplementary seals had legs, unlike the mythical martlet, more closely resembling the jackdaw. The first Coe was probably known as "the Jackdaw".

In the 14th century, John Coo, the earliest known historical direct ancestor of Coe, served with John Hawkwood in the White Company. He was awarded the title of knight by Edward III of England for the Battle of San Gallo in 1364. He established the Hawkwood Chantries in Hedingham Castle in honor of Hawkwood. He is referred to as "Cocco" by Italian historians. Many of Coo's descendants resided at Hedingham, were educated at the Inner Temple, practiced law, held offices in England, and were extensive landowners. One Coo was listed as a justice of the peace in Essex, others became lords. Many were yeomen, gentlemen, and esquires. 17th century lord of the manor John Coo owned many lands, including at Hedingham.

== Biography ==
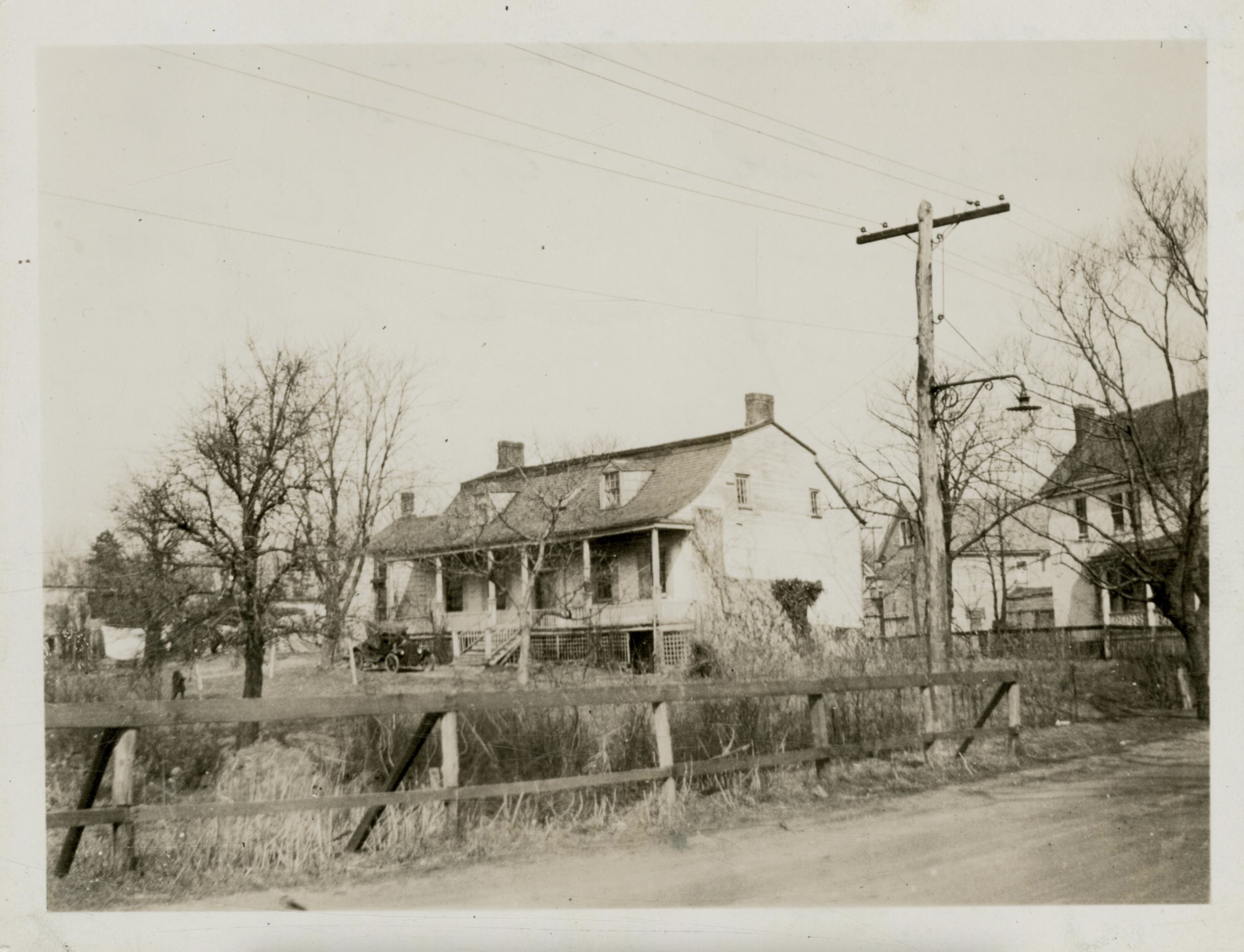
Coe's House in Jamaica, Queens, New York

Coe was born to Henry and Mary Coe (née Vincent) at Thorpe Morieux, Suffolk, England, and baptized there on October 26, 1596. He was described as a "fine example" of a Puritan and a "great force of character" by J. Gardner Bartlett, the American genealogist. His father had been a yeoman, probably a clothmaker, and for several years was churchwarden. He was burned at the stake for a shift in his religious beliefs.

In Boxford, Suffolk in April 1625, Coe was elected as the overseer of cloth and in 1629 as the questman of the church. His first wife and mother of his four children died in Boxford in 1628. He remarried shortly after. His only daughter, a twin to his middle son, died before 1634.

Historical records refer to him as "The Founder of the Coe Family in America". He and his family left for America on April 10, 1634 in search of religious liberty from Ipswich aboard the Francis, commanded by John Cutting. Coe settled for a year in Watertown, a Boston suburb in the Massachusetts Bay Colony, with several other Puritan families from Boxford who arrived with John Winthrop. He was made a Freeman, but soon left the area due to overcrowding with permission of the General Court.

Coe was a founder of two towns in the Connecticut Colony and a founder of the New Haven Colony. In June 1635, Coe joined Andrew Warde and a few others in starting a new plantation at Wethersfield (originally Pyquag), in the fertile Connecticut River Valley, where he lived for five years. A division within the church caused Coe, Warde, and eighteen others to form the Rippowam Company, with the intent of acquiring Rippowam lands from the New Haven Colony. The land had been previously purchased from the Siwanoy peoples. In 1640, Coe and Warde were designated by the general court as representatives in colonial government matters; they secured the land and founded a new plantation called Toquams, later renamed Stamford. Stamford was included in the creation of the United Colonies of New England. On April 5, 1643, Coe was appointed as Stamford's magistrate, the equivalent of a mayor. The following year, another dispute caused Coe and the town reverend, Richard Denton, to leave the British colonies in favor of the New Netherland settlements.

They crossed the Long Island Sound to what is now Long Island and founded Hempstead, where Coe was appointed the magistrate and the church elder. During his eight years leading Hempstead, he became an extensive landowner. In 1652, Coe and Edward Jessup became the majority landowners of a settlement west of Long Island in what is now Elmhurst. The town was originally called Middleburgh, then Hastings, and finally Newtown. Coe was made the town's magistrate and served for four years as a deputy of the general court, the same "representative" government style as in the British colonies. As the deputy, Coe traveled in 1653 to Boston and New Amsterdam to ask for protection against a threatened Native attack.

After the settlement was well-established, Coe relocated again in 1655 to Rustdorp, a town on a large tract of land south of Newtown, which he purchased along with his youngest son Benjamin and several others. Rustdorp was later renamed Jamaica. Peter Stuyvesant appointed Coe magistrate of the town under the jurisdiction of New Netherland, an office Coe held until 1664. When the English population on Long Island revolted against Dutch rule and transferred their allegiance to Connecticut, Coe was designated as commissioner for Jamaica under British auspices. After New Amsterdam surrendered to the English fleet, New York governor Richard Nicolls appointed Coe as the judge of oyer and terminer of Yorkshire. His final position was as high sheriff of Yorkshire until 1671, after which he retired from public office at the age of 75.

Near the end of his life, Coe settled his estate among his three sons. He married a third wife when he was over 80 years of age. He bought a farm of fifty acres at Foster's Meadow in Hempstead on November 29, 1678, where he lived until his death (which occurred sometime before 1690, when his will was executed). His estates in Connecticut and England in 1900 were valued at $308 million (around $10 billion in 2025). His home on Long Island stood until 1930, when it was demolished to accommodate the construction of the Long Island Expressway.

== Legacy ==
Coe landmarks and works
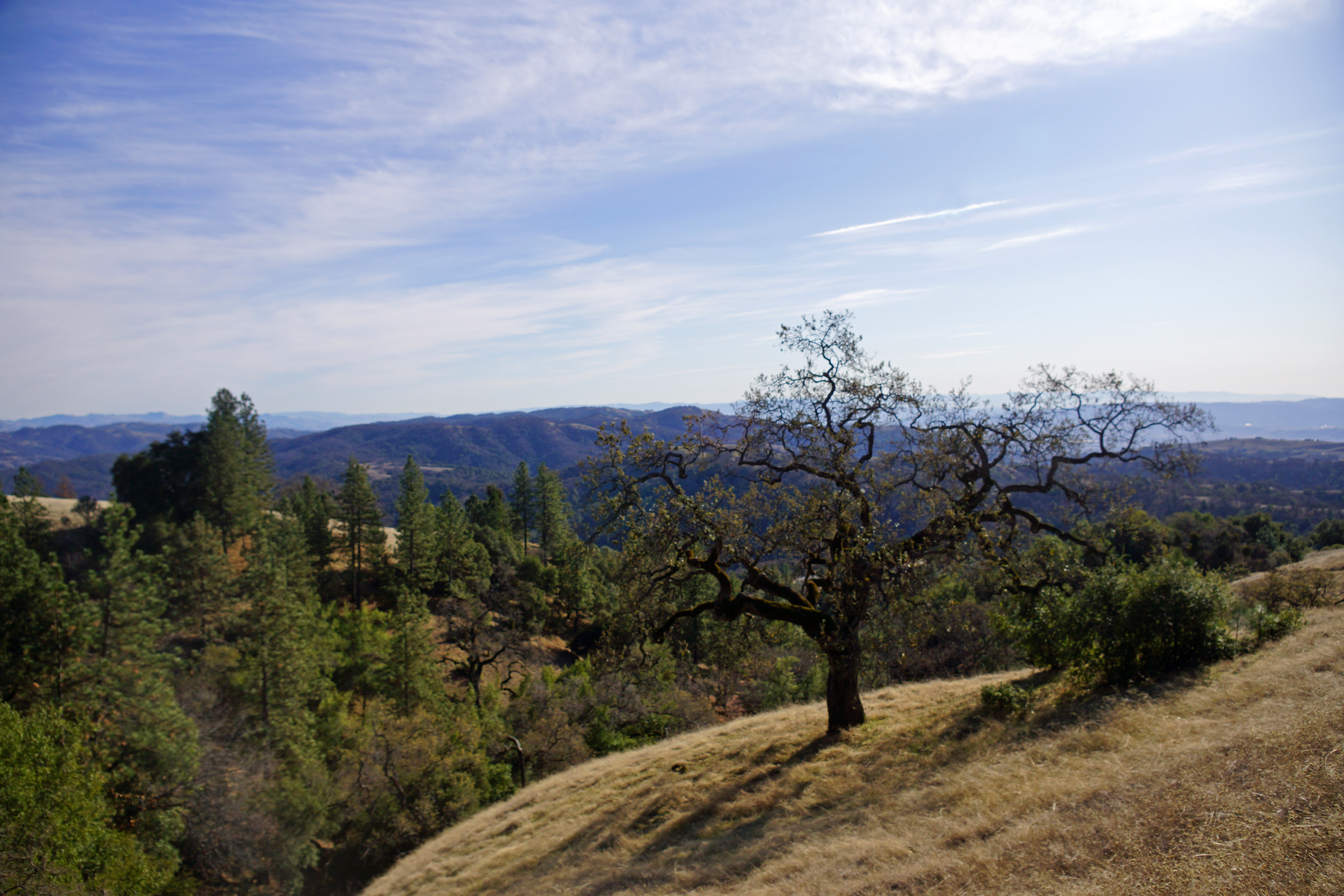
Henry W. Coe State Wilderness Park, in the Diablo Range, named after Henry Willard Coe Jr.

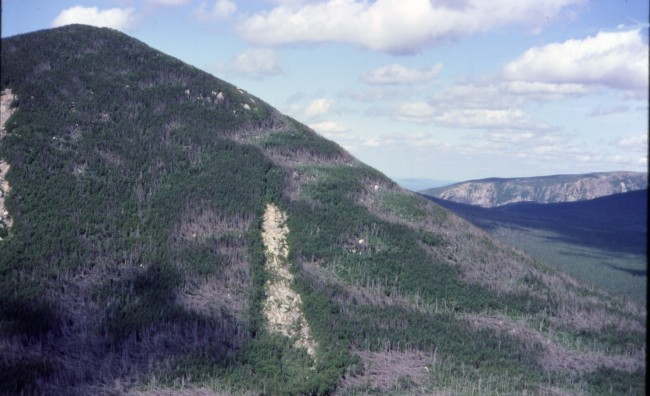
Coe Glacier in the Cascade Range is named after Henry C. Coe who platted the town of Hood River, Oregon

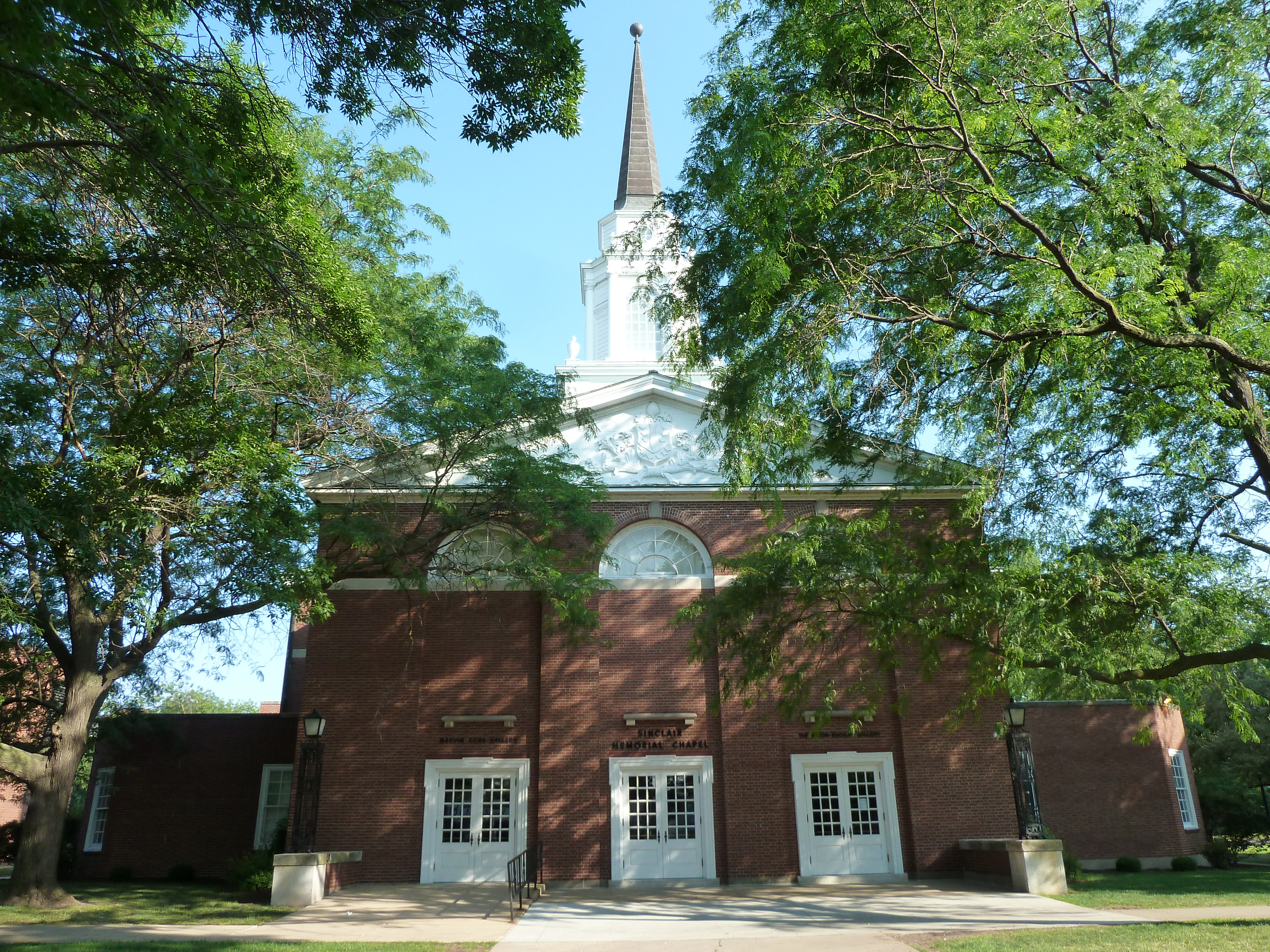
Coe College, Cedar Rapids, Iowa, named after Daniel Coe

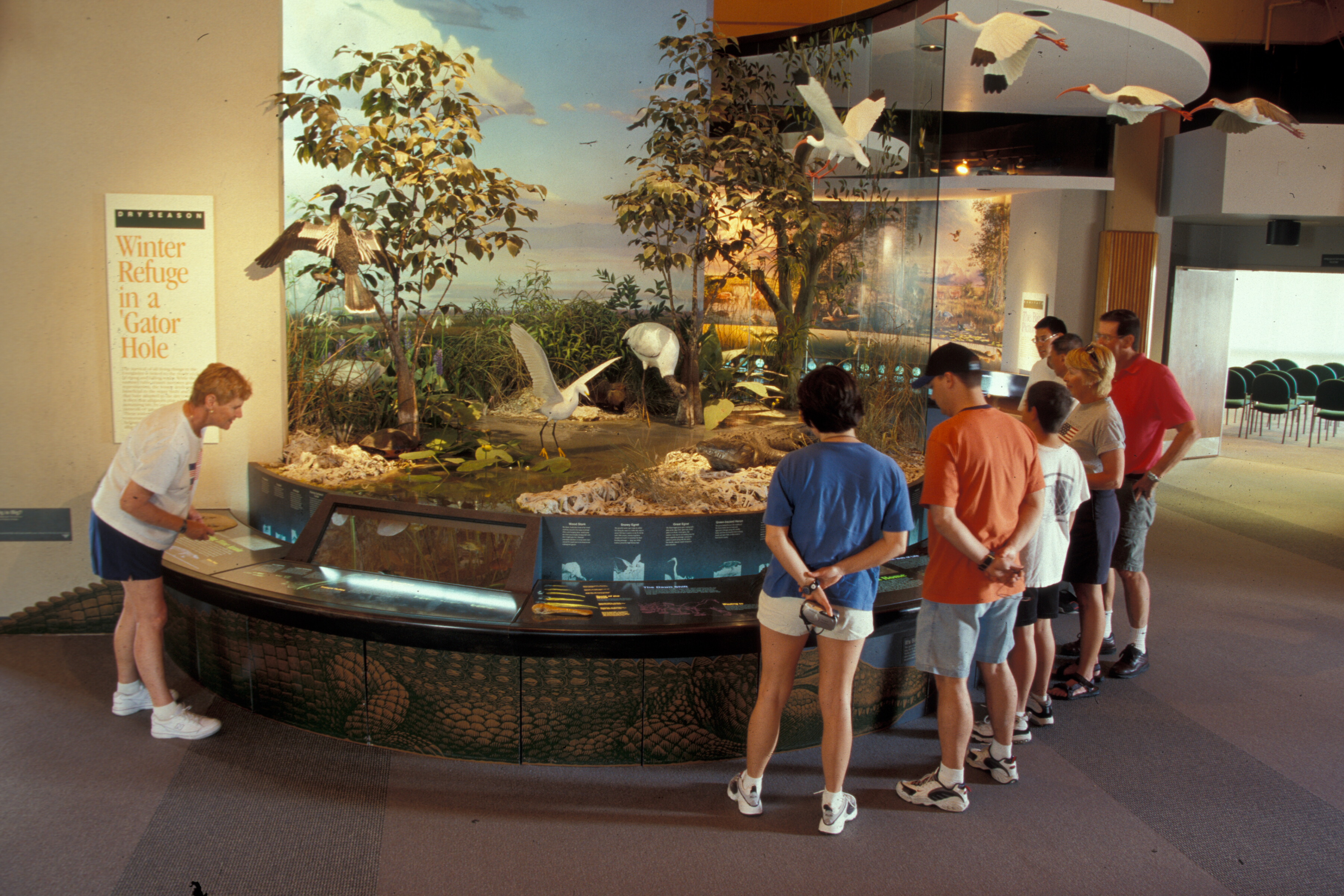
Ernest F. Coe visitor center at Everglades National Park

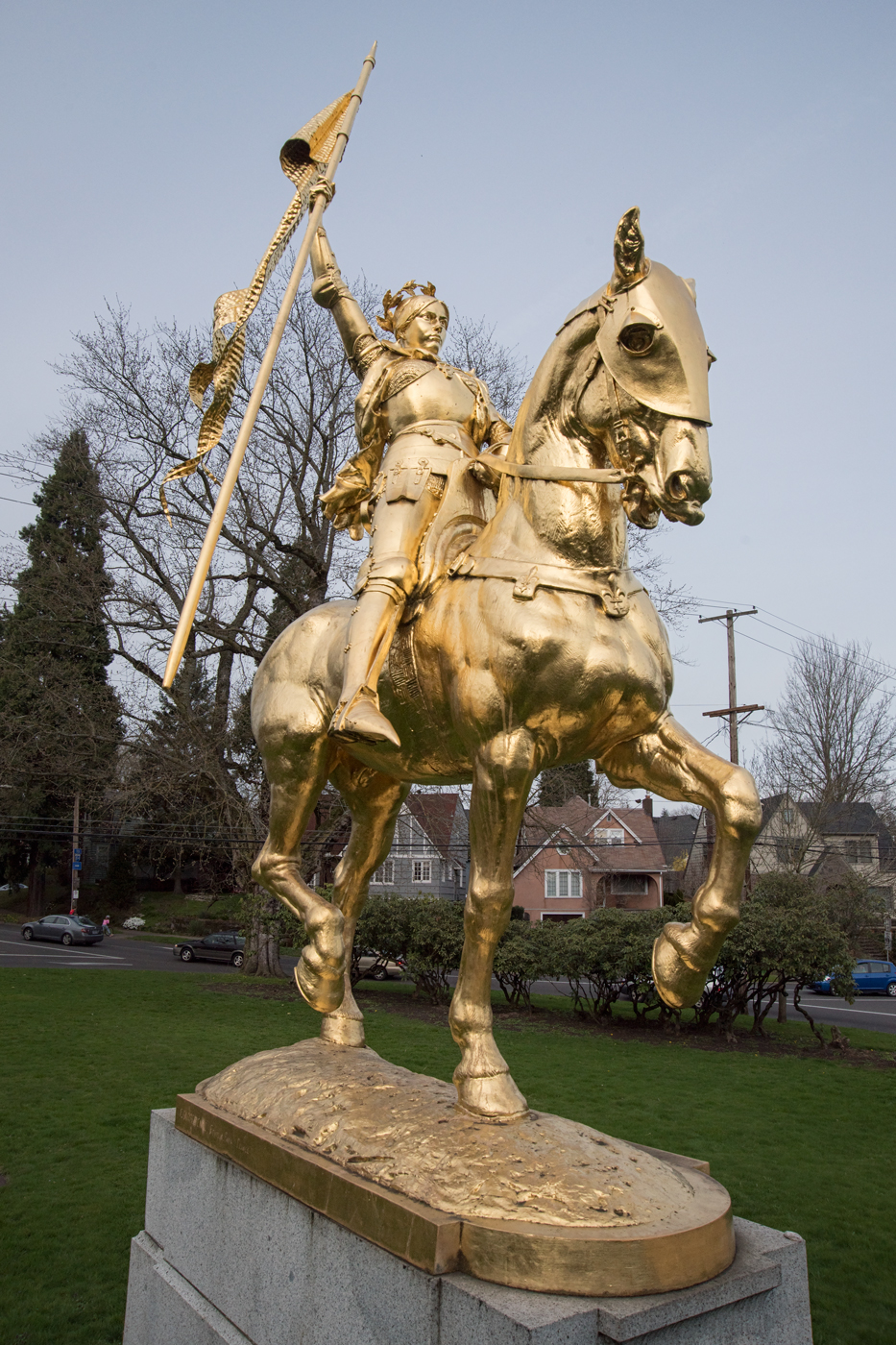
Joan of Arc statue at Coe Circle in Portland, Oregon commissioned by Henry Waldo Coe

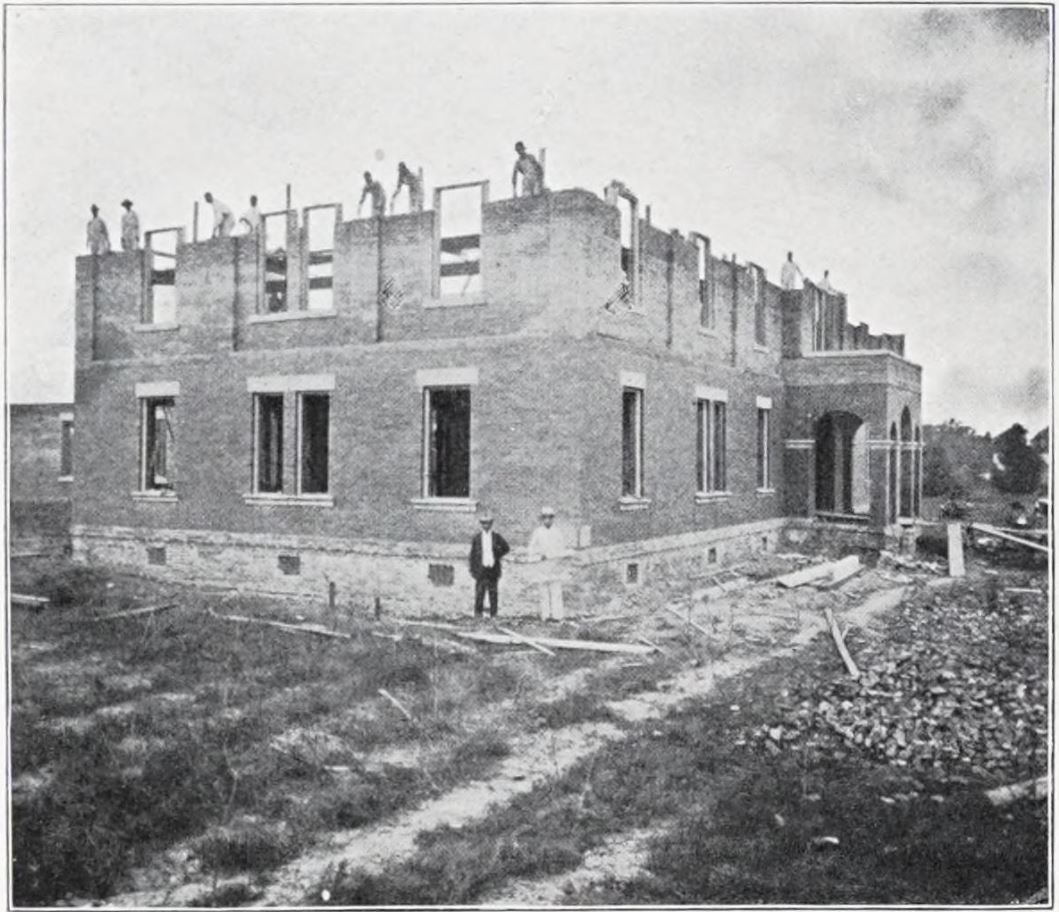
Coe Hall at Wiley University was named after Herman Gurnee Coe and his daughter, Isabel

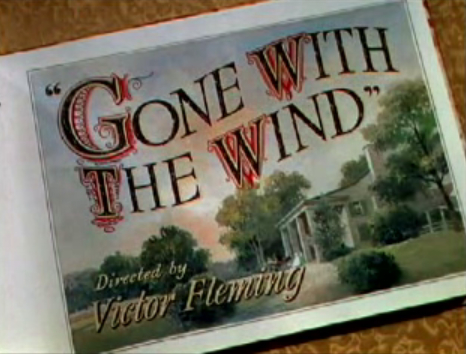
Gone with the Wind writer Sidney Coe Howard, for which he won an Oscar

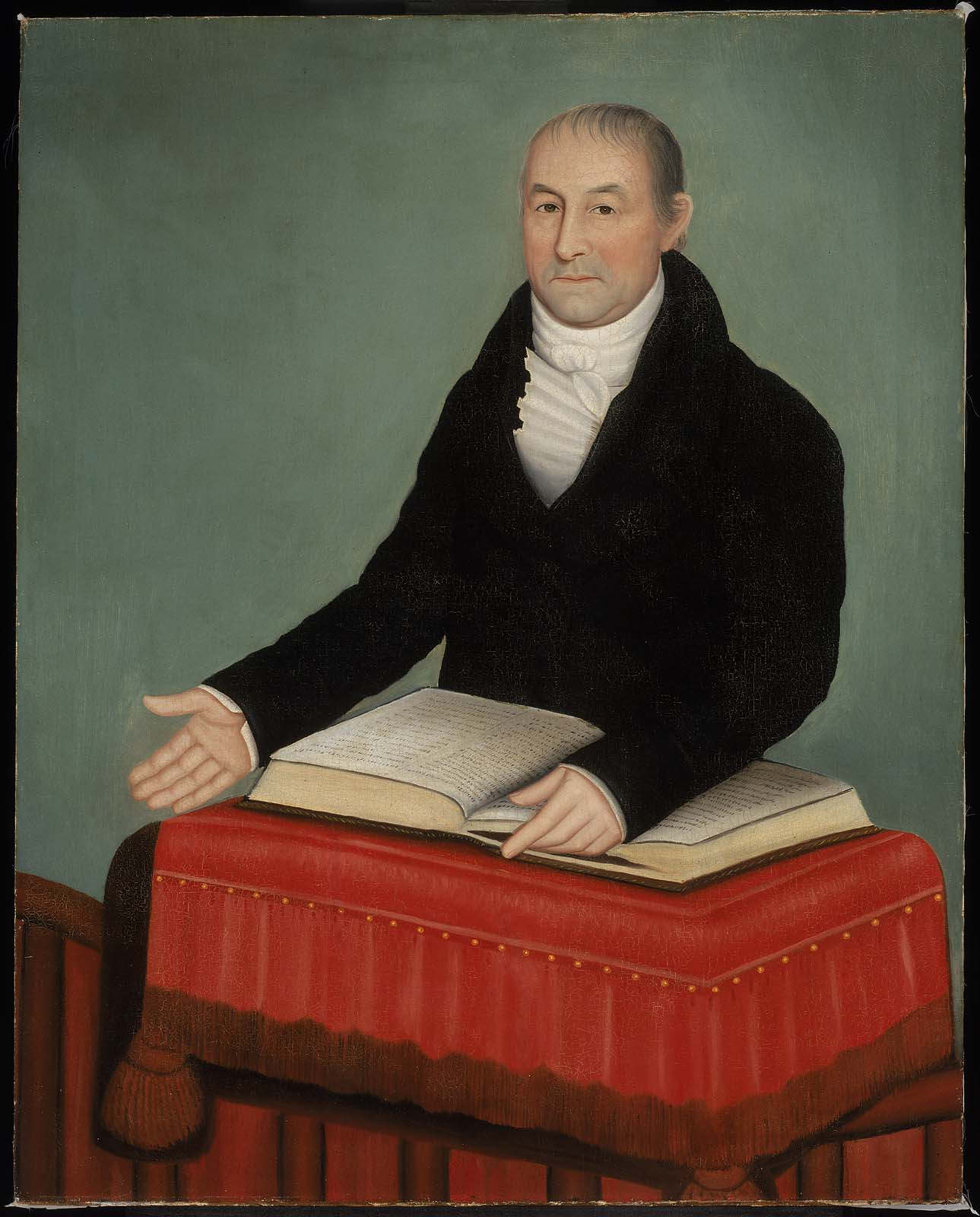
Jonas Coe, a George Washington guard who delivered the sermon at his memorial

The Bay View area of Freeport, New York, was originally named "Coe's Neck", after Coe, and remains the name of a local park. Cos Cob, Connecticut is named after Coe, derived from "Coe's Cob" meaning "Coe's wall".

Coe has many notable descendants and towns and important landmarks bearing the names of his descendants. Coe Township, Michigan is named after George Coe, Lieutenant Governor of Michigan and Coe Township, Rock Island County, Illinois is named after Albert S. Coe who served in the Illinois General Assembly and developed the area's agricultural industry. Coe, Indiana is named after one of the founders of Indianapolis and a frontier physician, Isaac Coe.

The namesake of Henry W. Coe State Park, the largest state park in Northern California and the second largest state park in the state and popular campground Coe Ranch, Henry Willard Coe Jr. The visitor center near Homestead, Florida of Everglades National Park is named after descendant Ernest F. Coe, who founded the park. Coe Glacier is named after Henry C. Coe, a naturalist and journalist who first ascended Mount Adams in the 19th century. He platted the town of Hood River, Oregon, which was settled by Nathaniel Coe, a pioneer politician and his father. They cultivated the Hood River Valley with fruit trees.

Coe College, is named after Daniel Coe, another descendant, and Coe Elementary School in Seattle is named after descendant Frantz Hunt Coe, though the original building burned down in 2001. Coe Circle, a park in Portland, Oregon, is named after descendant Henry Waldo Coe, where he commissioned the installation of a gilt bronze statue of Joan of Arc. Dudley Coe Hall at Bowdoin College, formerly the infirmary, is named after the son of Thomas Upham Coe, an alumnus, who was a prominent doctor and lumber baron of Bangor, Maine. Portraits of Thomas Upham Coe are in the Smithsonian Libraries and Archives and the Harvard Art Museums. Mount Coe is named after Ebenezer S. Coe, his father, who first surveyed western Maine and was an engineer and business partner of David Pingree. Coe Hall at Wiley University was named after Herman Gurnee Coe, the commissioner of Cedar County, Iowa, and his daughter, Isabel, who taught there.

Coe's second great-grandson, Jonas Coe, fought alongside George Washington in the American Revolutionary War. He served in the Commander-in-Chief's Guard in the Battle of Long Island and gave the military sermon upon Washington's death after having become a minister.

=== Notable descendants ===
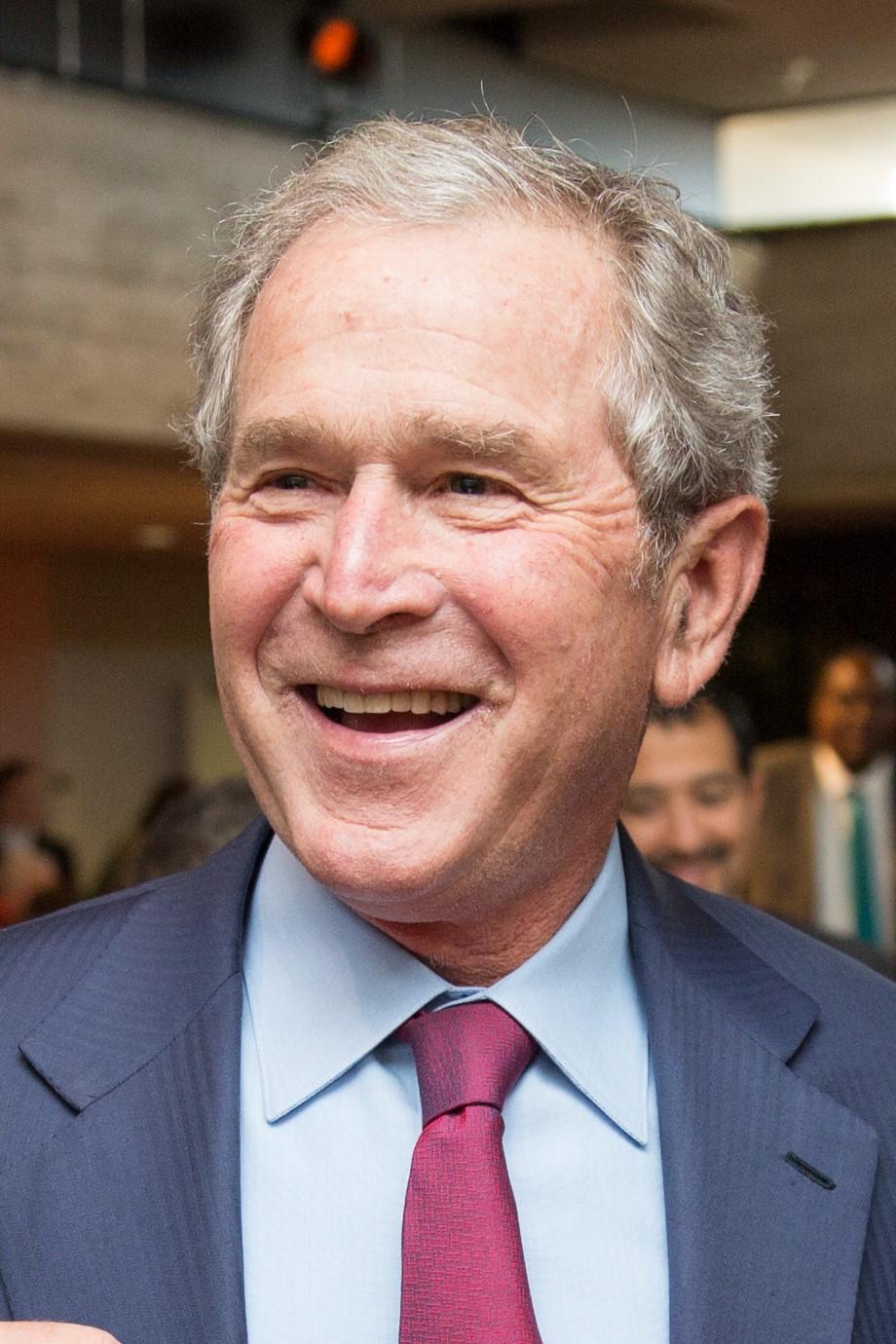
George W. Bush, American politician

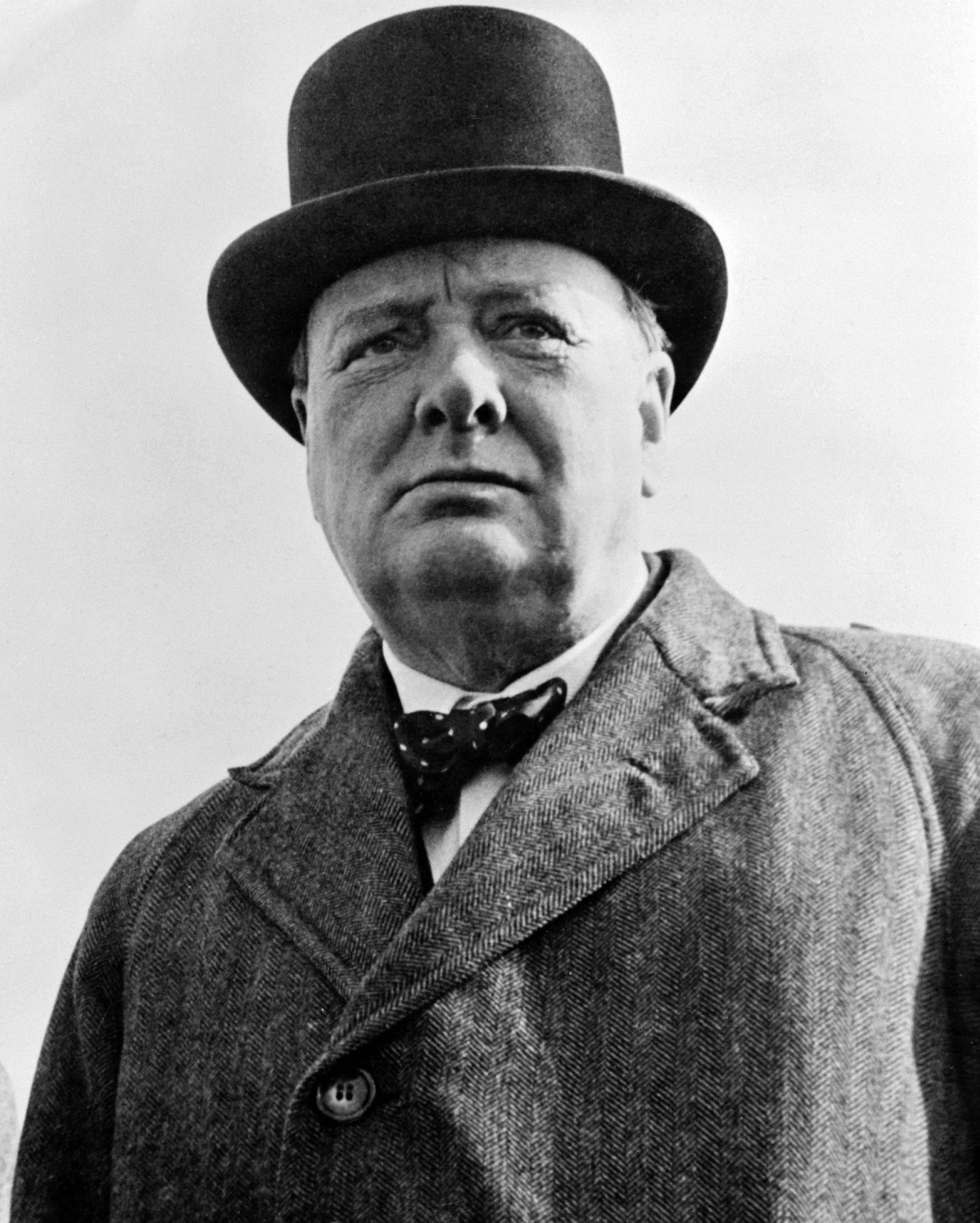
Winston Churchill, who was twice Prime minister of the United Kingdom

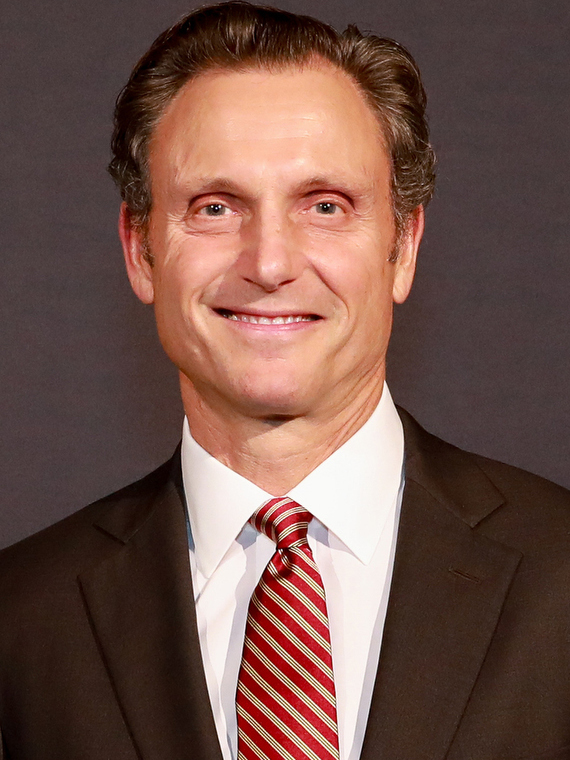
Tony Goldwyn, American actor known for Scandal

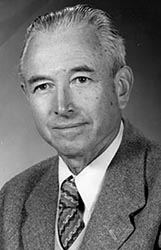
Richard F. Post, a recipient of the James Clerk Maxwell Prize for Plasma Physics

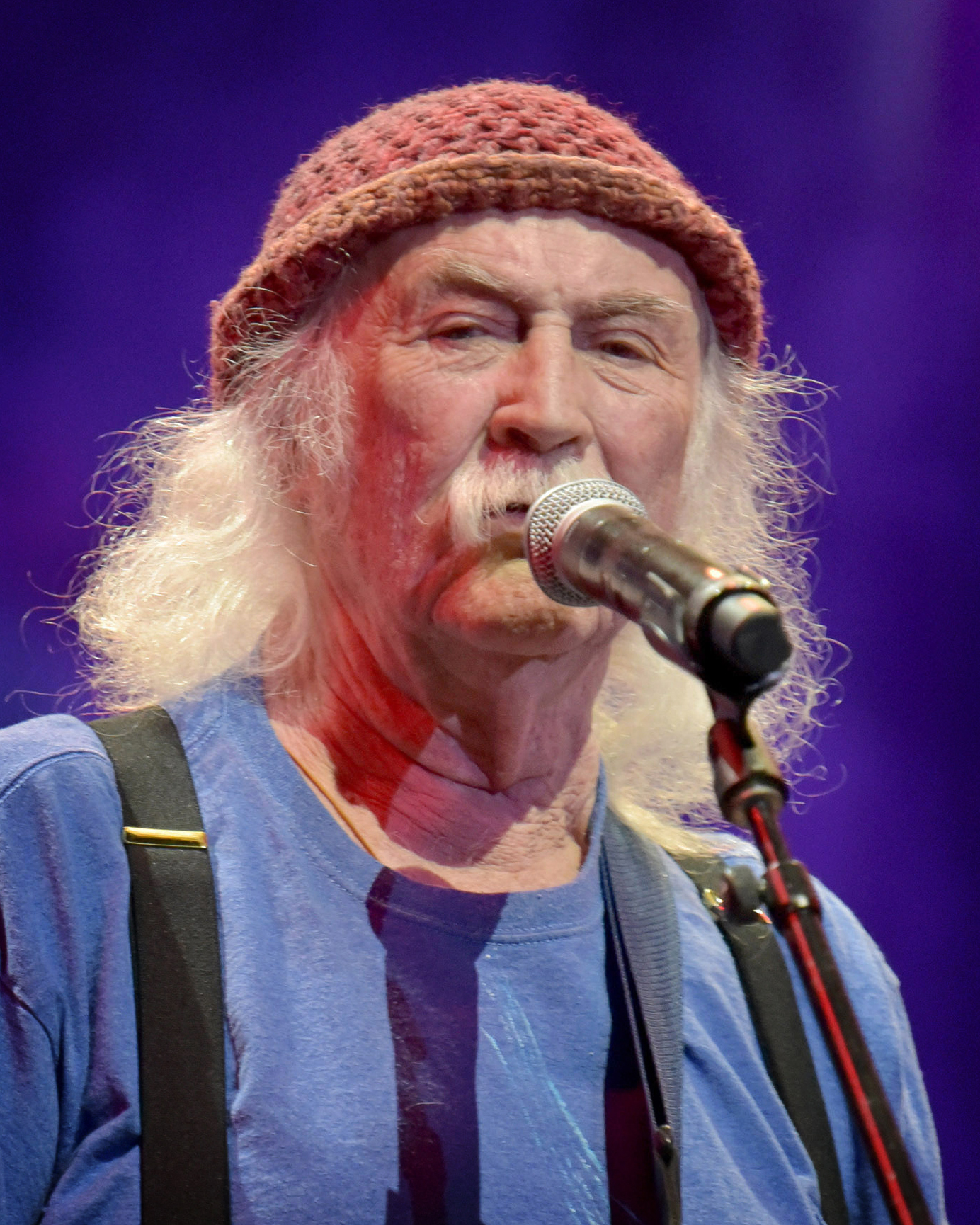
Crosby, Stills, Nash & Young singer and guitarist David Crosby

==== Tree of notable descendants ====
- Henry Coe (1555 — 1630), m. Mary Vincent
  - Robert Coe Sr. (1596 – 1690), m. Mary
    - John Coe Sr. (1625 — 1693)
      - John Coe Jr. (1657 — 1735)
      - Samuel Coe Sr. (1672 — 1742), m. Margaret Van Zandt
        - Samuel Coe Jr. (1718 — 1759), m. Phebe Seaman
          - William Coe (1748 — 1829), m. Martha Connelly
            - John Coe I (1784 — 1818), m. Polly Cooper
              - John Coe II (1814 — 1892), m. Katharine Hopper
                - John W. Coe III (1840 — 1889), m. Elizabeth Jackson
            - Dominy Coe (1795 – 1854), m. Nancy Stephens
              - George Coe (1838 – 1900), m. Martha Dickson
                - Elmer Coe (1874 – 1941), m. Lillie Musgrave
                  - Richard L. Coe (1914 – 1995), m. Christine Sadler
        - John Coe (1719 — 1782), m. Hannah Halstead
          - Jonas Coe (1759 — 1822), m. Elizabeth Miller
            - Eliza Coe (1803 — ), m. John Brown
              - John Crosby Brown (1838–1909), m. Mary Elizabeth Adams
                - William Adams Brown (1865–1943), Helen Gilman Noyes
                  - Winthrop G. Brown (1907 – 1987)
        - Daniel Coe (1730 — 1777), m. Sarah Palmer
          - John D. Coe (1755 — 1777), m. Sarah Coe
            - Hannah Coe (1784 — 1837), m. Halstead Gurnee
              - Walter S. Gurnee (1813 — 1903), m. Mary Coe
                - Augustus C. Gurnee (1855 — 1926)
            - Dolly Coe (1800 — 1887), m. Peter Post
              - Edwin Post (1821 — 1893), m. Mary Doolittle
                - Freeman Post (1875 — 1889), m. Miriam Colcord
                  - Richard F. Post (1918 — 2015), m. Marylee Armstrong
                    - Markie Post (1950 – 2021), m. Michael Ross
          - Matthew Coe (1757 — 1838), m. Martha Gurnee
            - Stephen Coe (1787 — 1838), m. Leah Henion
              - Matthew Coe (1815 — 1872), m. Susan Farwell
                - Frantz Hunt Coe (1856–1904), m. Carrie Everett
                  - Herbert E. Coe (1881 — 1968), m. Lucy Campbell
                  - Harry Coe (1885 – 1977)
            - Matthew D. Coe (1797 — 1881), m. Ruth Deyo
              - Herman Gurnee Coe (1826 — 1917), m. Katherine McClung
    - Robert Coe Jr. (1626 — 1659), m. Hannah Mitchell
      - John Coe Sr. (1658 — 1741), m. Mary Hawley
        - Robert Coe (1684 — 1762), m. Barbara Parmalee
          - Jonathan Coe (1710 — 1795), m. Elizabeth Elmer
            - Robert Coe (1740 — 1830), m. Chloe Thrall
              - Abijah Coe (1769 — 1852), m. Sibyl Baldwin
                - Israel Coe (1794 – 1891), m. Nancy Wetmore
                  - William Henry Coe (1824 – 1879), m. Deborah Little Archer
                    - Charles Henry Coe (1856 – 1954), m. Mayne Reid
                - Asahel Coe (1799 — 1884), m. Maria Wetmore
                  - Lauren Wetmore Coe (1835 – 1915), m. Martha Javins
                    - Louis Coe (1867 – 1928), m. Lydia Williams
                      - Benjamin Coe (1906 – 1989), m. Mary Plaisted
                        - Benjamin P. Coe (1930 – 2026), m. Jo-Anne L. Coe
                          - Kathryn Coombs, (m. 1st) Eric Royce, (m. 2nd) Simon Coombs
                  - William Coe (1841 — 1904), m. Margaret Jones
                    - Robert Edwin Coe (1872 — 1952), m. Gertrude Stella Mapes
              - Roswell Coe (1780 — 1825), m. Polly Porter
                - Willis Coe (1819 — 1912), m. Hannah Fenton
                  - George Washington Coe (1843 — 1920), m. Lois Ann Ives
                    - George Henry Coe (1882 — 1967), m. Blanch Mays
                      - Jack Coe Sr. (1918 — 1956), m. Juanita Scott
                        - Jack Coe Jr. (1944)
          - Mary Coe (1717 — 1789), (m. 2nd) James Crampton
            - Molly Crampton (1748 — 1797), m. James Kilbourn
              - Hiram Kilbourn (1786 — 1847), m. Eliza Seaman
                - Sarah Kilbourn (1839 — 1903), m. Elezear Bishop
                  - Billy Bishop (1894 – 1956), m. Margaret Burden
          - Thomas Coe (1727 — 1810), m. Mary Goodell
            - Zachariah Coe (1757 — 1841), m. Miriam Calkins
              - Cyrus Coe (1786 — 1853), m. Elsie Fenton
                - Nathaniel Coe (1836 — 1917), m. Emma Stinton
                  - Clarence E. Coe (1873 — 1943), m. Laura Bauder
                    - William Fenton Coe (1916 — 2006), m. Audree Hall
          - Levi Coe (1760 — 1832), (m. 2nd) Deborah McCall
            - Walter Coe (1798 — 1868), m. Mariana Kilbourne
              - Edward Coe (1834 — 1909), m. Louisa Bonney
                - Ernest F. Coe (1867 – 1951)
            - Levi Coe (1810 — 1832), m. Lavinia McNeil
        - Joseph Coe Sr. (1686 — 1754), m. Abigail Robinson
          - Joseph Coe Jr. (1713 — 1784), m. Abigail Curtiss
            - James Coe Sr. (1740 — 1794), m. Rachel Benton
              - James Coe Jr. (1769 — 1845), m. Nancy Pratt
                - Almon Coe (1796 — 1853), m. Climena Spelman
                  - Angeline Hannah Coe (1827 — 1919), m. Edwin Hillyer
                    - Edna Hillyer (1849 — 1936), m. Charles H. Ford
                      - Arthur Hillyer Ford (1874 — 1908), m. Sadie Hess
                    - Homer W. Hillyer (1859 – 1949), m. Harriet Robbins
                  - Samuel Buell Coe (1835 — 1910), m. Mary Cronkhite
                    - Henry Waldo Coe (1857 — 1927), m. Viola Boley
            - Curtis Coe (1750 — 1829), m. Anne Thompson
              - Eben Coe (1785 — 1862), (m. 1st) Mehitable Smith, (m. 2nd) Mary Upham
                - Henry Willard Coe (1814 — 1896), m. Hannah Huntington Smith
                  - Henry Willard Coe Jr. (1860 — 1943), m. Rhoda Sutcliffe
                    - Sada Sutcliffe Coe (1910 — 1979), m. Charles Robinson
                - Thomas Upham Coe (1837 — 1920), m. Sadie Loantha
            - Ebenezer Coe (1755 — 1839), m. Cleopatra Conklin
              - Isaac Coe (1782 — 1855), m. Rebecca Cook
            - Joel Coe (1758 — 1846), m. Huldah Horton
              - Joseph Coe (1784 – 1854), m. Sophia Harwood
              - Nathaniel Coe (1788 — 1868), m. Mary White
                - Henry C. Coe (1844 — 1928), m. Kittie Carlton
                - Lawrence Coe (1831 — 1897), m. Mary Graves
                  - Helen Coe (1860 — 1946), m. John Howard Sr.
                    - Sidney Howard (1891 — 1939), m. Clare Eames
                      - Jennifer Howard (1925 — 1993), m. Samuel Goldwyn Jr.
                        - Tony Goldwyn (1958), m. Jane Musky
              - Huldah Coe (1793 – 1866), m. Walter Bennett
                - Thomas Ford Bennett (1815 – 1904), m. Diana Howard
                  - Christopher Columbus Christian (1858 – 1921), Flora Diana Bennett
                    - Gladys Hope Christian (1891 – 1922), m. Manning Jeffries Mayfield
                      - Jane Wyman (1914 – 2007), m. Ronald Reagan
                        - Maureen Reagan (1941 – 2001), (m. 2nd) David Sills (m. 3rd) Dennis Revell
                        - Michael Reagan (1945 – 2026; adopted), (m. 1st) Pamela Gail Putnam, (m. 2nd) Colleen Sterns
              - Curtis Coe (1797 — 1871), m. Hannah Clark
                - Joel Horton Coe (1827 — 1905), (m. 1st) Wealthy Clark
                  - Arthur Edwin Coe (1854 — 1924), (m. 1st) Minnie Lees, (m. 2nd) Phoebe Pearre
                    - Robert Edwin Coe Sr. (1880 — 1970), m. Mary Shoemaker
                      - Curtis Claire Coe (1911 — 1996), m. Pearl Haney
                        - Donald E. Coe (1937 — 2014)
                        - Margaret Coe (1941), m. Mark Clarke
                          - Karin Clarke
                      - Robert E. Coe Jr. (1915 — 2003), m. Ethel Sanders
                    - Curtis P. Coe (1864 — 1922), m. Annie Bell Evans
                      - Milton Evans Coe (1899 — 1983), m. Loda Helene Davis
                        - Douglas Coe (1928 — 2017), m. Janice Muyskens
                - Curtis N. Coe (1830 — 1908), m. Martha Hammond
          - David Coe (1715 — 1807), m. Hannah Camp
            - Jesse Coe Sr. (1743 — 1824), m. Abigail Miller
              - Ezra Coe (1796 — 1869), m. Elizabeth Somberger
                - George Coe (1831 — 1906), m. Harriet Van Voorhis
                  - George Albert Coe (1862 – 1951), m. Sadie
            - Seth Coe (1756 — 1829), m. Mary Miller
              - Elias C. Coe (1787 — 1878), m. Hannah Tryon
                - Henry S. Coe (1830 — 1904), m. Hannah Bailey
                  - Wesley Roswell Coe (1869 — 1960), m. Charlotte Bush
            - Eli Coe Sr. (1758 — 1835), m. Rachel Miller
              - Eli Coe Jr. (1784 — 1847), m. Lois Coe
                - Isaac Coe (1816 — 1899), m. Sarah Bacon
                  - T. Eloise Coe (1852 — 1899), m. Frank P. Ireland
                    - Sarah Coe Ireland (1882 — 1977), m. William Hayward
                      - Leland Hayward (1902 — 1971), m. Margaret Sullavan
                        - Brooke Hayward (1937), m. Michael M. Thomas
          - Josiah Coe (1723 — 1798), m. Hannah
            - Phineas Coe (1753 — 1832), m. Rhoda Banning
              - Anson Coe (1784 — 1856), m. Anna Haynes
                - Hayden Coe (1811 — 1862), (m. 2nd) Josephine Lumpkin
                  - Hayden Lumpkin Coe (1860 — 1904), m. Sara Hughes
                    - Frederick Hayden Hughs Coe Sr. (1884 — 1914), m. Annette Harrell
                      - Fred Coe Jr. (1914 — 1979), m. Alice Griggs
        - John Coe Jr. (1693 — 1751), m. Hannah Parsons
          - Simeon Coe Sr. (1721 — 1782), m. Anna Morris
            - Simeon Coe Jr. (1755 — 1838), m. Eunice Strong
              - Simeon Maltby Coe (1784 – 1848), m. Mary Miles
                - George Coe (1811 — 1869), (m. 1st) Almira Mason, (m. 2nd) Rhoda Mason
                - Albert S. Coe (1817 — 1869), (m. 2nd) Lucy Cornelia Hollister
                  - Emma Louisa Coe (1865 — 1935), m. Wallace Hugh Whigham
                - Jonathan Coe (1819 — 1885), (m. 2nd) Sarah Murray
                  - Clarence Clinton Coe (1864 — 1936), m. Claudia Smith
                - Decius Octavius Coe (1820 — 1870), m. Eveline Stevens
          - Sibylla Coe (1723 – 1785), m. Joseph Hull
            - Elizabeth Hull (1747 – 1820), m. Levi Chapman
              - Sibyl Chapman (1768 – 1828), m. Joshua Shipman
                - Charles Shipman (1787 – 1860), m. Joanna Herrick Bartlett
                  - Betsey Sibyl Shipman (1816 – 1895), m. Beman Gates
                    - Mary Beman Gates (1842 – 1921), m. Rufus Dawes
                      - Charles G. Dawes (1925 – 1929), m. Caro Blymyer
                      - Rufus C. Dawes (1867 – 1940), m. Helen B. Palmer
                      - Beman Gates Dawes (1870 – 1953), m. Bertie Burr
                      - Henry May Dawes (1877 – 1952), m. Helen Moore Curtis
                - Samuel Shipman (1807 – 1880), m. Lucina Bingham
                  - Harriet Lucena Shipman (1834 – 1873), m. Martin Dewey Follett
                    - Alfred Dewey Follett (1858 – 1881), m. Lula Hopkins
                      - Jessie Hopkins Follett (1887 – 1966), m. David Albert Bartlett
                        - Dewey F. Bartlett (1919 – 1979), m. Ann Chilton Smith
                          - Dewey F. Bartlett Jr. (1947)
              - Hezekiah Chapman (1781 – 1808), m. Martha Allen
                - Ezra J. Chapman (1830 – 1875), m. Artisia Gray
                  - Oscar Allen Chapman (1874 – 1951), m. Mary Myrtle Clark
                    - Nancy Leigh Chapman (1897 – 1982), m. John Francis Loughran
                      - Charlotte Marie Loughran (1918 – 2013), m. Frederick John Weisenbach Jr.
                        - Sandra Lee Weisenbach (1946), m. Richard Dean Morgan
                          - Jeffrey Dean Morgan (1966), m. Hilarie Burton
        - Ephraim Coe Sr. (1698 — 1765), m. Hannah Comfort
          - Ephraim Coe Jr. (1724 — 1778), m. Anne Canfield
            - Timothy Coe (1760 — 1841), m. Mary Hall
              - Benson Coe (1793 — 1862), m. Esther Ward
                - Harlow Ward Coe (1816 — 1895), m. Mary Scoville
                  - Nathan W. Coe (1845 — 1943), m. Esther Melvina Churchill
                    - Daniel Coe (1755 — 1820), m. Martha
              - Daniel Coe(1794 — 1872), (m. 2nd) Mercy Wattles
                - May Coe (1846 —1931), m. James A. Jewell
                  - James R. Jewell (1878 — 1962), m. Edna Keith
            - Seth Coe (1771 — 1816), m. Eunice Roberts
              - Orris Coe (1815 — 1895), m. Paulina Bushnell
                - Edwin Coe (1840 – 1909), m. Emma Spaulding
                  - Robert K. Coe (1880 — 1952), m. Vera Christensen
          - Samuel Coe (1726 – 1790), m. Hope Hubbard
            - Israel Coe (1756 – 1821), m. Artemisia Wright
              - Harvey Coe (1785 – 1860), m. Deborah Eddy
                - Harriet Eliza Coe (1822 – 1894), m. Eleroy Curtis
                  - William Eleroy Curtis (1850 – 1911), m. Cora Belle Kepler
                    - Eleroy Curtis (1881 – 1943), m. Mary E. Steele
                      - Polly Curtis (1909 – 1965), m. Leonard Firestone
                        - Brooks Firestone (1936), m. Catherine Boulton
                          - Andrew Firestone (1975), m. Ivana Bozilovic
                    - Elsie Evans Curtis (1881 – 1940), m. George McKinley Mattis
                      - Molly M. Mattis (1909 – 1963), m. Hutchinson I. Cone
                        - Kitty Cone (1944 – 2015)
            - David Lyman Coe (1761 – 1824), m. Sarah Pratt
              - Claudius Lucius Coe (1786 – 1859), m. Nancy Ann Emory
                - Emery John Coe (1839 – 1905), m. Arvilla Knowlton
                  - Frank Egbert Coe (1866 – 1938), m. Catherine Eugenia Mahan
                    - Donald Mahan Coe (1889 – 1975), m. Alice M. Lewis
                      - Donald Mahan Coe Jr. (1914 – 1986), m. Dorothy Ruth Wilson
                        - David Allen Coe (1939 – 2026), m. Jody Lynn Benham
                          - Tyler Mahan Coe
        - Abigail Coe (1702 — 1747), m. John Guthrie
          - Sarah Guthrie (1744 — 1792), m. Reuben Murray
            - Aurora Murray (1785 — 1867), m. Isaac Jerome
              - Leonard Jerome (1817 — 1891), m. Clarissa Hall
                - Jeanette Jerome (1854 — 1921), m. Lord Randolph Churchill
                  - Winston Churchill (1874 — 1965), m. Clementine Hozier
                    - Diana Churchill (1909 — 1963), (m. 2nd) Duncan Sandys
                      - Edwina Sandys (1938), m. Piers Dixon
                        - Hugo Dixon (1963)
                    - Randolph Churchill (1911 — 1968), (m. 1st) Pamela Digby, (m. 2nd) June Osborne
                      - Winston Churchill (1940 — 2010)
                      - Arabella Churchill (1949 — 2007)
                    - Sarah Churchill (1914 — 1982)
                    - Mary Churchill (1922 — 2014), m. Christopher Soames
                      - Nicholas Soames (1948), (m. 1st) Catherine Weatherall, (m. 2nd) Serena Smith
                      - Rupert Soames (1959), m. Camilla Dunne
                  - Jack Churchill (1880 — 1974), m. Gwendoline Bertie
    - Benjamin Coe I (1628 — 1694), m. Abigail Carman
      - Joseph Coe I (1665 — 1742), m. Judith Wheeler
        - Joseph Coe II (1704 — 1760), m. Esther
          - Joseph Coe III (1738 — 1825), m. Abigail Moone
            - Joseph Coe IV (1768 — 1842), m. Mary Gibbons
              - Joseph Gibbons Coe (1796 — 1855), m. Sarah Winans
                - Sylvester Coe (1821 — 1891), m. Ann Rowland
                  - Clarence S. Coe (1865 — 1939), m. Lula Joy
                  - William T. Coe (1870 — 1950), m. Anabel Collins
        - Benjamin Coe (1709 — 1800), m. Rachel Prudden
          - Ebenezer Coe (1736 — 1827), m. Eunice Jagger
            - Stephen Coe (1770 — 1835), m. Margaret Stewart
              - Moses Coe (1798 — 1831), m. Elizabeth McElderry
                - Jonathan Coe (1824 — 1886), m. Mary Ann Weaver
                  - Cassius M. Coe (1855 — 1901), m. Marie Evelyn Lister
          - Moses Coe (1750 — 1813), m. Sarah Howell
            - Jeanette Coe (1782 — 1865), m. John Gibson
              - William Harvey Gibson (1821 – 1894), m. Martha Creeger
              - James Gibson (1823 – 1898), m. Margaret Poole
                - Albert Gibson (1851 — 1909), m. Lillian Griffith
                  - Emily Gibson (1884 – 1966), m. Warder Braerton
            - Daniel Coe (1801 — 1851), m. Mary Gladden
              - Sarah Coe (1831 — 1901), m. John Robinson
                - James E. Robinson (1868 — 1932), m. Lula Flickinger
                  - Pauline Robinson (1896 — 1949), m. Marvin Pierce
                    - Martha Ann Pierce (1920 – 1999), m. Walter Rafferty
                      - Kevin Rafferty (1947 – 2020)
                    - Barbara Pierce (1925 — 2018), m. George H. W. Bush
                      - George W. Bush (1946), m. Laura Welch
                        - Barbara Bush (1981), m. Craig Coyne
                        - Jenna Bush (1981), m. Henry Hager
                      - Pauline Robinson Bush (1949 — 1953)
                      - Jeb Bush (1953), m. Columba Gallo
                        - George P. Bush (1976), m. Amanda Williams
                      - Neil Bush (1955), m. Sharon Smith
                        - Lauren Bush (1984), m. David Lauren
                      - Marvin Pierce Bush (1956), m. Margaret Molster
                      - Dorothy Bush (1959), (m. 2nd) Robert P. Koch
        - Thomas Coe (1715 – 1794), (m. 2nd) Sarah Douglas
          - Mary Coe (1752 – 1827), m. Jonathan Dickerson
            - Mahlon Dickerson (1770 – 1853)
            - Mary Dickerson (1778 – 1830), m. David Canfield
              - Mahlon Canfield (1798 – 1865), m. Louisa Seward
                - Carolina Canfield (1834 – 1922), m. Joseph Beattie
                  - Agnes Beattie (1875 – 1919), m. Ulysses Stewart
                    - Virginia Stewart (1895 – 1986), m. James Lawton Collins
                      - James Lawton Collins Jr. (1917 – 2002), m. Yolande de Mauduit
                        - Michael Collins (1930 – 2021), m. Patricia Finnegan
                          - Kate Collins (1959)
            - Philemon Dickerson (1788 – 1862), m. Syndey Stotesbury
              - Edward N. Dickerson (1824 – 1889), m. Mary Nystrom
      - Benjamin Coe II (1660 — 1707), m. Mary Everett
        - Benjamin Coe III (1702 — 1788), m. Abigail
          - Benjamin Coe IV (1738 — 1818), m. Bethia Grummon
            - Abigail Coe (1776 — 1853), m. William Whitehead
              - William Adee Whitehead (1810), m. Margaret Parker
                - Cortlandt Whitehead (1842 — 1922), m. Charlotte Burgoyne King
                  - John Whitehead (1869 — 1934), m. Martha Sharpe
                    - Aliph Van Cortlandt (1905 — 1973), m. Floyd Crosby
                      - David Crosby (1941 – 2023), m. Jan Dance
            - Aaron Coe (1779 — 1857), m. Catherine Elmer
              - Julia Coe (1807 — 1848), m. Nathan W. Condit
              - Philemon Elmer Coe (1815 — 1873)

== See also ==
- American pioneers
- Fundamental Orders of Connecticut
- History of immigration to the United States
- County courthouse architecture in colonial America
