= Albert S. Coe =

American politician

Member of the Illinois House of Representatives
- In office 1867–1868

Personal details
- Born: Albert Sheridan Coe; October 1, 1817 Rush, New York
- Died: October 17, 1869 (aged 52) Coe Township, Rock Island County, Illinois
- Spouse: Lucy Cornelia Hollister
- Children: 8
- Relatives: George; Decius; Clarence; Descendants of Robert Coe
- Profession: Politician

Albert Sheridan Coe (October 1, 1817 — October 17, 1869) was an American politician and agriculturist. He served in the Illinois House of Representatives in the 25th Illinois General Assembly and held various local public offices. He settled Coe Township, Rock Island County, Illinois, which was named for him.

He and his second wife, Lucy Coe (née Hollister) had six children, including Emma Louisa Coe who married Wallace Hugh Whigham, a professor at the University of Chicago Law School. Coe is a descendant of the American colonist and early politician Robert Coe. His brothers George and Decius, and his nephew, Clarence Coe were also politicians.
