= Isaac Coe =

American frontier physician (1782–1855)

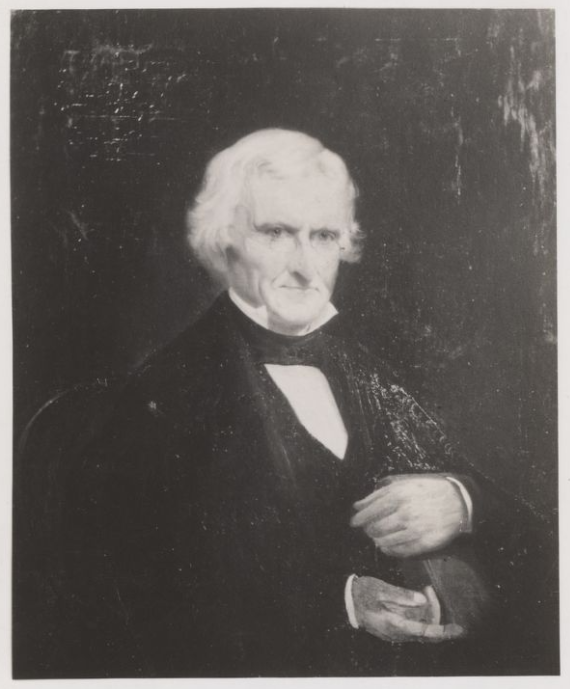
- Born: July 25, 1782; Near Dover, New Jersey, US
- Died: July 30, 1855 (aged 73); Galena, Illinois, US
- Burial place: Crown Hill Cemetery and Arboretum, Section 1, Lot 67; 39.8181923°N 86.1733816°W
- Education: Queen's College (MBBS); New Medical Institute of New York (MD)
- Relatives: Joseph Coe (grandfather); Nathaniel Coe (cousin); Descendants of Robert Coe

Isaac Coe (July 25, 1782 – July 30, 1855) was an American frontier medical doctor, a founder and commissioner of Indianapolis, and a leader in the Presbyterian church. He is credited for saving the town from an 1821 plague of malaria. He was a founding member of the Indiana State Medical Society and served as its first chair and its second president. He founded the first church, Presbyterian Church of Indianapolis, and the Sunday school and served as the superintendent. He led organizing of the state's anti-gambling society, which resulted in the state's first prohibition on gambling.

His homes in Indianapolis are now the sites of Sidney & Lois Eskenazi Hospital and The Columbia Club. Coe, Indiana, is named for him.

== Early life and education ==
Coe was born near Dover, New Jersey, to Ebenezer and Cleopatra Coe (née Conklin). He received Christian training growing up. He is a descendant of Robert Coe, a New England Colonist and early politician.

Coe manufactured glass in Utica, New York, before enrolling at Queen's College at age 30 to obtain a Bachelor of Medicine, Bachelor of Surgery degree. He graduated in 1815 from the New Medical Institute in New York City, obtaining a Doctor of Medicine. He practiced medicine at Bellevue Hospital, then hospitals in New Jersey and Martinsburg, Virginia, for six years.

In 1837, he briefly returned east to study homeopathy at the New York School of Homeopathy.

== Career and legacy ==
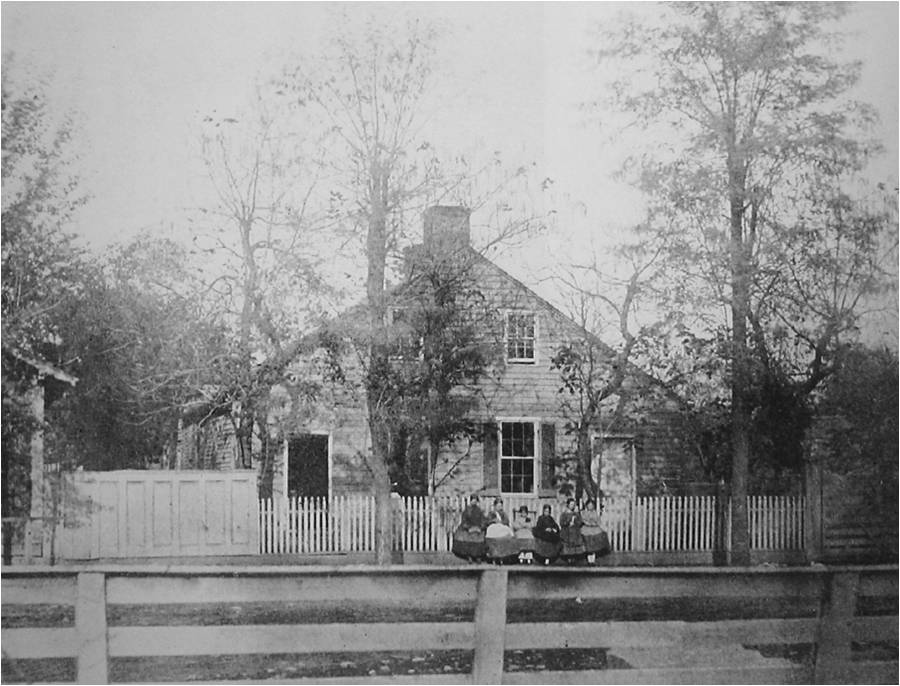
Coe's second home c. 1840

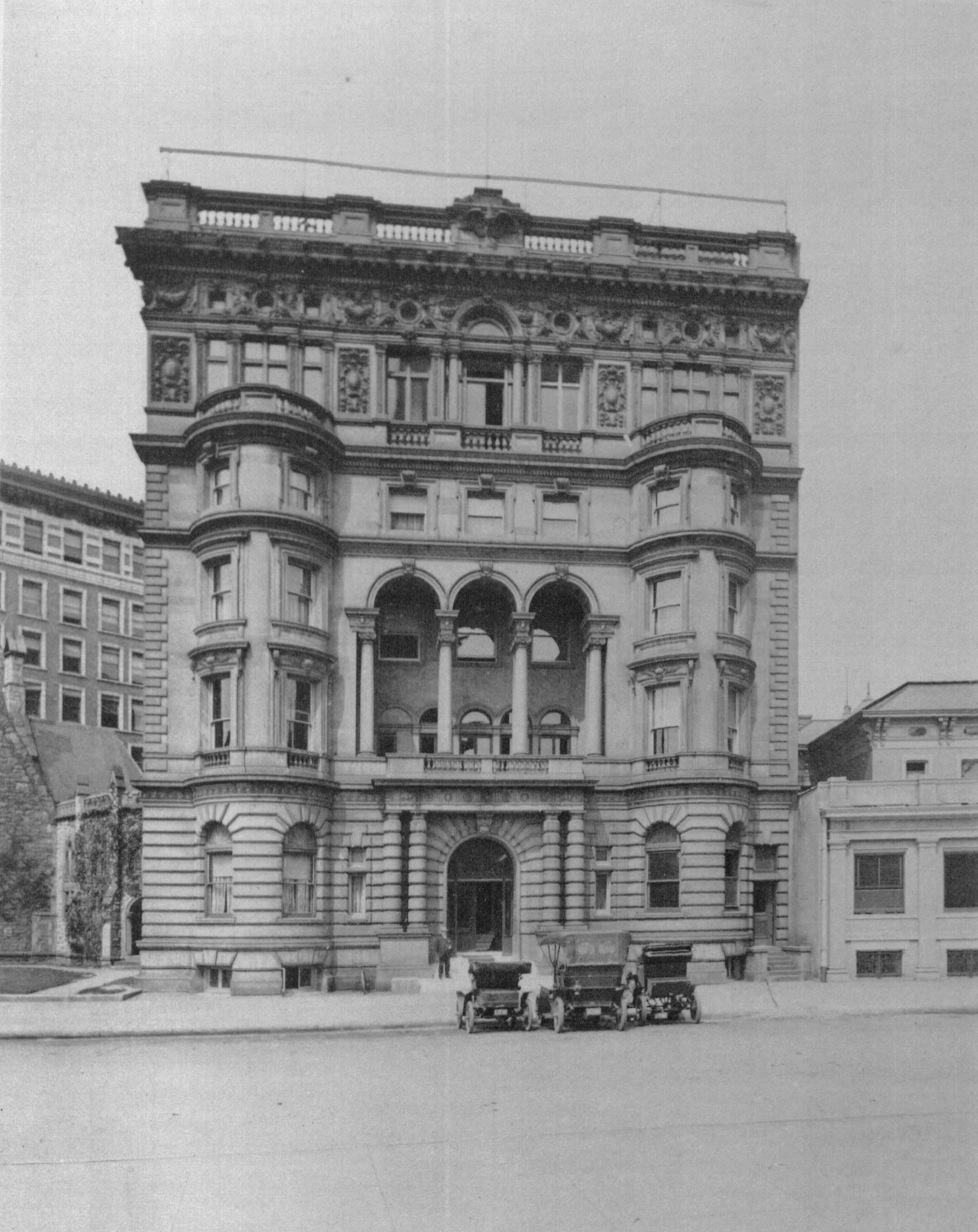
The site of Coe's second home is now The Columbia Club.

Coe arrived in Madison, Indiana, in early 1821, before relocating to Indianapolis in May. He was the town's first physician with a medical degree (Note: He was the second practicing physician in the town; the first did not attend medical school.) and is credited with saving the town from a malaria outbreak that nearly wiped out the town's citizens. He was a founding member of the Indiana State Medical Society and served as its first chair and its second president. He was a founder and superintendent of the Sunday school, a Bible School for adults, and the first church, Presbyterian Church of Indianapolis, which he designed and planned, and served as an Elder for 30 years. He also led organizing of the state's anti-gambling society, which successfully led to the state's first prohibition on gambling.

Coe was a commissioner of Indianapolis, including the Fund commissioner the Indiana Mammoth Internal Improvement Act. The law added $10 million in funding for public works. Due to the Panic of 1837 and the area's geography, many of the projects failed and the town was nearly bankrupted.

In his biographical sketch of Coe, Senator Oliver H. Smith said that he laughed at Coe for suggesting the capital of Indiana would someday be home to 5,000 people, which was in the woods at the time. By 1850, the capital had surpassed 8,000, and at the time of his death, more than 20,000. Smith wrote, "few men did as much as the Dr. to form society at Indianapolis".

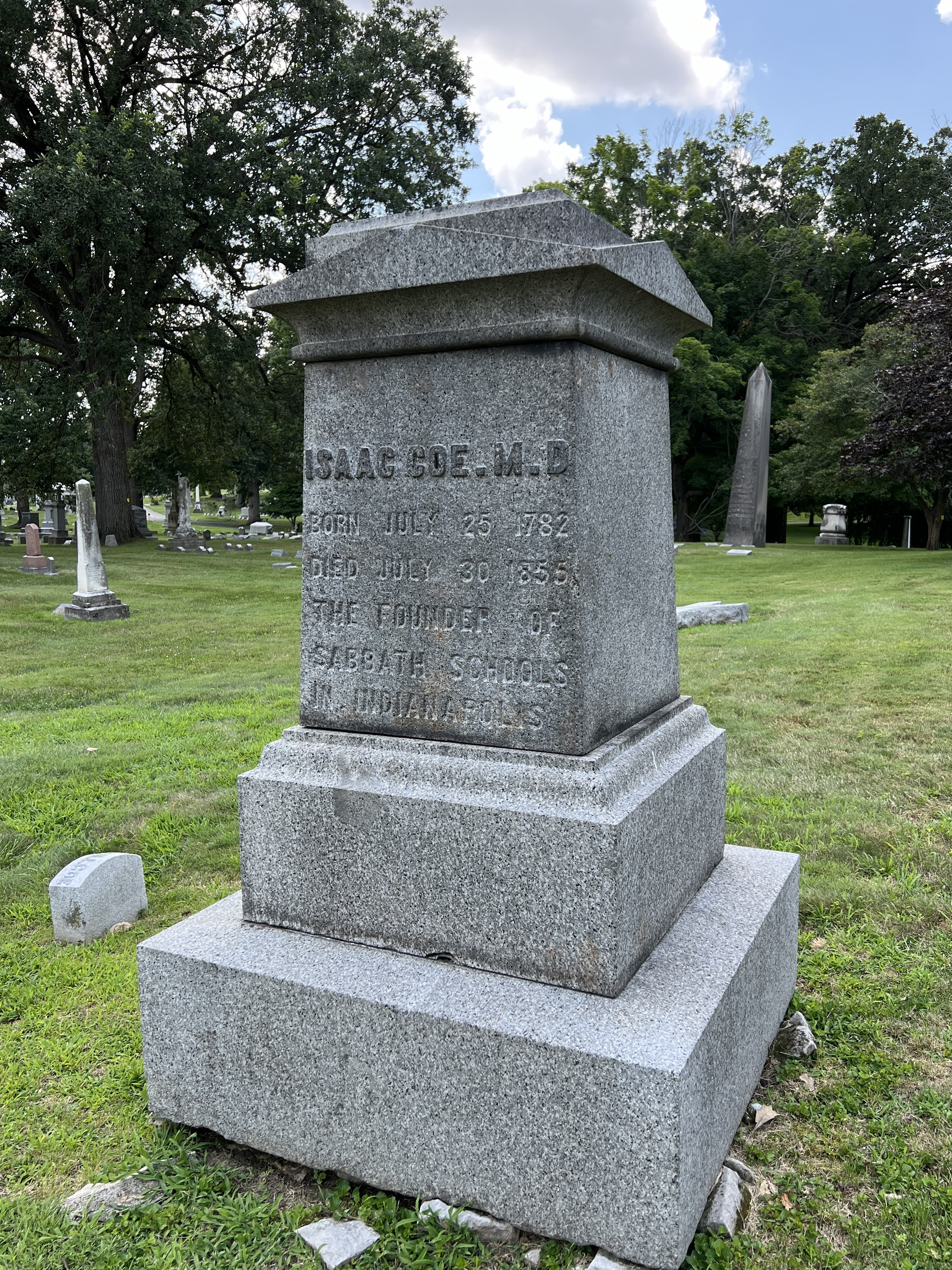
Tombstone at Crown Hill Cemetery and Arboretum

He is buried next to his wife, Rebecca Coe (née Cook) at the Crown Hill Cemetery in Indianapolis (Section 1, Lot 67). His homes in the city are now the sites of Sidney & Lois Eskenazi Hospital and The Columbia Club.

He is the namesake of Coe, Indiana, originally called Arcadia.
