= Elizabeth Bartlett =

Elizabeth Bartlett may refer to:

- Elizabeth Bartlett (British poet) (1924–2008), British poet
- Elizabeth Bartlett (American poet) (1911–1994), American poet and writer
- Elizabeth French Bartlett (1877–1961), American genealogist

== See also ==
- Elizabeth Bartlet (disambiguation)
