= Nathaniel Coe =

American pioneer and politician (1788–1868)

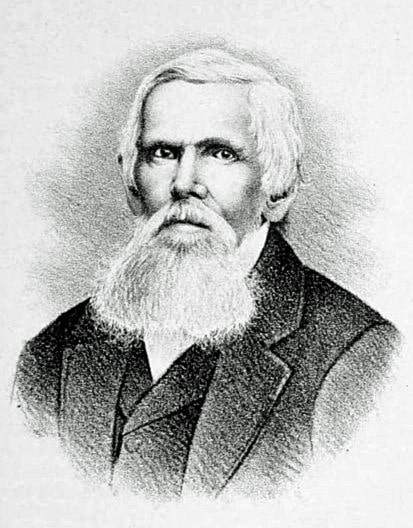
- Sketch of Nathaniel Coe, c. 1850

Special Postal Agent for the Pacific Northwest
- In office 1850–1854
- Nominated by: Millard Fillmore

Member of the New York State Assembly (Allegany Co.)
- In office 1843–1847

Personal details
- Born: September 6, 1788 Morristown, New Jersey, US
- Died: October 17, 1868 (aged 80) Hood River, Oregon, US
- Party: Whig (until 1856)
- Children: 6, including Henry
- Relatives: Joseph Coe (brother); Joseph Coe (grandfather); Isaac Coe (cousin); Descendants of Robert Coe
- Education: Juris Doctor
- Occupation: Public official
- Known for: Founding Hood River, Oregon
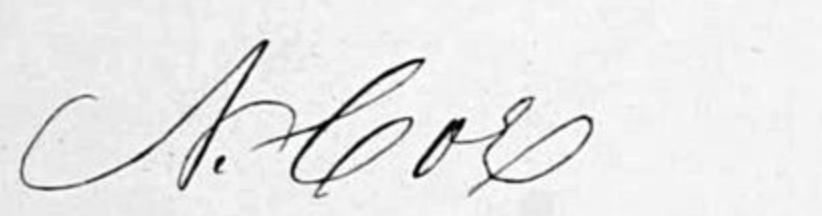
- Signature

Nathaniel Coe (September 6, 1788 – October 17, 1868) was an American pioneer, Whig politician, War of 1812 veteran, and frontier agriculturist who founded Hood River, Oregon. He was considered a radical for his strong opposition to slavery and support for progressive legislation for women's rights. Coe served in municipal, every level of state, and executive government offices, both through appointment and election. He was elected to serve four terms in the New York State Assembly. In 1850, Coe declined a nomination to serve on the United States Senate to instead accept President Millard Fillmore's appointment as the Special Postal Agent for the Pacific Northwest.

After settling in Oregon Territory, he developed the Hood River Valley's thriving fruit industry and served as the first chair of the Hood River County School District.

== Early life and family ==
Coe was born on September 6, 1788, in Morristown, New Jersey, to Joel and Huldah Coe (née Horton). Coe is the fourth great-grandson of public official Robert Coe, the colonial public official, and the fifth great-grandson of Barnabas Horton, another colonist who built the first buildings on Long Island and the progenitor of the family that founded Tim Hortons. Mount Coe and Coe Glacier are named for his son, Henry C. Coe, who platted the town of Hood River, Oregon, and made the first ascent of Mount Adams. Coe is the great-grandfather of Sidney Howard, the screen writer of Gone with the Wind. Their genealogy was featured in an episode of Who Do You Think You Are? on TLC starring Howard's grandson, actor Tony Goldwyn.

In 1795, his family relocated to Scipio in rural Upstate New York, where he grew up. Coe was well educated, studying at Aurora Academy in Aurora, Erie County, New York, and receiving the title of esquire with a law degree. He served in the military, rising to the rank of captain, and fought in the War of 1812. In 1818, he returned to his family who had relocated to Nunda, New York.

Originally intent on becoming a lawyer, Coe instead joined the Baptist ministry and traveled through the south working as a surveyor and in sawmills. He worked as a penmanship teacher using the Lancasterian System in New Orleans for eight years. During this time, he also served as a captain in the War of 1812.

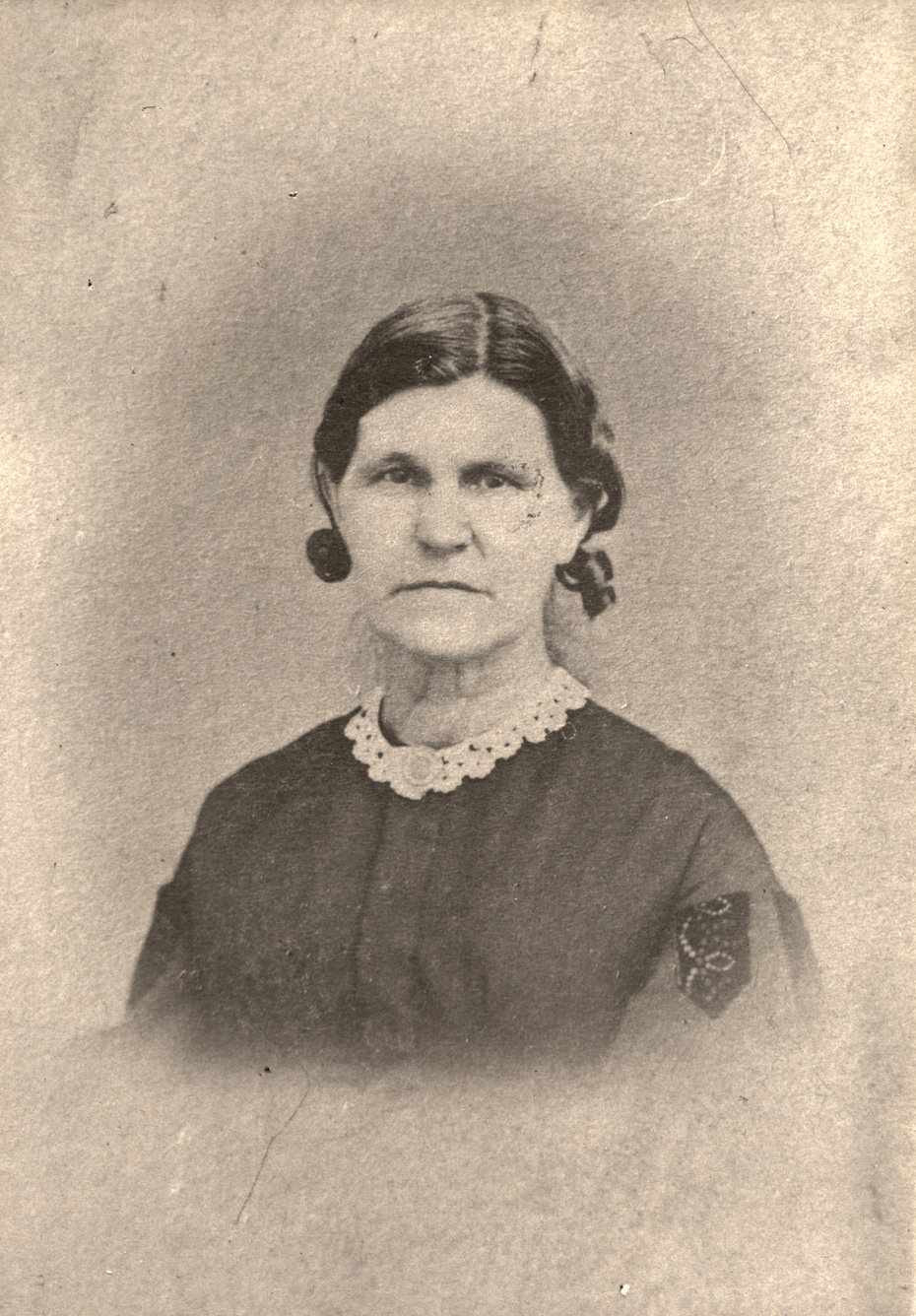
A portrait of Mary Coe (née White), Coe's wife

In 1828, Coe returned to settle in Nunda, where he was later appointed the clerk of the village. There he met and married Mary White, a poet and literature scholar. They had four sons and two daughters. Both daughters died in childhood in Nunda. Coe founded one of the first churches there in 1819, which was converted into the Nunda Literary Institute in the 1840s.

== Political career ==
Coe became a politician serving Allegany County, New York, with an appointment as justice of the peace, and three successful elections to the New York State Assembly in 1843, 1844, and 1845. He also represented Livingston County, New York, for one term in the state legislature in 1847. His politics were extremely progressive for the time period. He was a member of the Whig Party and strongly anti-slavery and fought for the equal rights of women. He was considered by many of his peers to be a radical, but was esteemed and well-respected.

In the 1830s, the Coes hosted a gathering for a "female society supporting moral purity"—the American Female Moral Reform Society (FMR)—an early women's rights advocacy group against rape culture and misogyny billed as "anti-seduction" to protect women. They then formed the Nunda chapter of FMR. At the time, men who raped women were not charged with a crime and the victims were deemed unfit for marriage and often had no choice but to enter the sex industry as prostitutes. During the 71st session of the Assembly, Coe introduced the first-of-its-kind anti-rape bill "An act to punish seduction", which passed into law on March 22, 1848. The Married Women's Property Act was passed into law the following month, and in Seneca, New York, a few months later, women demanded the right to vote for the first time.

Coe was appointed to state auditor of New York. In 1850, he was nominated to represent New York in the United States Senate, but he declined. Instead, he accepted the nomination to serve as the Special Postal Agent for the Pacific Northwest from President Millard Fillmore. Coe first arrived in Oregon in Portland to survey the Umpqua and Rogue River for the Post Office Department a year prior to his family's settlement in the Hood River Valley. There were very few roads and travel was mostly along waterways. The federal government invested heavily into the development of the Post Office Department in the area for the potential for growing businesses in Oregon and California and the importance of timely delivery of correspondence. His work stretched across all of Washington and Oregon territories to just east of the Rocky Mountains by waterway on the steamer Canemah and horseback. The Canemah had a fatal accident when a flue exploded on August 8, 1853, killing a passenger. It sank the following September, was decommissioned and taken to Vancouver. Coe established the first post office at The Dalles.

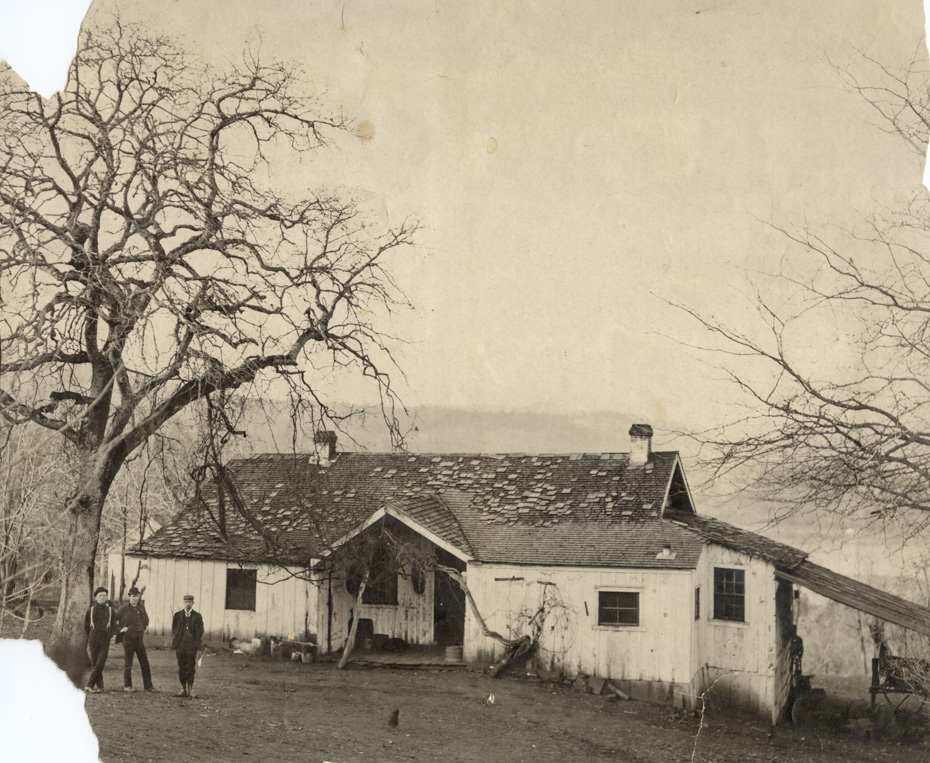
House built by Coe, first building erected in Hood River, Oregon

== Founding of Hood River ==
In 1853, upon Democrat Franklin Pierce's presidential election, a Democratic postal agent was appointed and Coe and his family platted and cultivated the Hood River, donating their government land grant for the establishment of Hood River. They planted the first orchards filled with 300 trees and bushes of apples, pears, apricots, strawberries, peaches, and plums. The first year of harvesting bore 1,000 pounds (450 kg) of peaches.

His wife Mary led an initiative to change the name of the Dog River in Oregon to its current name, Hood River, for nearby Mount Hood, which she thought was more respectable. The name had come from the Lewis and Clark Expedition who had named it "La Biche", which had been misinterpreted to be the Old English word "bicce", a vulgar slur for female dog. Another story was of an early group of explorers who had been so starved for food that they began to eat dogs while they camped there. It was officially changed in 1858. The rest of the valley took on a similar name and the success of fruit growing led to the formation of the Hood River Fruit Growers Union, the first agricultural cooperative in the Pacific Northwest. The area became an agricultural cradle when the first commercial orchard was planted in the 1880s.

The first building in the town was the school, now the site of the Mt. Hood Hotel. In 1865, Coe served as the Hood River County School District's first chair and held the first meeting in his home.

== Tensions with the Klickitats ==
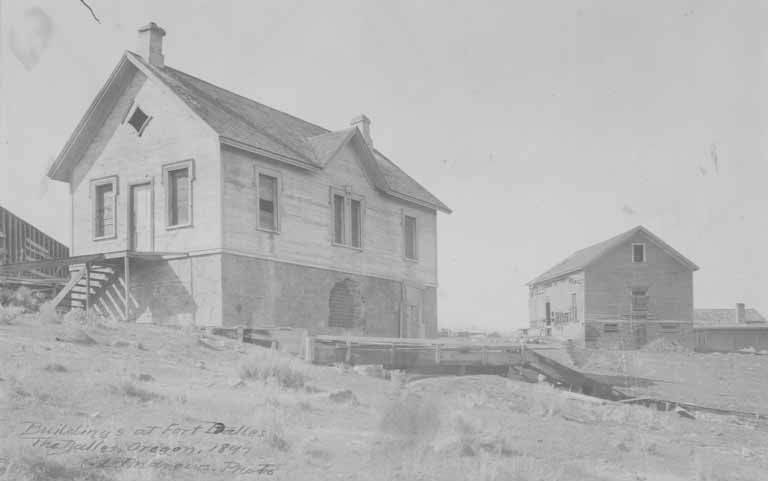
Buildings at Fort Dalles, 1897

In the early 1800s, following the Lewis and Clark encounters, the Klickitat people used their power in numbers to levy a tax on settlers passing through Wishram village eventually opening depots for collecting furs. The Klickitat were skilled and by 1843 had developed working relationships with the settlers, hiring out farmhands and scouting in the war for hostile tribes.

In 1850, the Donation Land Claim Act was passed as an incentive for settlers to move west and homestead with a guaranteed donation of 640 acres (260 ha) per family. Natives were dispossessed of their lands and pushed onto reservations to make room for settlers. In some cases, the Klickitat fought for their land rights in court and won. The Tututni tribe from Rogue River grew increasingly hostile. In 1853, a group of Klickitat, their Chief Quatley, and Joseph Lane held a conference with the Tututni in which arms were called and Quatley and Lane held the Tututni chief hostage while they signed a peace agreement. The native rights to land, including those won in court, were not upheld by the government. In 1855, the Klickitat were ordered north of the Columbia River and east of the Cascade Range into Eastern Washington. Later that year, the Walla Walla Council was called to make peace between the settlers and the tribes. The Klickitat refused to attend, but Chief Kamiakin's signature on the treaty forfeited their rights to their lands.

The implications of the council ignited the high tensions between natives and settlers in the area into the Rogue River Wars and the Yakima War. Coe fled the area with his family and joined the other settlers and some of the Klickitat at Fort Dalles, where they stayed until it was safe to return to the area around 1859. Coe died on October 17, 1868.

== See also ==
- Bush family – includes other descendants of Robert Coe
- History of Oregon
- History of New York (state)
