= Coe Township =

Coe Township may refer to the following places in the United States:

- Coe Township, Rock Island County, Illinois
- Coe Township, Michigan
