= Frantz Hunt Coe =

American physician

- Born: November 28, 1856; St. Charles, Illinois
- Died: July 16, 1904 (aged 47); Seattle
- Occupations: Physician, public official and educator
- Spouse: Carrie Everett
- Children: 3
- Relatives: Descendants of Robert Coe

Frantz Hunt Coe (1856–1904) was a Seattle physician, public official and educator.

== Life ==
Coe was born November 28, 1856, in St. Charles, Illinois to Matthew Daniel Coe, M.D., and his wife Susan Farwell. He first attended the University of Michigan, where he graduated with an AB in 1879, and became a teacher. Shortly afterward, on August 17, 1880, he married Carrie Everett of Chelsea, Michigan.

With his father a physician, and not being quite satisfied on a teacher's salary, he went to medical school in 1884. (He is listed as a student in the Ann Arbor, Michigan address directory in 1886.) He graduated in 1888 with an M.D.

Coe and his wife promptly moved to Seattle, where in 1890 he is listed as partners with Gideon A. Weed "Physicians & Surgeons" at 606 Pike Street. A family researcher states that he was also surgeon for the Northern Pacific Railway and Seattle Traction Company and secretary of the Washington State Medical Society. He was Seattle's Public Health Officer in 1898.

"He wrote in his journal, 'I am absolutely satisfied women make better principals than men and wish to open up a new era in Seattle schools.'"

He served on the Seattle School Board from 1901 to 1904, his term ending with his death on July 16, 1904, in Seattle. Due to his prominence in the community and his enduring work for education, the Coe Elementary School was named after him in 1907.

Coe and his wife had two sons, Herbert and Harry, and one daughter, Francel (Frances?).
