= J. Gardner Bartlett =

Joseph Gardner Bartlett (25 August 1872 – 11 November 1927) was a prominent American genealogist, whose work focused on colonial New England and the English origins of colonial families. Trained as an architect at MIT, he gave up architecture for genealogy in his thirties. His best-known works include two genealogies of the Stone family (published 1918 and 1926) and The Henry Adams Genealogy (1927), which treated the family of Henry Adams, immigrant ancestor of the two American presidents by this surname. Bartlett's paternal ancestors bore the surname Kilham until 1845, when his father changed his surname to Bartlett.

== Early life and marriages ==
Joseph Gardner Bartlett was born on 25 August 1872 to Joseph Elbridge Bartlett and Antoinette Frances (née Carpenter). On 30 April 1900, Bartlett married Gretchen Piper. Together, he and Gretchen had three children: Dorothy Pickering (born ca. 1901), Dudley Bradstreet (born ca. 1903), and Phillips Payson (born ca. 1905). They divorced sometime after 1910. His second wife, Elizabeth French, was also a genealogist.

== Career ==
In 1896, Bartlett was elected a member of the New England Historic Genealogical Society; he was made a life member in 1919. In 1920, Bartlett was elected as a member of the Cambridge Historical Society.

=== Selected works ===
- Bartlett, J. G. (1911). Robert Coe, Puritan: His Ancestors and Descendants, 1340-1910, with Notices of Other Coe Families. Privately printed. p. 2. "Robert Coe, puritan; his ancestors and descendants, 1340-1910, with notices of other Coe families.": A genealogy of Robert Coe.
- Bartlett, J. G.; Talbot Walker, Emily (1917). The English ancestry of Peter Talbot of Dorchester, Mass. Privately printed.
- Bartlett, J. G. (1927). Henry Adams of Somersetshire, England, and Braintree, Mass.: His English Ancestry and Some of His Descendants. Privately printed.
