= Andrew Warde =

American lawyer

Andrew Warde (1597–1659) was a colonist, judge, farmer, and a founding father of the Connecticut towns of Wethersfield, Stamford, and Fairfield.

== Life ==
Coat of Arms of Andrew Warde

Andrew Warde was born in Sheffield, England, in 1597. He emigrated to New England with the Winthrop Fleet, arriving at Watertown, Massachusetts Bay Colony, in 1633. In Watertown, Warde assumed early prominence as a man of affairs; he was made a freeman of the town on May 14, 1634. His name is recorded in the second book of inventory, as having "an homestall of 10 acres, by estimation". He held this estate until 1642, some seven or more years after he had left Watertown. By 1640, Warde also owned over 350 acres of land in Weathersfield, Connecticut Colony.

A historical marker in Wethersfield credit Warde with the other nine adventurers who founded arguably the oldest English town in Connecticut. "In 1634, at a deep bend in the Connecticut River, John Oldham and nine other adventurers from Watertown were welcomed by the Wongunk Indians, anxious to trade beaver pelts. Marsh hay in the low meadows and the rich alluvial soil soon attracted settlers who planted their farms on the broad terrace above the River. The surrounding forest gave up timber for houses, and the town was laid out with a Common alongside the present Cove. The settlers named the town Wethersfield. At that time it included the parishes of Rocky Hill to the south, Newington to the west, and Glastonbury to the east, across the river, where they pastured their livestock."

In 1635/36, he was one of several (eight) persons granted to govern the people at Connecticut by the general court of Massachusetts Bay colony under Gov. Winthrop. Along with other founders of Connecticut, he likely attended the meeting that resulted in the Fundamental Orders of Connecticut.

In 1640, Warde, Robert Coe, and eighteen others founded and settled the plantation of Toquams (later called Stamford) that had recently been purchased from the Natives. There he was the Constable (1642) and then Magistrate (1647). His final settlement was in Fairfield.

== Legacy ==
On June 13, 1907, a monument to Andrew Ward was unveiled in Fairfield cemetery, and a speech was made in celebration of his life by Henry C. Sturges, Esq.

== Sources ==
- Ward, George Kemp (1910). Andrew Warde and his descendants, 1597-1910. New York: A.T. De la Mare Printing and Publishing Company. p. 622. OCLC 9865206.
