= Henry C. Coe =

American pioneer

Henry Clay Coe (August 11, 1844 – December 4, 1928) was an American pioneer, sea captain, and mountaineer in Oregon; and the Republican mayor of Manhattan Beach, California. Coe Glacier is named after him, after he, with five others, first ascended the north side of Mount Hood to reach its peak. He was in the expedition thought by George H. Himes to have made the first ascent of Mount Adams in 1863. He was chair of the Independent Order of Odd Fellows, the Knights of Pythias, and the Ancient Order of United Workmen.

== Early life and career ==
Coe was born in Livingston County, New York, to Nathaniel Coe and Mary née White. He had three brothers and a sister. They are descended from the American colonial Robert Coe. When he was 19, he began a course of study at Pacific University in Forest Grove. Upon completion, he learned to operate steamboats, working his way through every position on the ship beginning as a deckhand and becoming a licensed captain in 1877. He took his first job in the early 1860s with Wells Fargo & Company as an expressman. In 1869, he married Mary Ella "Kittie" née Carlton. (Note: This is at times mistranscribed as "Catton".) They had five children and primarily resided in Portland.

== Climbing activities ==
In 1863, Coe joined an expedition with his father, an indigenous guide called "Indian Johnson" and seven others from White Salmon, Washington, to visit Camas prairie, the Big Four Ice Caves, and Trout Lake. When they arrived at the lake, Coe said they could see Mount Adams, and discussed adding it to their trip. Johnson told them he knew of a good trail to and from it. They moved their camp closer to the mountain and attempted the ascent the next day on August 24, 1863. Coe's father and most of the others turned back due to the difficulty, but Coe, the guide, and two others reached the southeastern summit in six hours as a storm moved in and they turned back. Coe returned again on August 2, 1864 his brother Charles, Thomas Condon, Johnson, and two others and successfully summited the peak. On the descent, Coe noticed a slope that would make a good toboggan ride and sat on an empty pie tin to descend six miles in 20 minutes. He returned again in 1867, joined again by his brother Charles, Johnson, and ten others, including the son of Cushing Eells, Edwin. Nine in the party completed the ascent in seven hours. One of the ascenders, Samuel L. Brook, made the descent by sledding down on a pie tin. After publishing in 1907 that Coe, Condon and the others were first to ascend the mountain in 1864, George H. Himes told Edmond S. Meany of an account from Andrew Glenn Aiken that he, Edward Jay Allen, and Andrew J. Burge, had left Steilacoom, Washington, to begin work on a military road there. He said that while camped there in August 1854, they decided to ascend the peak, though no contemporaneous accounts such as diaries or letters exist. Himes said that he trusted the word of Aiken, thus Meany updated the credit for the first ascent to the Aiken, Allen, and Burge in a 1917 issue of The Mountaineer.

Coe wished to improve recreational access to Mount Hood after noticing a path on the northside of the mountain that appeared an easier climb than previous ascents. He, Oscar Stranahan, David Cooper, and James Graham then applied for a charter to develop a road there. Later that year, in September 1884, Coe, Stranahan, and Cooper, were joined by Henry Tomlinson, George Winner, and Will Langille in an expedition along the route parallel to Evans Creek to make the first ascent on the mountain's northside. All six successfully completed the ascent. After reaching the summit, members of the party selected prominent geographic features that interested them and associated their names with them. These included Cooper Spur, Coe Glacier, Stranahan Ridge, and Stranahan Falls. Coe Glacier consequently preserved Coe's name as part of the geography of Mount Hood. Graham withdrew from the project, leaving Coe, Stranahan, and Cooper to develop the initial road by themselves, uncompensated, in 1886. They subsequently widened the road for wagons in 1887, and Charles Erskine Scott Wood purchased the charter and developed an adjacent passenger road in 1889, and the Cloud Cap Inn.

== Political and personal life ==
Coe and his wife moved to Manhattan Beach, California, at the beginning of the 20th century, and in 1914, Coe ran in the local trustee election, for which he was elected. He later served as the mayor. Coe died of third-degree burns and shock in 1928 after his clothes caught fire from a gas heater. Coe made a "strange" request upon his death that there be no funeral or ceremony of any kind and no flowers and that he be cremated and his ashes spread amongst the Hood River Valley.

== Publications ==
- Coe, Henry C. (July 28, 1895). "Ascent of Mt. Adams". The Sunday Oregonian. Portland, Oregon. p. 8.
- Coe, Henry C. (August 7, 1923). "In Peril of Death: Enters Icy Trap in Columbia Rapids". Los Angeles Evening Post-Record. Los Angeles, California. p. 3.
