= Elizabeth Bartlet =

Elizabeth Bartlet may refer to:

- Elizabeth Bartlet (musicologist) (1948–2005), Canadian musicologist
- Elizabeth Bartlet Westin (created 2003), a character on The West Wing

== See also ==
- Elizabeth Bartlett (disambiguation)
