= Emily Gibson Braerton =

American activist and clubwoman (1884–1966)

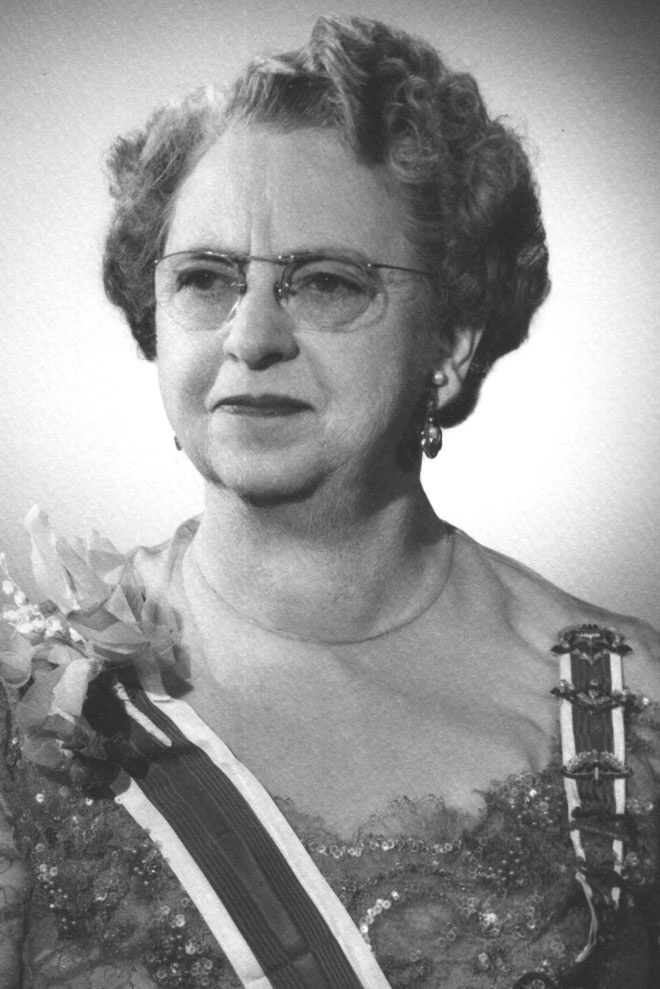
- Braerton in 1952

Colorado State Regent, Daughters of the American Revolution
- In office 1950–1953

Personal details
- Born: January 14, 1884 Council Grove, Kansas, U.S.
- Died: November 16, 1966 (aged 82) Santa Ana, California, U.S.
- Spouse: Warder Lee Braerton
- Children: 5
- Education: University of Kansas

Emily May Gibson Braerton (January 14, 1884 – November 16, 1966) was an American activist who was an early advocate of historic preservation in the western United States. She was the Vice President General for the National Society of the Daughters of the American Revolution (DAR) from 1950 to 1953 and remained an Honorary Vice President General until her death in Santa Ana, California in 1966. She was a member of the DAR's Peace Pipe Chapter and served as Colorado State Regent from 1950 to 1953.

== Early life and family ==
Braerton was born on January 14, 1884, in Council Grove, Kansas, to Albert Eugene Gibson (Tiffin, Ohio 1851–1909) and Lillian Griffith (Tiffin, Ohio 1851–1939). She was the great niece of William Harvey Gibson, the "Silver Tongued Orator" and Union Army Brigadier General from Ohio. She was a direct descendant of Colonel John Gibson, a U.S. Revolutionary officer and of Robert Coe, who arrived in Boston in 1634. She attended the University of Kansas in 1902–1903.

== Activism and civic work ==
During Braerton's tenure as national vice president, the DAR worked to redress denying Marian Anderson the right to perform at DAR Constitution Hall in 1939. On 14 March 1953, Anderson sang to an unsegregated audience in DAR Constitution Hall as part of the American University concert series. This performance was repeated at DAR Constitution Hall on 1 April 1956. On 24 October 1964, Anderson began her farewell American tour from DAR Constitution Hall.

Braerton was particularly supportive of issues concerning the disabled.

== Personal life and death ==
She was married to Warder Lee Braerton, a law graduate of the University of Kansas (1903) and partner in Braerton, Simonton & Brown Insurance based in Denver, Colorado. Braerton had five daughters: Emily Louise, Lillian Joan, Mary Lee, Susan Frances, and Lucy Jean, one of whom died in infancy and another one suffered from cerebral palsy caused by premature birth.

She died in Orange County, California, in 1966.
