= Cassius M. Coe =

American newspaper proprietor (1855–1901)

Cassius M. Coe (April 16, 1855 — December 23, 1901) was an American journalist, newspaper editor and proprietor, and the president of the San Francisco Press Club. He owned and was the editor of the San Francisco Examiner; founded The Nome Gold Digger, co-founded two newspapers in Colorado, and was the editor of the Victoria Times.

Coe was born was in Dalton, Ohio, to Jonathan and Mary Ann née Weaver Coe. He is a direct descendent of American colonial Robert Coe. He grew up in Des Moines, Iowa. In his youth, Coe moved to Colorado from Iowa, interested in reporting on the bustling Ten Mile mining district in Summit County, including the ghost towns of Kokomo and Robinson. There he co-founded the The Summit County Times and Robinson Republican with Benjamin Macready, a well-known mining expert, operating as Coe & Macready. In 1882, they sold The Times to a stock company, which the Daily Journal in Breckenridge referred to as "a mess." They also said that Coe and Macready were "scamps" who endeavored to make everyone in the town their enemy. Coe and Macready also co-owned Buckeye State mine on Sugarloaf Mountain. Coe and Macready then moved to Tacoma, Washington, where Macready was elected Pierce County treasurer and Coe reported for The Tacoma Daily Ledger, and other Seattle-area publications. In 1885, Coe relocated to Victoria, British Columbia, where he assumed the role of editor of the Victoria Times.

Coe later moved south to Oregon, where he reported for The Oregonian and the Portland Evening Telegram, followed by California, where he settled in San Francisco, initially working as a hotel reporter at the San Francisco Examiner. In 1889, he brought the work of an English writer to the editor of the Examiner, insisting he publish it. The editor refused the manuscript. The author was Rudyard Kipling, who later became a famous writer and Nobel Laureate. Coe became the editor and owner of the Examiner. and reporting for the The San Francisco Chronicle and The San Francisco Call. At The Call, he met fellow journalist Marie Evelyn née Lister, who had emigrated from England, and the two became engaged. Lister was one of the earliest female reporters in American journalism. She wrote under the name "Evelyn Marie" at the The Morning Call under the editorship of Samuel M. Shortridge. She also was a playwright.

In 1897, Coe took a position as a correspondent with The Call in New York City. Lister followed soon after, and the two were married. While in New York, Coe reported for the New-York Tribune and The Sun. A couple of years later, in 1899, Coe and his wife moved to the mining town of Nome, Alaska, where he founded The Nome Gold Digger. The publication was one of two newspapers which played a role in taking the town from a mining camp to a civilized community. By December of 1900, Coe became critically ill with pneumonia.

In the spring of 1901, Coe and his wife travelled to Yuma, Arizona, with several other California-based newspaper editors where he hoped to recover in a dryer climate. While in Yuma, he worked on a special assignment for the Arizona Sentinel. By early August, they relocated to Denver, and then to Colorado Springs, Colorado, to seek medical care. He died there in December that same year from tuberculosis. Lister kept the news of his death suppressed to allow the Examiner to scoop the story. She died on August 25, 1931, in California.
