= Elizabeth French Bartlett =

Elizabeth French Bartlett (27 January 1877-24 October 1961) was an American genealogist.

== Career ==
In 1908, Bartlett joined the New England Historic Genealogical Society's Committee on English Research. In 1920, Bartlett was elected as a member of the Cambridge Historical Society. In her lifetime, she was also a member of the Historical Society of Pennsylvania and the British Record Society. In her research, she specialized on American immigrants from England; the New England Historic Genealogical Society wrote that she amassed a valuable collection of research "regarding English Homes of American Settlers (hitherto unknown), including Brackett, Cheney, Child, Eggleston, Frost, Gridley, Grover, Kingsbury, Mellowes, Newcomb, Patten, Potter, Rouse, Sikes, Vinal..." She contributed the English-background research for Eleanor D. Crosby's genealogical volume Simon Crosby The Emigrant: His English Ancestry and Some of His American Descendants, for which more contemporary researcher Eugene Aubrey Stratton called her "highly respected."

== Personal life ==
Bartlett was married to fellow American genealogist J. Gardner Bartlett around 1917. They had no children.
