= Joseph Coe =

Joseph Coe (November 12, 1784 – October 17, 1854) was a leader in the early days of the Latter-day Saint movement.

Coe was born in Cayuga County, New York, to Joel and Huldah Coe (née Horton), one of six children, including his brother Nathaniel, who settled the Hood River Valley. His grandfather was deacon and Connecticut Colony settler Joseph Coe. They are descendants of colonial Robert Coe who immigrated during Puritan migration to New England. In 1831, while living in Macedon, New York, he joined the newly established Church of Christ, led by Joseph Smith. He was ordained an elder and moved his family to Kirtland, Ohio to join the main gathering of Latter-day Saints. In 1831 he served short missions to New York and Missouri.

In August 1831, Coe was one of the individuals who assisted Smith in laying the cornerstones for the temple at the Temple Lot in Independence, Missouri. Coe was ordained a high priest of the Latter Day Saints by Smith on October 1, 1831, and in 1834 he became one of the twelve inaugural members of the presiding high council in Kirtland; he was a member of the high council until 1837. In 1835, Coe provided $800 of the $2400 used by the church to purchase some mummies and papyri which Smith used to produce the Book of Abraham.

After the collapse of the Kirtland Safety Society, Coe became one of the Latter-day Saint dissenters. He was 'cut off' from the church by the high council in December 1837 and was formally excommunicated in December 1838. Coe lived the rest of his life in Kirtland and did not associate with any Latter-day Saint group after his excommunication.

Coe died in Kirtland when he was trampled by his bull on his farm. He was buried in the Kirtland North Cemetery.
