= Frontier gambler =

19th century American frontier stock character

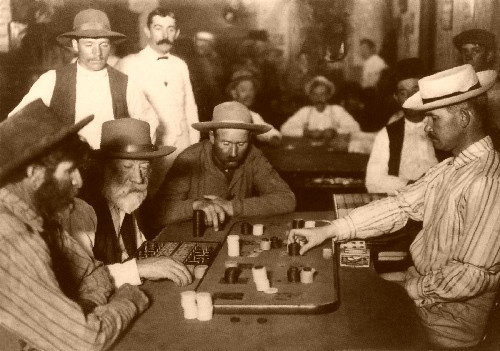
A faro game in a Tombstone, Arizona Territory saloon.

The frontier gambler is one of the most recognizable stock characters of the 19th century American frontier. Historically, gamblers were of both sexes, came from a variety of professions, social classes, and geographical backgrounds, were of many nationalities, and were part of a well-respected profession. As the Western United States became increasingly populated and domesticated, the public perception of gambling changed to a negative one and led nearly all of the state and territorial legislatures to pass anti-gambling laws in and effort to "clean up" their towns. The gambler continues to be a captivating figure in the imagery of the west, representing the openness of its society and invoking its association with risk-taking.

== History ==
The heyday of gambling in the West lasted from 1850-1910. Gambling was the number one form of entertainment in the west and nearly everyone living there engaged in it at one time or another. Cowboys, miners, lumberjacks, businessmen, and lawmen all played games of chance for pleasure and profit. Whenever a new settlement or camp started one of the first buildings or tents erected would be a gambling hall. As the settlement grew, these halls would become larger and more elaborate in proportion. Gambling halls were typically the largest and most ornately decorated buildings in any town and often housed a bar, stage for entertainment, and hotel rooms for guests. These establishments were a driving force behind the local economy and many towns measured their prosperity by the number of gambling halls and professional gamblers they had. Towns that were friendly to gambling were typically known to sports as "wide-awake" or "wide-open" for their acceptance of gambling.

Most western citizens considered gambling to be a respectable profession and those who chose to make a living doing it, were respected members of society. "Gambling was not only the principal and best paying industry of the town at the time, but it was also reckoned among its most respectable," wrote Bat Masterson in 1907. Professional gamblers ran their own games by renting a table at a gambling house and banking it with their own money. Because of this, many professional gamblers settled in one place. In order to be successful as an established businessman, a gambler needed to cultivate a reputation for fairness and running a straight game. These men were known as 'sports'. They did not drink, cheat, or swear. They paid rent and licensing fees, encouraged customers to run up bar tabs and did their best to act as, Historian Hubert Hoover Bancroft put it, "Reputable and respectable merchants."

Bancroft distinguishes between three types of professional gamblers: the 'free-floating professional', the 'established legit' and the 'recreational gentleman'.

The California Gold Rush of 1849 created one of the largest draws for migrant gamblers and San Francisco soon became the gambling hotspot of the west. Famous gambling houses included the Parker House, Samuel Dennison's Exchange, and the El Dorado Gambling Saloon. Portsmouth Square was famous for the many houses that clustered closely around it.

Gambling was also popular in the many mining camps throughout California and the southwest. Gambling was so closely associated with the Gold Rush that the overland route to California that passed through Panama became known as the "Gambler's Route." Dealers lay in wait everywhere, and it is said that many an expedition to the gold fields ended in camp before it even began. Mining towns outside of California developed large-scale gambling as well. Deadwood, Silver City, and Tombstone were all as well known for their many gambling halls and saloons as they were for their rich mineral deposits.

Cattle towns in Texas, Oklahoma, Kansas, and Nebraska became centers of gambling as well. Thanks to the railroad and cattle industries, a great number of people worked in and around these towns and had plenty of money to wager. Abilene, Dodge City, Wichita, Omaha, and Kansas City all had an atmosphere that was convivial to gaming. Not surprisingly, such an atmosphere also invited trouble and such towns also developed reputations as lawless and dangerous places.

=== Women gamblers ===
Men were not the only ones who played at games of chance. Women placed their bets as well and the sight of petticoats at the table was normal. Many women played, dealt or ran their own houses. This choice of profession offered them the opportunity to attain monetary independence and social stature. One of the most famous was Eleanore Dumont, known more crudely in her later years as "Madame Mustache". Miss Dumont ran several different houses throughout her career in Nevada, Idaho, Montana, and South Dakota. Another, Alice Ives, started gambling after the death of her husband. Known more popularly as Poker Alice, she was a popularly recognized figure in the west for her nearly forty-year-long career. Kitty LeRoy made use of her sex appeal and flamboyant personality as well as great gambling ability to become a force of nature in Deadwood. She had multiple husbands and did not hesitate to get rid of men once she tired of them. Perhaps they were lucky because Kitty also had a reputation for shooting men as well.

=== Race ===
Many nationalities and races were represented by frontier gamblers. Especially in California during the gold rush, prospectors came from all over the world in search of gold and naturally played games of chance. This included Mexicans, Chinese, Australians, and Peruvians. Anglo migrants to areas of the southwest with pre-established Mexican populations discovered gambling there waiting for them. Most towns had at least one or two gambling houses. One of the most popular games, Monte, originated in Mexico and was adopted and later modified into three card monte. The Chinese were avid gamblers who brought a variety of games with them to North America, including Fan Tan and several different lottery variants. Chinatown in San Francisco contained a great number of gambling houses and was a popular destination for those seeking to play.

=== Games ===
Gamblers preferred fast-paced games allowed them an opportunity to turn a profit quickly. Faro was the most popular game of the time and was known as the "King of all games." It was not the only game people played, and monte, Vingt-et-Un (twenty-one), roulette, chuck-a-luck were all popular ways to take a risk. Poker was not initially popular because of its slow pace but gradually increased in popularity as time went on. Not all games required playing cards. Dice games such as craps were common as were games involving a wheeled device, such as roulette or hazard. Saloons and gaming tables were not the only places to bet however, and westerners had a well-deserved reputation of being willing to bet on anything. Horse races became an enormously popular means of wagering, and foot races and boxing matches provided a similar opportunity. Fights between animals were popular as well; cockfighting, dogfights, or even a panther vs. bear battle.

== In popular culture ==
The popular stereotype of the frontier gambler presents a tall, thin male wearing a mustache. He is well groomed and wears a tailored suit, usually of black. Usually having a southern background, the frontier gambler is presented as a gentlemen in manner and custom and is concerned with maintaining his honor. The gambler possesses a calm demeanor and is cool under pressure, but when crossed instantly becomes a cold-blooded killer.

Gambling and gamblers are featured in many, many western books, movies, and TV programs and this high occurrence reflects the ubiquity of the activity in western society. The high frequency of these scenes reveal the close association between the west and gambling that continues today, an association just as strong as that of the west with cowboys or lawmen. Gambling is a convenient plot device; it may be used in the background, a setting for character discussion, or the motivation behind the plot. For example, scenes depicting high-stakes card games or gunfights over those games are so common as to be cliché.

The persistent presence of gambling in western mythology shows a strong association with the risk-taking and chance that were involved both in coming to the west and in everyday life there. In a sense, those who chose to leave their lives and come west were taking a huge gamble just to begin with. Gambling is also strongly associated with extralegal activity and to have that activity practiced so frequently suggests a popular association of the west with a state of lax legal and moral codes.

== Notable figures and places ==
- Bat Masterson
- Pat Garrett
- Doc Holliday
- Lottie Deno
- Luke Short
- Poker Alice
- Soapy Smith
- Wild Bill Hickok
- Wyatt Earp
- Kitty Leroy
- Billy the Kid
- Shang Stanton
- Ben Thompsen
- Charles Cora
- James McCabe
- Deadwood
- Denver
- Dodge City
- San Francisco
- Ingalls
- Kansas City
- Tombstone
- Skagway
- El Paso
- Abilene

== See also ==
- Blackjack
- Dead man's hand
