= George Coe (Michigan politician) =

American politician (1811–1869)

11th Lieutenant Governor of Michigan
- In office 1855–1859
- Governor: Kinsley S. Bingham
- Preceded by: George Griswold
- Succeeded by: Edmund Burke Fairfield

Member of the Michigan Senate
- In office 1846–1847
- Constituency: 4th district (1846); 3rd district (1847)

Member of the Michigan House of Representatives from the Branch County district
- In office 1849–1849 Serving with Oliver C. Comstock
- Preceded by: Alvarado Brown and Benjamin F. Ferris
- Succeeded by: Oliver D. Colvin and Roland Root

Personal details
- Born: August 16, 1811 Rush, New York
- Died: October 21, 1869 (aged 58) Coldwater, Michigan
- Resting place: Oak Grove Cemetery; Coldwater, Michigan
- Party: Whig; Republican
- Relatives: Descendants of Robert Coe

George Alonzo Coe (August 16, 1811 – October 21, 1869) was an American politician from the U.S. state of Michigan. He served as the 11th lieutenant governor of Michigan.

== Early life ==
Coe was born in Rush, New York and moved to Illinois at a young age. He was raised on his father's farm until the age of fourteen and then attended school and taught school. He studied law with Judge Pratt in Rochester, New York and began the practice of law in Coldwater, Michigan in 1839. In 1856, Coe became a law partner with future Congressman Charles Upson.

== Political career ==
Coe held various political positions in Michigan, and was elected as a Whig candidate to the Michigan House of Representatives in 1840. In 1846 he was elected to the Michigan Senate to represent the 4th District, and in 1847 he was elected to the State Senate to represent the 3rd District. Coe was elected as the first Republican to serve as the 11th Lieutenant Governor of Michigan. He served as Lieutenant Governor from 1855 to 1859 under Michigan Governor Kinsley Bingham.

Coe was also a delegate to the 1856 Republican National Convention from Michigan, which nominated John C. Fremont for U. S. President, however Fremont lost to James Buchanan in the general election. Coe left office in 1859 at the age of fifty-eight, and resumed his legal practice.

He died in Coldwater, Michigan on October 21, 1869, ten years after leaving office. He is interred in Oak Grove Cemetery in Coldwater.

Political offices
Preceded by George Griswold	Lieutenant Governor of Michigan; 1855–1859	Succeeded by Edmund B. Fairfield
