= Clarence Clinton Coe =

American politician

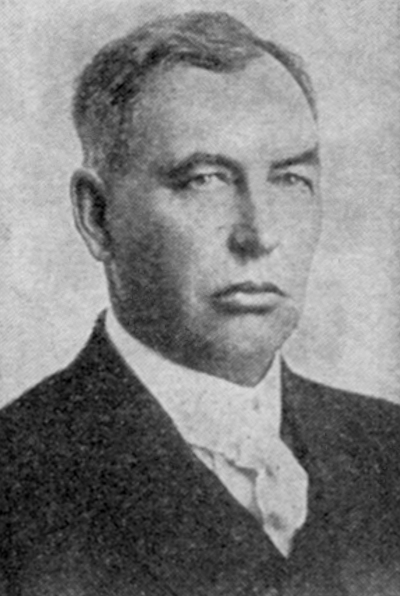
- Born: January 4, 1864; Sterling, Illinois, US
- Died: April 29, 1936 (aged 72); Barron, Wisconsin, US
- Relatives: Descendants of Robert Coe

Clarence Clinton Coe (January 4, 1864 – April 29, 1936) was a member of the Wisconsin State Assembly.

== Biography ==
Coe was born on January 4, 1864 in Sterling, Illinois. In 1884, he graduated from high school in Sterling, and moved to Barron, Wisconsin. Later, Coe graduated from the University of Wisconsin Law School in 1888. That year, he married Claudia Mae Smith. His cousin, Jerome, was a municipal judge and his brother, Arthur, was a school board member. Coe and his family were members of the Methodist Episcopal Church. He died on in Barron April 29, 1936.

== Career ==
Coe was elected to the Assembly in 1918 and was defeated for re-election in 1920. Previously, he had been District Attorney of Barron County, Wisconsin, from 1889 to 1891 and a municipal judge from 1892 to 1900. He was appointed municipal judge again in 1928. He was a Republican.
