= Coe, Indiana =

Unincorporated community in Indiana, United States

- Unincorporated community
- Location within Indiana Location within the United States
- Coordinates: 38°18′23″N 87°15′29″W
- Country: United States
- State: Indiana
- County: Pike
- Township: Monroe
- Elevation: 489 ft (149 m)
- Time zone: UTC-5 (Eastern (EST))
  - Summer (DST): UTC-4 (EDT)
- ZIP code: 47598
- Area code: 812
- GNIS feature ID: 449045

Coe is an unincorporated community in Monroe Township, Pike County, in the U.S. state of Indiana.

== History ==
Coe was originally called Arcadia, and under the latter name was laid out in 1869.

A post office was established at Coe in 1896, and remained in operation until it was discontinued in 1907.
