= Coe Glacier =

Glacier in Oregon, U.S.

- Location within Oregon
- Type: Mountain glacier
- Location: Cascade Range, Hood River County, Oregon, U.S.
- Coordinates: 45°23′00″N 121°41′40″W
- Area: 296 acres (120 ha) (2004 estimate)
- Terminus: Moraines/Talus
- Status: Retreating

Coe Glacier is in the U.S. state of Oregon. The glacier is situated in the Cascade Range on the north slope of Mount Hood, at an elevation between 10,500 and 6,400 ft (3,200 and 2,000 m). It was named after Henry C. Coe.

Between 1907 and 2004, Coe Glacier lost 15% of its surface area. The glacier terminus retreated 390 metres (1,280 ft) over the same time period.

== See also ==
- List of glaciers in the United States
