= Coe Township, Rock Island County, Illinois =

Coordinates: 41°37′05″N 90°16′05″W

Coe Township
- Township
- Location in Rock Island County

- Rock Island County's location in Illinois
- Country: United States
- State: Illinois
- County: Rock Island
- Established: January 1858

Area
  - Total: 35.88 sq mi (92.9 km^{2})
  - Land: 35.87 sq mi (92.9 km^{2})
  - Water: 0.01 sq mi (0.026 km^{2}) 0.03%

Population (2010)
  - Estimate (2016): 1,638
- Time zone: UTC-6 (CST)
  - Summer (DST): UTC-5 (CDT)
- FIPS code: 17-161-15326

Coe Township is located in Rock Island County, Illinois. As of the 2010 census, its population was 1,657 and it contained 659 housing units. Coe Township originally was named Fremont Township, but changed its name to Penn Township on October 1, 1857. Then changed its name from Penn to Coe in January, 1858.

== Geography ==
According to the 2010 census, the township has a total area of 35.88 square miles (92.9 km^{2}), of which 35.87 square miles (92.9 km^{2}) (or 99.97%) is land and 0.01 square miles (0.026 km^{2}) (or 0.03%) is water.

== Demographics ==
Historical population
Census	Pop.	Note	%±
2016 (est.)	1,638
U.S. Decennial Census
