= Osgood Johnson =

American educator

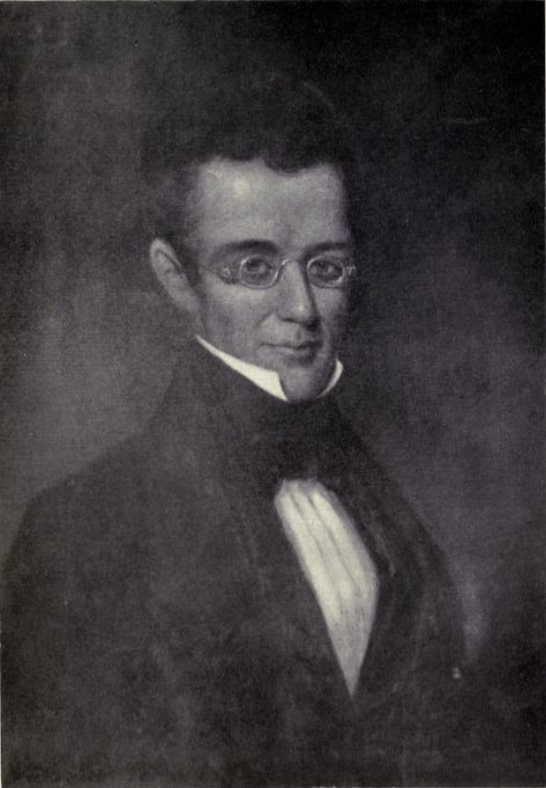

5th Principal of Phillips Academy
- In office 1833–1837
- Preceded by: John Adams
- Succeeded by: Samuel Harvey Taylor

Personal details
- Born: Osgood Johnson; September 9, 1803 Andover, Massachusetts, US
- Died: May 9, 1837 (aged 33) Andover, Massachusetts, US
- Resting place: Chapel Cemetery, Phillips Academy, Andover, Massachusetts, US
- Spouse: Lucretia Bly (m. 1829)
- Children: Frances Elizabeth (b. 1830); Osgood (b. 1831); James Henry (b. 1833); Lucretia Osgood (b. 1835); Alfred Osgood (b. 1836)
- Parent(s): Osgood Johnson; Fanney Abbot
- Education: Phillips Academy (1823); Dartmouth College (1828)

Osgood Johnson (September 9, 1803 – May 9, 1837) was an American educator and 5th Principal (Note: The contemporary name for the position is Head of School.) of Phillips Academy Andover from 1833 to 1837.

== Early life and family ==
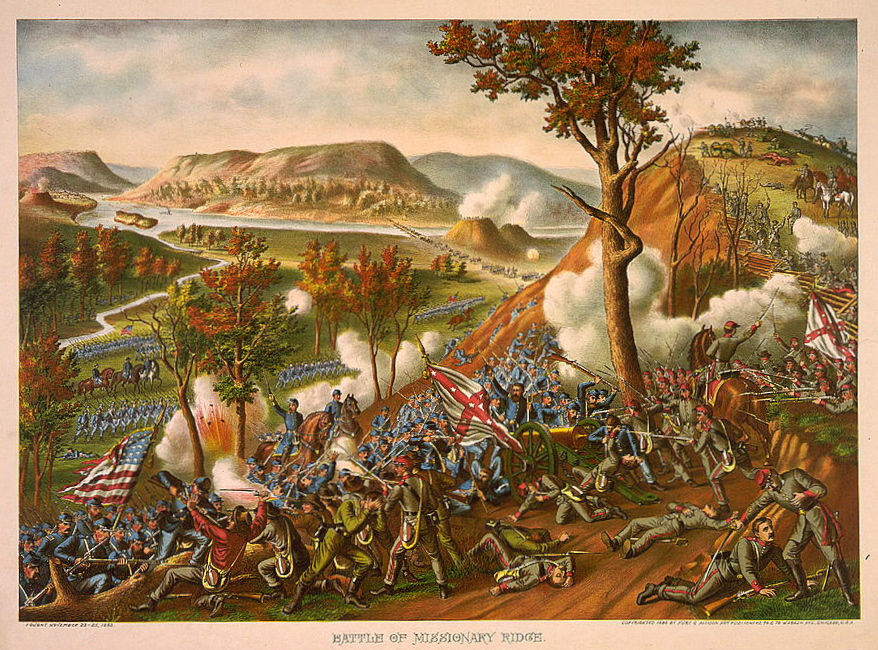
Johnson's son Alfred was mortally wounded at the Battle of Missionary Ridge November 25, 1863.

Johnson was born in the West Parish of Andover on September 9, 1803, to Osgood Johnson and Fanney Abbot. Johnson had two younger siblings. His grandfather, Jeduthan Abbot of Andover, was a sergeant during the Revolutionary War, serving in the Saratoga Campaign under General John Burgoyne in Captain Joshua Holt's company at the Lexington Alarm. Johnson became "hopefully possessed of personal piety" and joined the South Church of Andover in January 1821 by letter. He attended Phillips Academy, graduating in 1823. He continued his studies at Dartmouth College, graduating in 1828 summa cum laude.

He married Lucretia Bly of Hanover, New Hampshire on July 9, 1829. Together they had five children, three sons and two daughters:

1. Frances Elizabeth (May 17, 1830 – February 25, 1845) died young of typhus fever.
2. Osgood (July 31, 1831 – April 14, 1857) was a minister by trade and principal of Woburn Academy from 1852 to 1853, Worcester High School from 1855 to 1856, and Cambridge High School from 1856 until his death. He attended Phillips Academy and Dartmouth College, graduating in 1852. He entered the Andover Theological Seminary in 1853 and left in 1855 without graduating.
3. James Henry (June 3, 1833 – February 10, 1885) married Sarah Elizabeth Elanor Jones in 1854.
4. Lucretia Osgood (January 30, 1835 – March 13, 1886) married William Burnet Wright, (Note: Rev. William Burnet Wright (April 15, 1838 – 1924) was a Presbyterian clergyman. He was born in Cincinnati to Hon. Nathaniel Wright and Caroline Augusta Rachel Thew where he worked as a railroad clerk. He graduated from Dartmouth College in 1857 with a D.D. and the Andover Theological Seminary in 1860 studying divinity. Afterwards he matriculated at University of Berlin, Prussia in November 1860 and the Martin Luther University of Halle-Wittenberg, Halle in March 1861, only to leave July 1861 to travel Europe. He returned to the United States in June 1862. He was pastor of the South Congregational Church in Chicago, ordained December 2, 1862, Berkeley Street Church in Boston, Lafayette Avenue Church in Buffalo, New York, and First Church in New Britain, Connecticut. His publications include: Ancient Cities from the Dawn to the Daylight (1887); The World to Come (1887); Master and Men (1894); The Sermon on the Mountain Practiced on the Plain (1898); Cities of Paul (1905); and The Heart of the Master (1911).) of Cincinnati, in Baltimore on January 1, 1863.
5. Alfred Osgood (October 16, 1836 – December 8, 1863) was an Army Lieutenant mortally wounded while leading a charge at the Battle of Missionary Ridge, Tennessee November 25, 1863, during the American Civil War.

After Johnson died in 1837, Lucretia Bly continued to live in Samaritan House (see image), taking care of students as well as allowing many to board there.

== Career ==
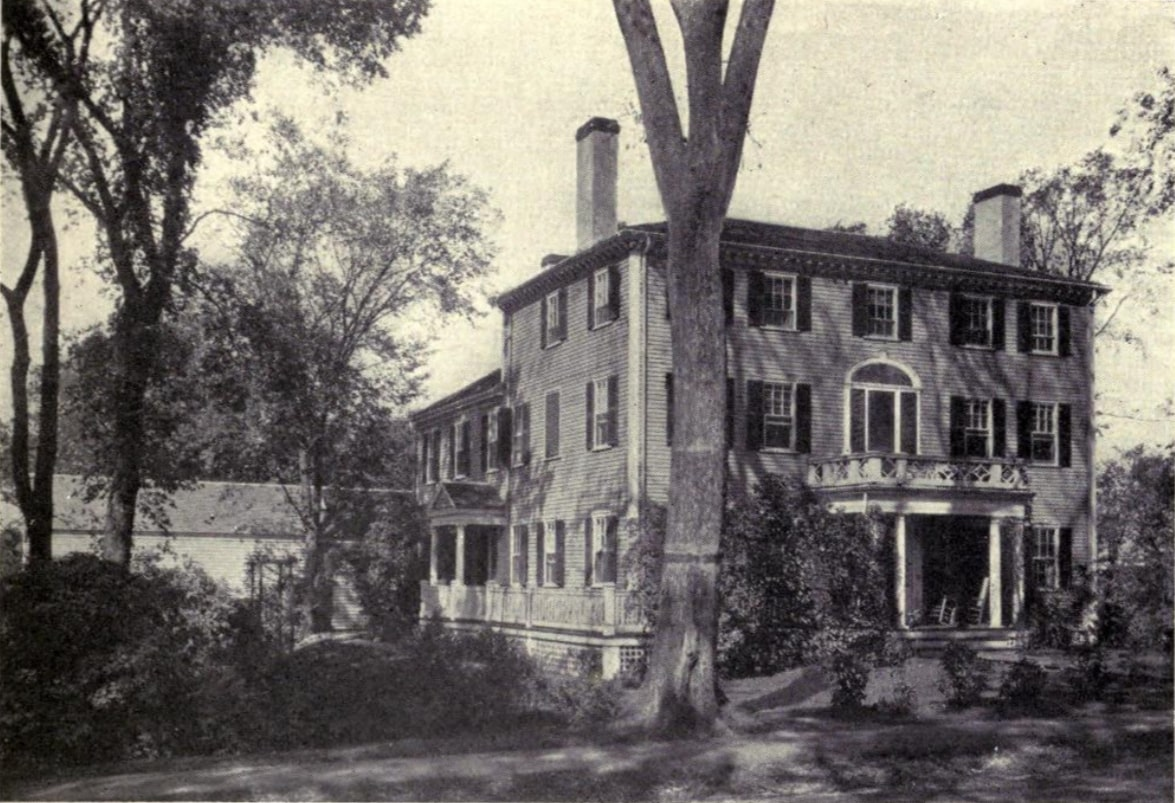
Samaritan House, home of Johnson while Principal at Phillips Academy

After graduating from Dartmouth College in 1828, he remained in Hanover as a tutor at Moor's Charity School, a part of Dartmouth. A year later in 1829 he took on an assistant teaching role under then Principal John Adams at Phillips Academy. Over the next couple of years Adams would come to depend on Johnson for his "extraordinary gifts as a teacher". In 1831 Johnson and his family moved into Samaritan House, then on Chapel Avenue on campus.

Upon Adams' resignation on November 22, 1832, he requested Johnson take his place. Johnson became acting Principal until January 1, 1833, when he was given a permanent position. He officially took office when he accepted in a letter to the Trustees dated March 20, 1833. The Trustees were looking for someone young and progressive, and the thirty year old Johnson was the person they were looking for. Thus from this point he would begin his brief term, entrusted in modernizing and reforming the school.

Despite the wishes of the Trustees, very little changed under Johnson. He was satisfied with the current academic curriculum and administrative procedures and was by no means an innovator. In the first year of his administration the school dealt with financial issues and debated whether the cost for teachers and assistants should be paid separately by the school or taken out of Johnson's salary. Samuel Farrar Esq., Treasurer of the Board of Trustees, proposed the latter as well as a plan to encourage more paying students and increase the size of the student body. Johnson fought Squire Farrar's plans, deeming them unjust and dangerous. In addition, he was according to others "too honest to resort to unscrupulous methods in enlarging the school." On April 28, 1834, the Trustees resolved that Johnson would simply earn $1000 each year, essentially abandoning Farrar's plan. Since then Principals have not held the responsibility to deal with financial matters.

As a teacher Johnson varied greatly from his predecessors. He was kind, gentle, and rarely resorted to harshness or corporal punishment. He was an efficient teacher, rarely bringing books to class as he had already memorized them beforehand. There are a number of accounts of his classes and teaching style from his former students and colleagues. Chiefly is the account by Oliver Wendell Holmes Sr. in his poem, The School-boy:

His was the charm magnetic, the bright look That sheds its sunshine on the dreariest book; A loving soul to every task he brought That sweetly mingled with the lore he taught; Sprung from a saintly race that never could From youth to age be anything but good, His few brief years in holiest labors spent, Earth lost too soon the treasure heaven had lent.

Another comes from Isaac P. Langworthy, a former student of Johnson's and founding President of the student-run Society of Inquiry on his teaching style:

As a teacher, I never knew one more thorough, lucid, patient, or inspiring. I never saw him disconcerted. He was always self -poised, awake to every emergency; and having full command of his varied and broad resources, he could meet every exigency incident to his responsible position with most admirable tact and skill....When he became Principal, he at once began the gradual elevation of the standard of scholarship, keeping it abreast, if not in advance, of the best Academies in the country.

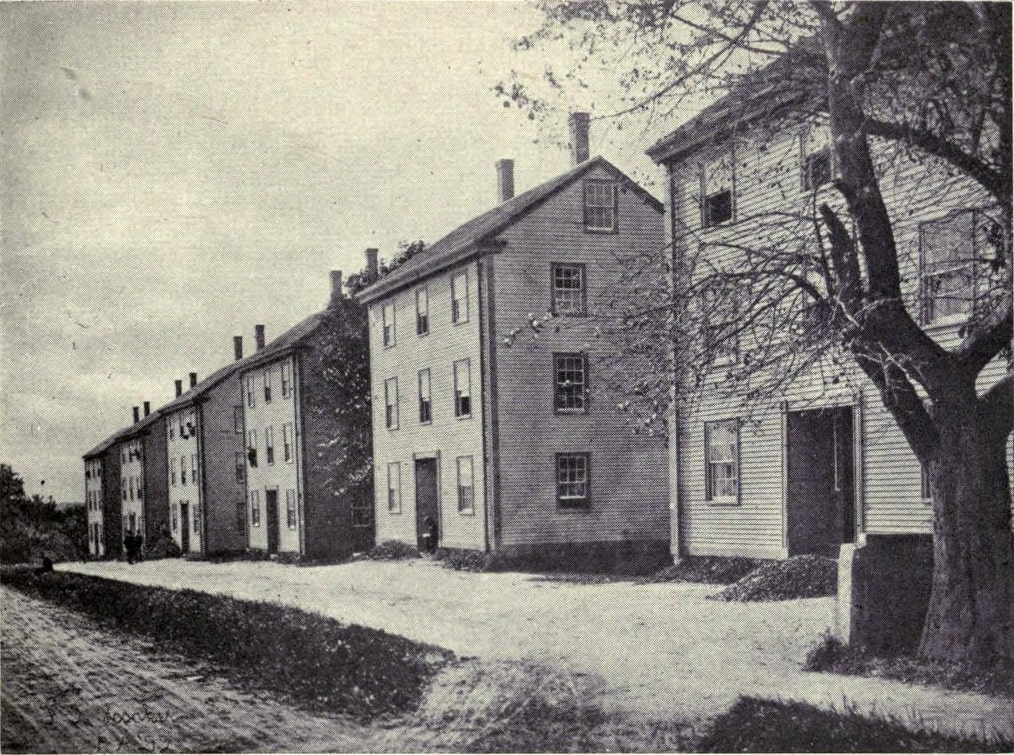
Latin Commons on Phillips Street

After the establishment of William Lloyd Garrison's Liberator slavery became a heated issue in New England and as a result in 1835, the "Anti-Slavery Rebellion" rose in popularity, including among Phillips Academy students. Teachers at the Andover Theological Seminary as well as Johnson who opposed abolition, banned anti-slavery societies, their reason being "such organizations would bring odium on the institutions, and keep away Southern students." Despite warnings students went off campus to listen to anti-slavery talks, known as "theologues" or "cads", including ones by English anti-slavery orators Sir Robert Peel and George Thompson, and Garrison himself, who visited Andover during lecture tours of Massachusetts. Tens of students gathered in July 1835 on Indian Ridge to discuss the formation of an anti-slavery society, and multiple times their requests were denied by Johnson. At the height of the conflict, fifty students in rebellion dismissed themselves from the school in a letter to Johnson. Of the fifty most were no longer minors and sufficiently prepared to enter college.

During the same time the first dormitories on campus, known as the "Latin Commons" were completed and occupied for the first time. Before that time non-local students primarily lived off-campus with host families. They were simple, wooden, utilitarian buildings, lined in a single row, costing about $1500 each. A similar parallel "English Commons" was completed in 1836 for the Teachers' Seminary about a quarter mile to the north. The method and speed by which students could travel to Phillips Academy also changed drastically during Johnson's administration. On August 6, 1836, crowds gathered to witness the first train to travel on the newly constructed railroad through Andover by the Andover and Wilmington Company. The line is currently operated by the Boston and Maine Railroad. Prior to its construction, students either walked or rode by horseback, sometimes hundreds of miles. The railroad broadened the reach of the school and increased access to more students.

== Decline and death ==
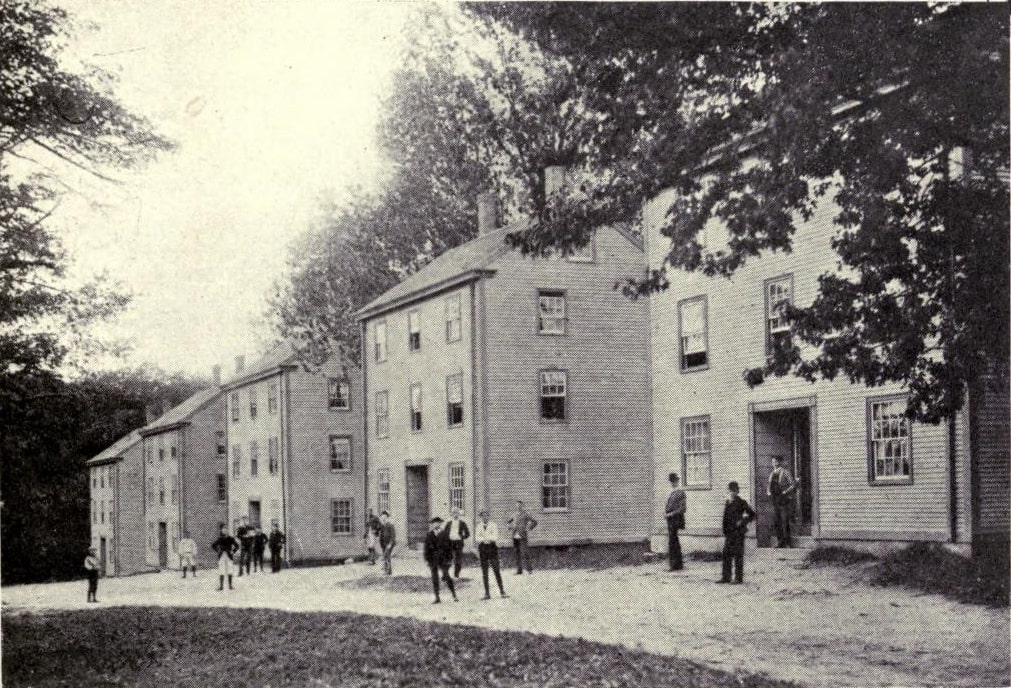
English Commons

Johnson had for a great portion of his life been in a state of poor health. He had a clubfoot which impaired his movement as well as signs of tuberculosis, often becoming tired. As his health declined while Principal, he instructed fewer class and took on fewer administrative duties. Rev. Dr. John P. Gulliver, a teacher, described his figure and state of health:

I first saw Johnson while, slowly and limpingly, he was making his way from the door of the old Brick Academy down to his chaise. His pallid face, surmounted by a dome-like brow, with his large spectacles and a peculiar spiritual expression, gave me the impression, to a degree I never got from any other man, that what I saw was not the man, but that his real self was out of sight, behind those glasses, and that white, placid face, and that great coat and muffler which he wore. He had a club-foot also, which struck the sidewalk with a thud at every step, and alternately raised and depressed his form as he walked. The tout ensemble made a great impression on my boyish imagination. His infirmities added to his dignity, and the whole effect of his appearance was to inspire the idea that some supernatural being had been born lame, like Vulcan, and unjustly cast down from Olympus.

Johnson considered resigning in the Fall of 1836, but students and colleagues urged him otherwise. Students even carried Johnson to the classroom. Finally in 1837 he was forced to remain in bed. During this time William Augustus Peabody, a student at the Theological Seminary, served as Acting Principal. On April 17, Johnson resigned. His final action was to request Samuel Harvey Taylor succeed him. On May 9, 1837, he died of pulmonary tuberculosis. He was buried in the Phillips Academy Cemetery and a monument in his name was constructed "at the expense of his students." The stone bore a commemorative inscription composed by Professor James L. Kingsley, of Yale College.

At the time of his death Johnson was one of foremost classical scholars of his time. Historians speculate whether he would have had a greater impact on the school if he lived longer.

== Bibliography ==
- Abbot, Abiel; Abbot, Ephraim (1847). A Genealogical Register of the Descendants of George Abbot, of Andover. Boston: James Munroe and Company.
- Allis, Frederick Scouller Jr. (1979). Youth From Every Quarter: A Bicentennial History of Phillips Academy, Andover. Andover: Phillips Academy. ISBN 978-0-87451-157-4.
- Alpha Delta Phi (1899). Catalogue of the Alpha Delta Phi. New York: The Executive Council of the Alpha Delta Phi Fraternity.
- Andover Theological Seminary (1908). Carpenter, Charles Carroll (ed.). General Catalogue of the Theological Seminary, Andover, Massachusetts. Boston: Andover Theological Seminary.
- Bailey, Sarah Loring (1880). Historical Sketches of Andover, (comprising the present towns of North Andover and Andover). Boston: Houghton, Mifflin and Company.
- Carpenter, Charles Carroll (1903). Biographical Catalogue of the Trustees, Teachers and Students of Phillips Academy Andover 1778-1830. Andover: The Andover Press. hdl:2027/njp.32101013921109.
- Chapman, George Thomas (1867). Sketches of the Alumni of Dartmouth College: From the First Graduation in 1771 to the Present Time, with a Brief History of the Institution. Cambridge: Riverside Press.
- Daughters of the American Revolution (1912). Bassett, Mary Cooley; Johnston, Sarah Hall (eds.). Lineage Book. Vol. 33. Washington, D.C.: National Society of the Daughters of the American Revolution.
- Derby, George; White, James Terry (1900). The National Cyclopædia of American Biography. Vol. 10. New York: James T. White & Company.
- Edwards, B. B.; Cogswell, W. (1838). The American Quarterly Register. Vol. 10. Boston: American Education Society.
- Fuess, Claude Moore (1917). An Old New England School: A History of Phillips Academy Andover. Boston: Houghton Mifflin Company.
- Garrison, William Lloyd (1981). Merrill, Walter McIntosh; Ruchames, Louis (eds.). The Letters of William Lloyd Garrison. Vol. 6. Cambridge: Belknap Press of Harvard University Press. ISBN 978-0-674-52666-2.
- Leonard, John William; Marquis, Albert Nelson (1901). Who's Who in America. Vol. 2. New York: A. N. Marquis & Company.
- Livermore, Abiel Abbot; Putnam, Sewall (1888). History of the Town of Wilton, Hillsborough County, New Hampshire: With A Genealogical Register by Livermore and Putnam. Lowell: Marden & Rowell, Printers.
- Memorial Hall Library. "125 Dascomb Road". Andover Historic Preservation. Memorial Hall Library.
- Mooar, George (1859). Historical manual of the South church in Andover, Mass. Andover, MA: Warren F. Draper.
- Park, William E. (1878). The Earlier Annals of Phillips Academy. n.p.
- Schwarz, J. C., ed. (1937). Who's Who in Law. Vol. 1. New York: J. C. Schwarz.
- Topsfield Historical Society (1912a). Vital Records of Andover, Massachusetts, to the End of the Year 1849. Vol. 1. Topsfield, MA: Topsfield Historical Society.
- Topsfield Historical Society (1912b). Vital Records of Andover, Massachusetts, to the End of the Year 1849. Vol. 2. Topsfield, MA: Topsfield Historical Society.
- The Executive Committee of The National Council of the Congregational Churches of the United States (1924). The Congregational Yearbook. Vol. 47. New York: The National Council of Congregational Churches.
- Trustees of Phillips Academy. "John Palfrey P'21". Andover. Trustees of Phillips Academy. Archived from the original on November 26, 2018.

Academic offices
Preceded by John Adams	Principal of Phillips Academy; 1833–1837	Succeeded by Samuel Harvey Taylor
