= William B. Wright (disambiguation) =

William B. Wright (1806–1868) was a justice of the New York Supreme Court. William B. Wright may also refer to:

- William Bacon Wright (1830–1895), Confederate politician
- William Barton Wright (1828–1915), British railway engineer
- William Burnet Wright (1836–1924), Congregational clergyman from Ohio
