= Cecil Bancroft =

American educator (1839–1901)

Cecil F. P. Bancroft Ph.D
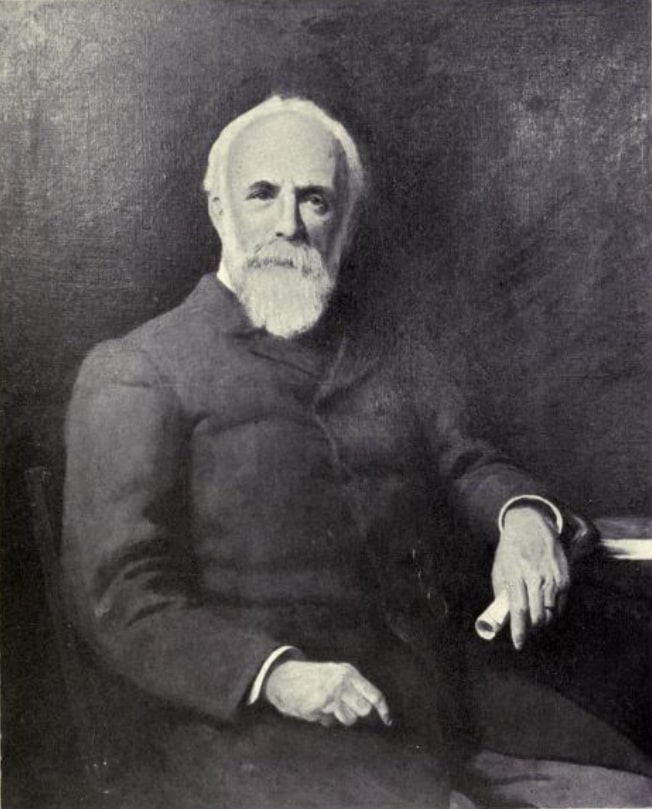

8th Principal of Phillips Academy
- In office 1873–1901
- Preceded by: Frederic W. Tilton
- Succeeded by: Alfred E. Stearns

Personal details
- Born: Cecil Franklin Patch Bancroft; November 25, 1839 New Ipswich, New Hampshire
- Died: October 4, 1901 (aged 61) Andover, Massachusetts
- Spouse: Frances A. Kittredge (m. 1867–1898)
- Parent(s): James Bancroft; Sarah Kendall
- Education: Dartmouth College, (1860); Andover Theological Seminary, (1867)

Cecil Franklin Patch Bancroft (born Cecil Bancroft; November 25, 1839 – October 4, 1901) was an American educator and 8th Principal (Note: The contemporary name for the position is Head of School.) of Phillips Academy in Andover, Massachusetts, from 1873 to 1901.

== Early life ==
Bancroft was born on November 25, 1839, in New Ipswich, New Hampshire, to James Bancroft and Sarah Kimball. At an early age he was cared for by Mr. and Mrs. Patch of Ashby, Massachusetts, the neighboring town. While not legally adopted, they named him Cecil Franklin Patch Bancroft, adding Franklin Patch after the son Mr. and Mrs. Patch had who recently died. He attended public schools in Ashby as well as the Appleton Academy in New Ipswich. He entered Dartmouth College in 1856 at the age of sixteen and graduated in 1860 near the top of his class.

Bancroft continued his education as he began his career in teaching. He took classes at the Union Theological Seminary in New York City during the 1864–65 academic year. While there he was a member of the United States Christian Commission, traveling to support soldiers during the Civil War. He then transferred to the Andover Theological Seminary where he would graduate in 1867.

== Career ==
After graduating from Dartmouth College in 1860, Bancroft became the principal of the Appleton Academy in Mont Vernon, New Hampshire. While principal he met his future wife, Frances A. Kittredge, one of his students. In 1867 he quit his job to marry Miss. Kittredge and move to Lookout Mountain, Tennessee, where he would become principal of the Lookout Mountain Educational Institution. The school ran out of funds in 1872 and the founder quit the project, leaving Bancroft unemployed. Thus he decided to take the next year abroad in Italy. A year later in Halle, Germany (probably Halle, Saxony-Anhalt) he received a cable message with an offer for principalship at Phillips Academy. He had the opportunity to stay in Italy but in reflection, he felt the choice to move was natural. During his time in Andover, he was offered a similar position at Pacific University in Forest Grove, Oregon, but declined.

=== Phillips Academy ===
Bancroft accepted an offer from the Trustees of Phillips Academy while in Italy and was officially named 8th Principal on May 17, 1873. He began his tenure later that year, arriving in Andover on July 31, 1873, living in Double Brick House. He came at a time of decline for the school. Funds were low, student enrollment was decreasing, and the school's reputation was falling. As Principal, he took advantage of the school's centennial celebration in 1878 to launch a campaign, reaching out to alumni, decedents of alumni and founders of the school, and others. Over the next two decades he brought about the creation of new buildings, increased the size of the faculty from eight to 22 and the student body from 237 to over 400, and added significantly to the endowment, all of which added to the quality of education. Bancroft was a trustee of Dartmouth College, the Andover Theological Seminary, the State Hospital at Tewksbury, and the State Farm at Bridgewater.

== Personal life ==
Bancroft married Frances A. Kittredge on May 6, 1867, in Mont Vernon. They met while Bancroft was principal the Appleton School and married soon after he resigned with plans to travel together to Lookout Mountain, Tennessee for Bancroft's new job. Together they had five children, three sons and two daughters, some of whom resided in New Haven and Stamford. Kittredge died on March 28, 1898, only three years before Bancroft. His nephew Alfred Stearns succeeded Bancroft as principal of Phillips Academy in 1903.

Bancroft was a member of the Andover Village Improvement Society. He worked to preserve the society's first piece of land, Indian Ridge, in the 1890s. Indian Ridge, a glacial esker, had already been partially excavated for gravel, but he believed the ridge should be preserved anyway to prevent further destruction. He convinced fellow society members such as Warren Draper to donate funds to purchase the twenty-three-acre property. In 1897, the land was permanently protected. Townspeople described Bancroft as "an enthusiast for the well-being of Andover".

== Bibliography ==
- Andover Theological Seminary Alumni Association (1902). Necrology. Boston: The Everett Press Company.
- Fuess, Claude Moore (1917). An Old New England School: A History of Phillips Academy Andover. Boston: Houghton Mifflin Company.
- Harvard Crimson (7 October 1901). "Death of Dr. Bancroft". The Harvard Crimson. Archived from the original on 27 November 2018.
- Johnson, Rossiter, ed. (1906). "Bancroft, Cecil Franklin Patch". The Biographical Dictionary of America. Vol. 1. Boston: American Biographical Society. p. 202.
- Lloyd, Susan McIntosh (1979). A Singular School: Abbot Academy 1828-1973. Andover, MA, Hanover, NH: Phillips Academy, The University Press of New England.
- Mofford, Juliet Haines (1980). AVIS: A History in Conservation. Andover, MA: Andover Village Improvement Society.
- Ohles, John F., ed. (1978). Biographical Dictionary of American Educators. Westport, Connecticut: Greenwood Press. ISBN 0313040125.
- Trustees of Phillips Academy. "John Palfrey P'21". Andover. Trustees of Phillips Academy. Archived from the original on 26 November 2018.

Academic offices
| Preceded by Frederic W. Tilton | Principal of Phillips Academy; 1873–1901 | Succeeded by Alfred Stearns |
