= Samuel Harvey Taylor =

American educator

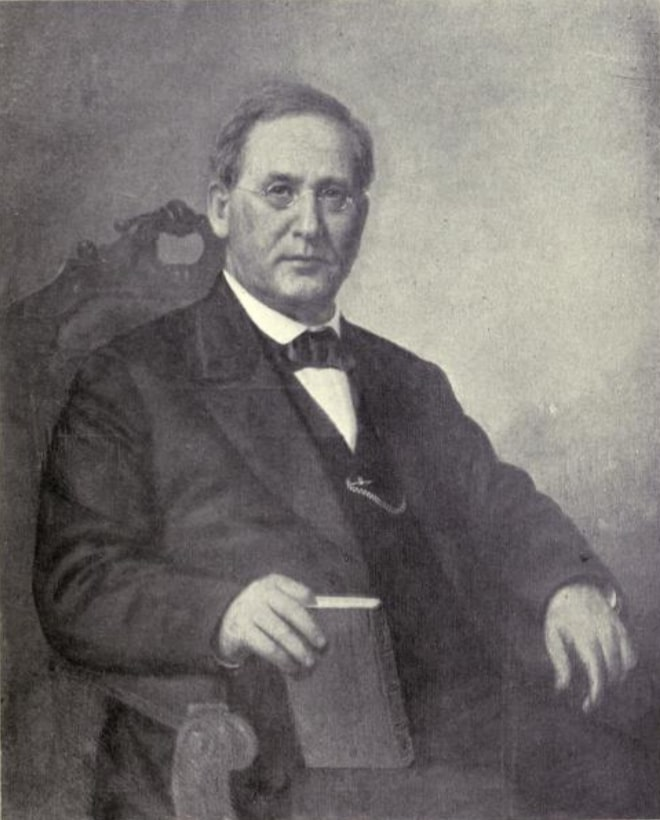

6th Principal of Phillips Academy
- In office 1837–1871
- Preceded by: Osgood Johnson
- Succeeded by: Frederic W. Tilton

Personal details
- Born: Samuel Harvey Taylor; October 3, 1807 Londonderry, New Hampshire, US
- Died: January 29, 1871 (aged 63) Andover, Massachusetts, US
- Resting place: Chapel Cemetery, Phillips Academy, Andover, Massachusetts, US
- Spouse: Caroline Persis Parker (m. 1837)
- Children: Charles Henry Taylor (b. 1856)
- Education: Dartmouth College (1832); Andover Theological Seminary (1837)

Samuel Harvey Taylor (October 3, 1807 – January 29, 1871) was an American educator and 6th Principal (Note: The contemporary name for the position is Head of School.) of Phillips Academy Andover from 1837 to 1871, the longest to hold the office to date.

== Early life ==
Taylor was born in Londonderry, New Hampshire, on October 3, 1807. His ancestors trace back to the founding of Londonderry, New Hampshire when sixteen families immigrated from Scotland, one of them Matthew Taylor. Taylor is named after a young hero during the siege of Londonderry, Ireland in 1688 and 1689.

From an early age he worked on his father's farm, but when he permanently injured himself after falling off a wagon, he began to grow an interest in books and pursuing an academic career. He began his study at Pinkerton Academy in Derry, New Hampshire, where he prepared for Dartmouth College, from which he graduated in 1832 with high honors. During the winter months at Dartmouth he taught at local district schools. He believed at the time he wanted to go into the ministry, so he entered the Andover Theological Seminary immediately after graduation. For brief periods of time Taylor would return to Dartmouth as a tutor. Taylor graduated from the Seminary in 1837, only months before he would accept the role as Principal of Phillips Academy.

== Phillips Academy ==
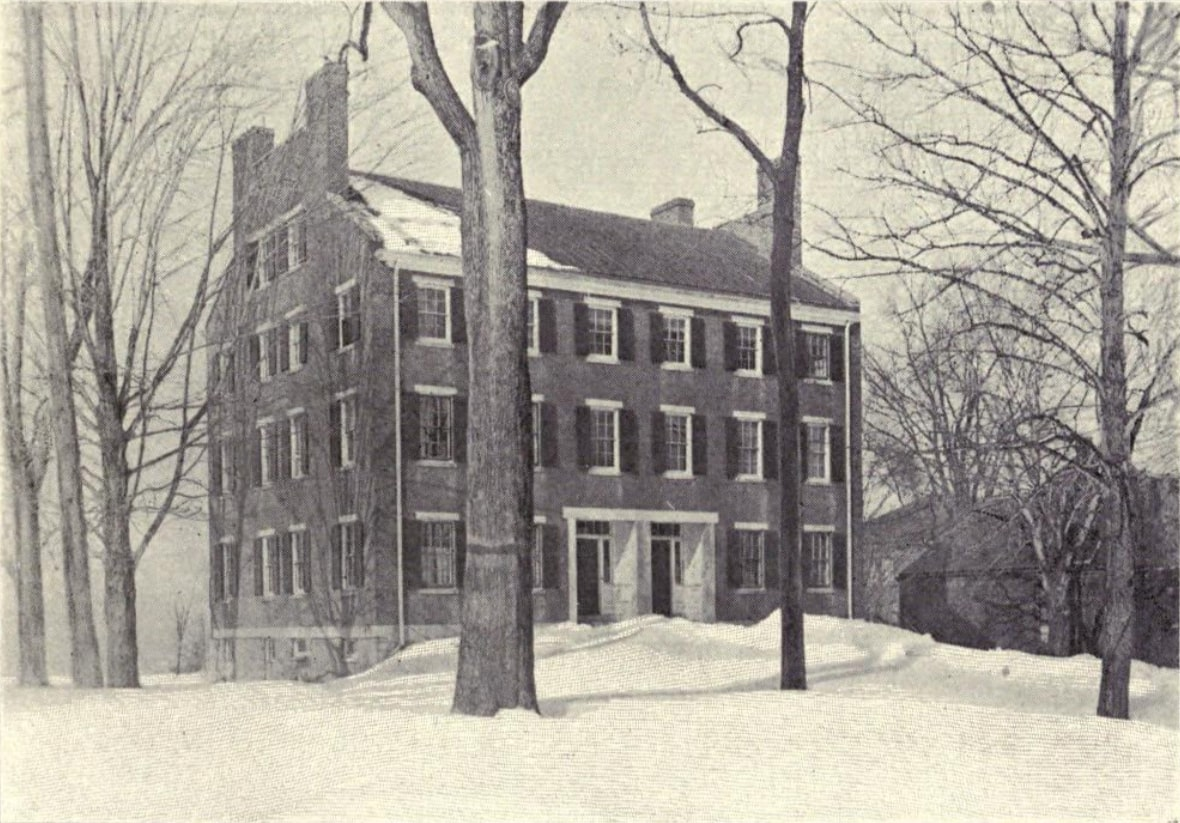
Double Brick House

While at the Andover Theological Seminary, Taylor met the current principal of the neighboring Phillips Academy, Osgood Johnson. Johnson had heard good things of Taylor from his Dartmouth professors and consequently urged him to accept a one-year assistant role at Phillips Academy in 1834, which he did. He was well liked, and unanimously asked to continue another year, which he also did. He was so well liked that upon Johnson's death in 1837, he requested Taylor succeed him. He received an enticing offer of $1000 a year with housing and could not decline. On July 25, 1837, he officially became the 6th Principal of Phillips Academy.

Taylor settled in the south half of Double Brick House while engaged to Caroline Parker, whom he would marry December 8, 1837. He was very busy his first years as he had no clerks or assistants to help him. He considered candidates for admission, assessed and made decisions on disciplinary cases, and taught classes, all while managing other administrative duties. He described himself in his first annual report:

"My time has been almost exclusively employed in the discharge of my duties in the Academy. I have spent between four and five hours of each day in the schoolroom. I have conducted the morning devotions, at which one-half hour is spent, and most of those in the evening. In addition to giving instruction to my regular classes, I have attended from time to time the recitations of the other classes, and have frequently heard these classes at my recitation room. This course has been taken that I might become better acquainted with the progress which each student was making in his studies. The examination of the different classes from time to time has given me an opportunity to point out to individuals in private any faults that might need correcting, as well as to apply the spur when it seemed to be necessary. Such a course requires much time, but I think it is attended with the happiest results."

Although perhaps overly hectic, he fulfilled his many tasks while still managing to make reforms to the school early in his career. He worked for three years after his appointment to update the curriculum, his solution in 1841 being in part a split of the student body into three classes: Senior, Middle, and Junior. He established a three-year course of study, focusing on Latin, Greek, and mathematics. He received criticism from colleagues because the curriculum failed to prepare students for college entrance exams, but chose to ignore their demands. He fought resistance from Harvard College, refusing to allow Andover students to attend Harvard if the college did not accept his graduation requirements. He highly encouraged students to attend Yale.

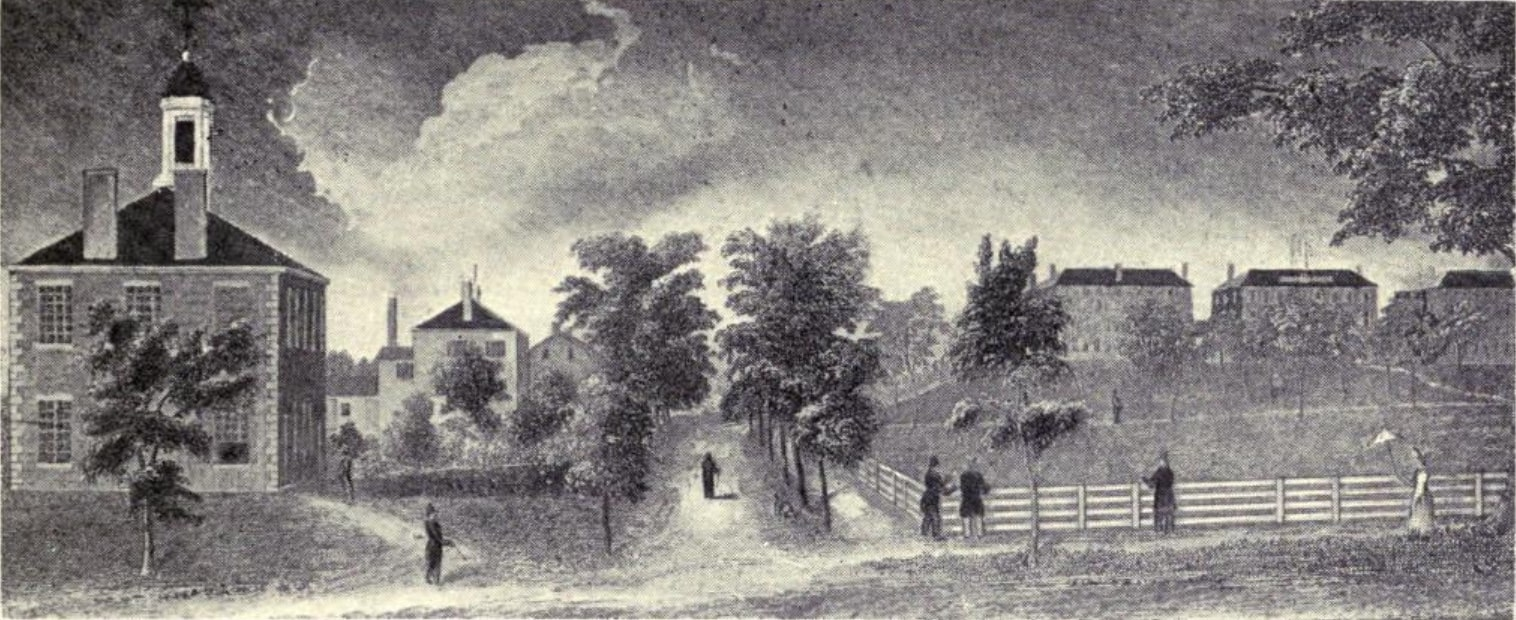
Phillips Academy and Theological Seminary, 1840

Taylor was known as a strict teacher. His style consisted of calling students at random to recite passages or an entire reading while questioning the student's understanding. He took on the nickname "Uncle Sam" and gained a reputation for being "dedicated to the classics" and "dictatorial in manner." According to one student in writing in 1850, he had no tolerance for tardiness and not knowing where to begin reading. Another former student Dr. Alexander McKenzie (Note: Dr. Alexander McKenzie (December 14, 1820 – ?) was a minister, author, and Pastor of the South Church in Augusta, Maine, and First Church in Cambridge, Congregational in Cambridge, Massachusetts. He was born to Daniel, a ship captain, and Phoebe McKenzie in New Bedford, Massachusetts. He graduated from Phillips Academy in 1855, continuing his study at Harvard College until 1859. He then returned to Andover to study at the Andover Theological Seminary, where he graduated in 1861 and afterwards ordained pastor of the South Church in Augusta. In January, 1867, he moved to Cambridge to become Pastor of the First Church in Cambridge, then on Mount Auburn Street. As pastor he authored a number of works including "Cambridge Sermons", "Some Things Abroad", "Christ Himself", and "A Door Opened". Outside of the ministry he held many offices, among them Trustee of Bowdoin College from 1866-1868, Trustee of Phillips Academy, President of the Board of Trustees at Wellesley College and the Hampton Institute, member of the Massachusetts Historical Society, member of the Cambridge School Committee from 1868-1874, and lecturer at the Andover Theological Seminary. He declined a professorship at the Seminary in 1894. He received an honorary degree from Amherst College in 1879. He married Ellen H. Eveleth on January 25, 1863, in Fitchburg and had two children, Kenneth McKenzie, a professor at Union College, and Margaret McKenzie.) wrote, "If I have ever seen anywhere any semblance of despotism and absolute monarchy, it was at Phillips Academy under Dr. Taylor." In a lot ways, his teaching style and philosophy closely resembled that of Phillips Academy's first Principal, Eliphalet Pearson.

Taylor is credited with growing the school in both size and breadth. The student body grew from 120 in 1837 to 228 in 1871 as well as the percent of those coming from outside New England from 15% (18 students) to 53% (123 students) respectively. During this time Phillips Academy also began having its first international and African American graduates, those being Joseph Hardy Neesima, Class of 1867, and Richard T. Greener, Class of 1865.

== Death ==
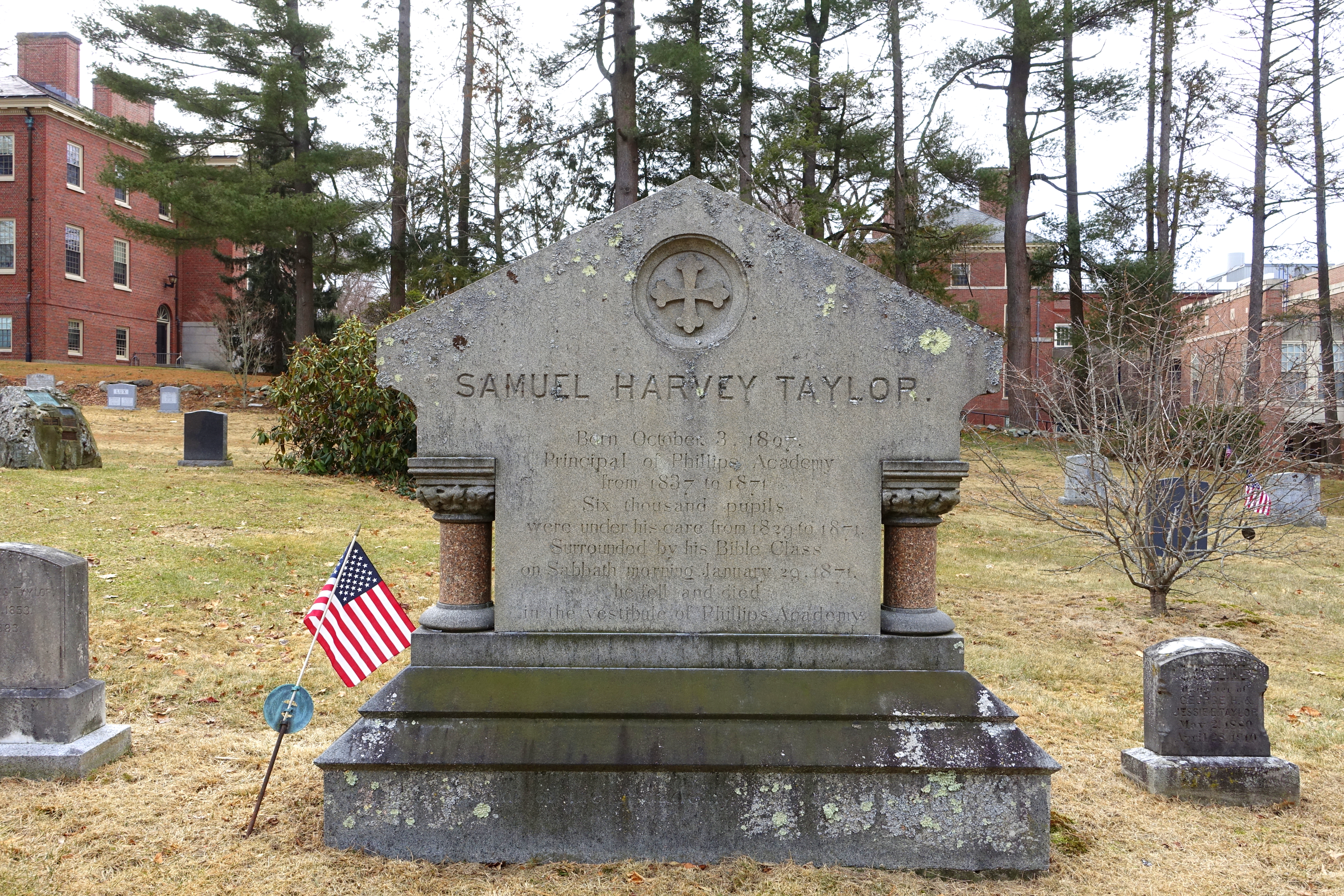
Memorial in Phillips Academy Cemetery

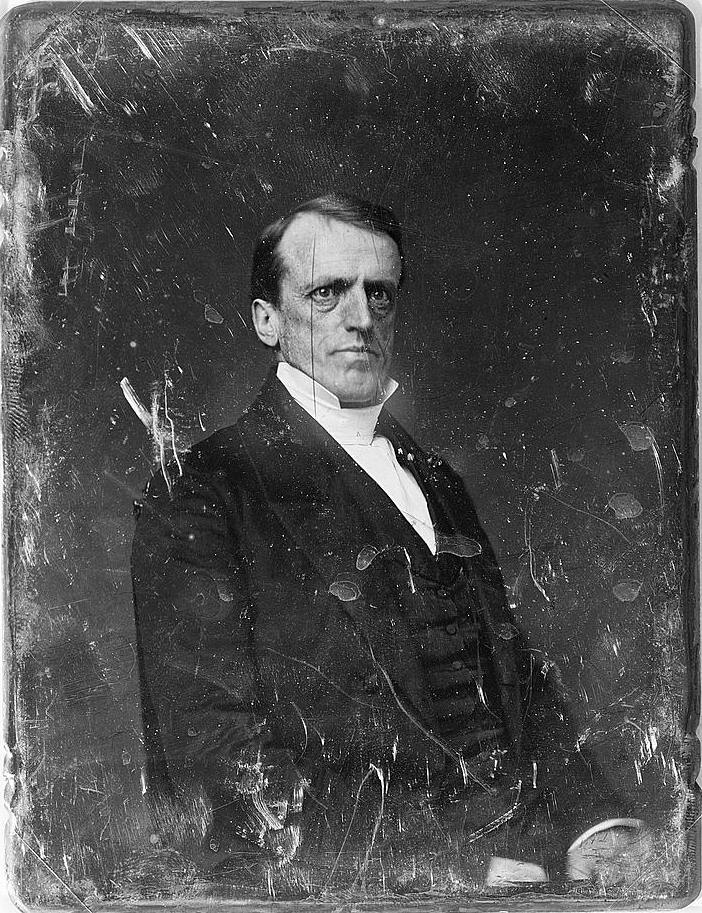
Edwards Amasa Park, a longtime colleague, authored an address given at Taylor's funeral.

Taylor's death was sudden and tragic to his students and those who knew him. On January 29, 1871, while preparing to teach a biblical exercise as students filed in, he fell when failing to grasp the stair railing and died about ten minutes thereafter in the arms of his son as students gathered around him. The cause of his sudden death was disputed by physicians at the time. Some believe he died of apoplexy, while others believe rheumatic heart disease was the culprit.

A funeral service took place on February 2 in the large hall of the main school building and was buried in the Phillips Academy Cemetery. The rear side of his tombstone reads:

"Bold, resolute firm,
strong in body and in mind,
he spake with authority.

His skill in letters;
his love for the wisdom of the ancients;
his veneration for law, order, duty;
his enterprising, vigilant and faithful life
made him a man of mark.

As an editor, and author,
versed in affairs
not less than various learning,
he won laurels
which he had laid at the feet of his Lord.

Hundreds of his pupils
paid him their tribute of gratitude
while he lived,
and made great lamentation over him
when he died."

On February 27, the senior class voted unanimously to publish a memorial of their late Principal, assigning a committee of five to conduct research and compile the volume: H. S. Van Duzer, C. F. Cutter, Charles Isham, C. F. Thwing, and F. C. S. Bartlett. Included in the memorial is an address by Edwards Amasa Park, a selection of scriptures read by John L. Taylor, and a Sermon by John Wesley Churchill as well as an account of Taylor's death and funeral service.

== Publications ==
Taylor authored several works during his teaching career, some co-authored with colleagues and/or translated from other editions. The majority of them served as textbooks for his students. The following is a complete list:

- Guide for Writing Latin (1843), translated from the German edition by John Phillip Krebs.
- Grammar of the Greek Language (1844), co-authored with Professor Bela B. Edwards of the Andover Theological Seminary, based on the manual of Dr. Raphael Kühner.
- Elementary Greek Grammar (1846), also based on one of Kühner's manuals.
- Methods of Classical Study (1861)
- A Memorial of Joseph P. Fairbanks (1865)
- Classical Study; Its Value Illustrated by Extracts from the Writings of Eminent Scholars (1870)

== Bibliography ==
- Allis, Frederick Scouller Jr. (1979). Youth From Every Quarter: A Bicentennial History of Phillips Academy, Andover. Andover: Phillips Academy. ISBN 978-0-87451-157-4.
- Cambridge Chronicle (12 March 1898). "Rev. Alexander McKenzie, D.D.: Pastor First Church in Cambridge". Cambridge Chronicle.
- Chaddock, Catherine Reynolds (2017). Uncompromising Activist: Richard Greener, First Black Graduate of Harvard College. Baltimore: JHU Press. ISBN 978-1-4214-2329-6.
- Fuess, Claude Moore (1917). An Old New England School: A History of Phillips Academy Andover. Boston: Houghton Mifflin Company.
- Park, Edwards Amasa; Churchill, John Wesley (1871). A Memorial of Samuel Harvey Taylor. Andover: Warren F. Draper.
- Trustees of Phillips Academy. "John Palfrey P'21". Andover. Trustees of Phillips Academy. Archived from the original on 26 November 2018.

Academic offices
Preceded by Osgood Johnson	Principal of Phillips Academy; 1837–1871	Succeeded by Frederic W. Tilton
