= Mark Newman (educator) =

American educator

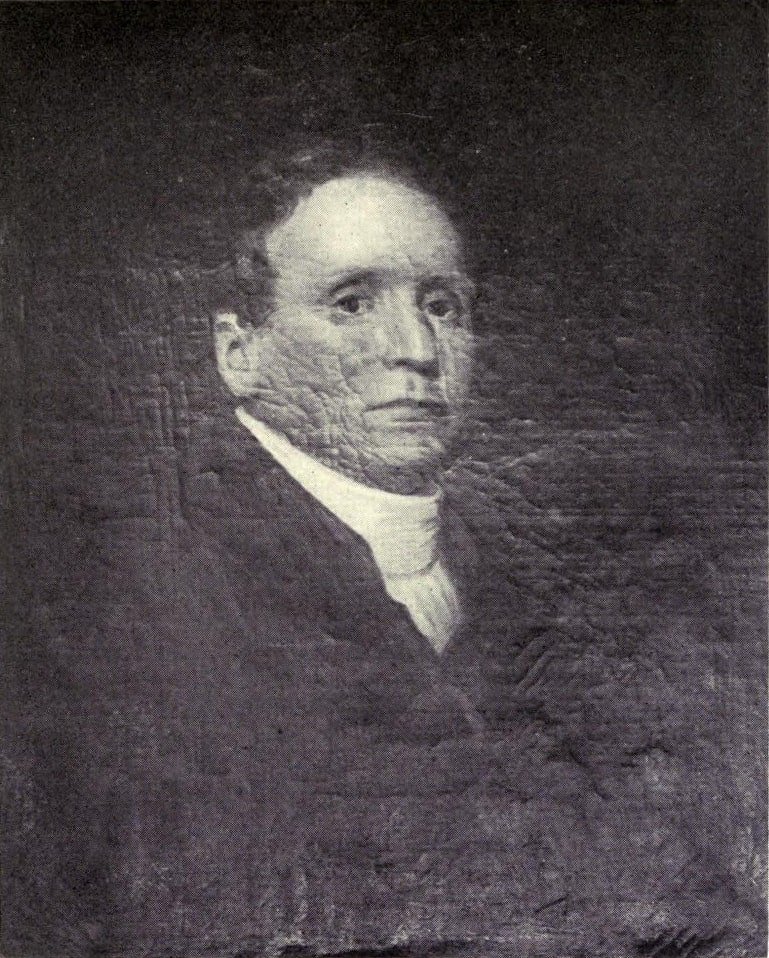

3rd Principal of Phillips Academy
- In office 1795–1809
- Preceded by: Ebenezer Pemberton
- Succeeded by: John Adams

Deacon of the South Church, Andover, Massachusetts
- In office April 2, 1811 – January 3, 1845

Personal details
- Born: Mark Newman; September 7, 1772 Ipswich, Massachusetts Bay Colony, British America
- Died: June 15, 1859 (aged 86) Andover, Massachusetts
- Resting place: South Church Cemetery, Andover, MA
- Spouse(s): Sarah Phillips (m. 1795; died 1811) Abigail Larkin Dodge (m. 1814)
- Children: 7
- Education: Phillips Exeter Academy; Dartmouth College (1793)

Mark Newman (September 7, 1772 – June 15, 1859) was an American educator, deacon, and publisher and 3rd Principal (Note: The contemporary name for the position is Head of School.) of Phillips Academy Andover from 1795 to 1809. While he is known primarily for his work at Phillips Academy, the majority of his career was spent as a publisher and bookseller in the same town.

== Early life and family ==
Mark Newman was born into a relatively poor family in Ipswich, Massachusetts, on September 7, 1772. At an early age, he caught the attention of the pastor of the First Church in Ipswich, Rev. Levi Frisbie, as someone of note. Thus, under the care of the pastor, Newman was sent to Phillips Exeter Academy. Newman was a charity student, or in other words, on financial aid, funded by the Academy's founder, John Phillips. In his spare time, he worked for Phillips in his home. After graduating from Exeter, he attended Dartmouth College per Phillips' suggestion, graduating in 1793.

His parents were Samuel Newman and Hannah Haskell.

== Career ==
=== Phillips Academy ===
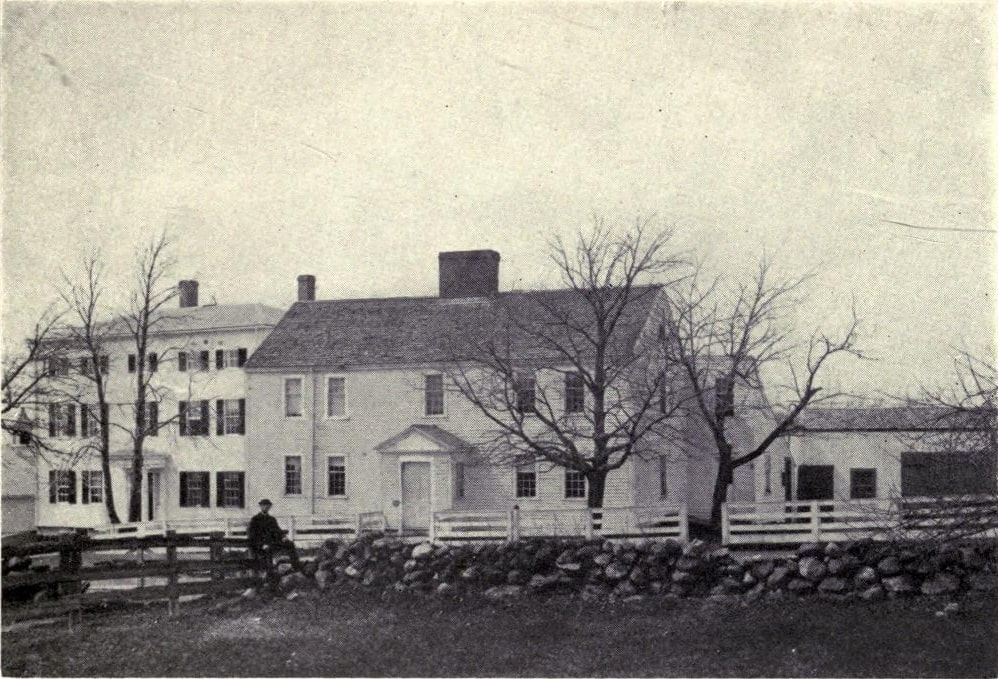
The Old Abbot House, home of Mark Newman while Principal of Phillips Academy

Almost immediately after graduating from Dartmouth in 1793, Newman returned to Andover on July 5 to take on an assistant teaching role. There he built a relationship with the Phillips family, especially John Phillips, who helped him secure the principalship in 1795, shortly after his marriage to Sally Phillips. He moved into the old Abbot House on Phillips Street, where his predecessor Pemberton had recently left. As Principal, he addressed discipline, along with the Trustees of the school. In his first year, students broke windows, resulting in the firing of the instructor Ichabod Johnson. For unknown reasons only described as "prevalent disorder", the school closed for four weeks beginning February 10, 1796. In 1797 a committee was formed to address discipline and in 1798 Newman established a militia company composed of students and young boys in the town as a reward for demonstrating good character. In 1805 a student drowned in the Shawsheen River and measures had to be taken to find a new summer bathing location.

The school's resources grew and secured more funding. The Trustees installed additional seating in the Academy Building in 1799 and added amenities such as window blinds and a clock in 1804. The small school library, founded by Newman in 1796, received more shelf space in 1805. No new buildings were built in that time, however, and the school had changed little since its founding in 1778. Samuel Phillips, the founder, made two later gifts, the first of $1000 in 1801 and the second in 1802 of $4000 as a bequest to fund school textbooks and assist people in the town of Andover, including female teachers and poor Christians. Eight of President George Washington's nephews and grandnephews attended Phillips Academy during this time.

Despite the support, the school was in decline. In 1803 the school had 57 pupils but by 1809 only had 18. He was described as "shy and sensitive" and a man who did not "command the confidence of parents". With this in mind, he resigned on August 22, 1809. He did not disassociate himself from Phillips Academy. He was immediately appointed a trustee after the death of Jonathan French, a role he would keep until 1836. He was also president of the board of trustees of Abbot Academy, the neighboring female school, from its founding in 1829 to 1843. He was very involved in the new school's establishment, moderating meetings in response to its proposal in 1828, leading the effort in the construction of its first building, and donating the one-acre parcel it originally sat on.

=== Deacon ===
Newman became a member of the South Church in Andover in 1802 and was their deacon from 1811 to 1845. In 1818 he became the first superintendent of the church's Sunday school. Furthermore, he was a moderator in 1818 and 1833 and treasurer from 1811 to 1827. He also worked for a church in West Newbury, but continued to live in Andover. He also held connections with the First Church in Ipswich.

=== Publishing company ===
Newman established a bookstore and publishing house in Andover shortly after the founding of the Andover Theological Seminary in 1808 to provide textbooks to its students, mostly of religious nature. No longer the principal of Phillips Academy, bookselling was his primary occupation for the remainder of his career. In 1818 he moved his business from the area around Phillips Academy to downtown Andover, increasing business. There he constructed a new brick building which would later be occupied by the publisher Warren Draper.

== Personal life ==
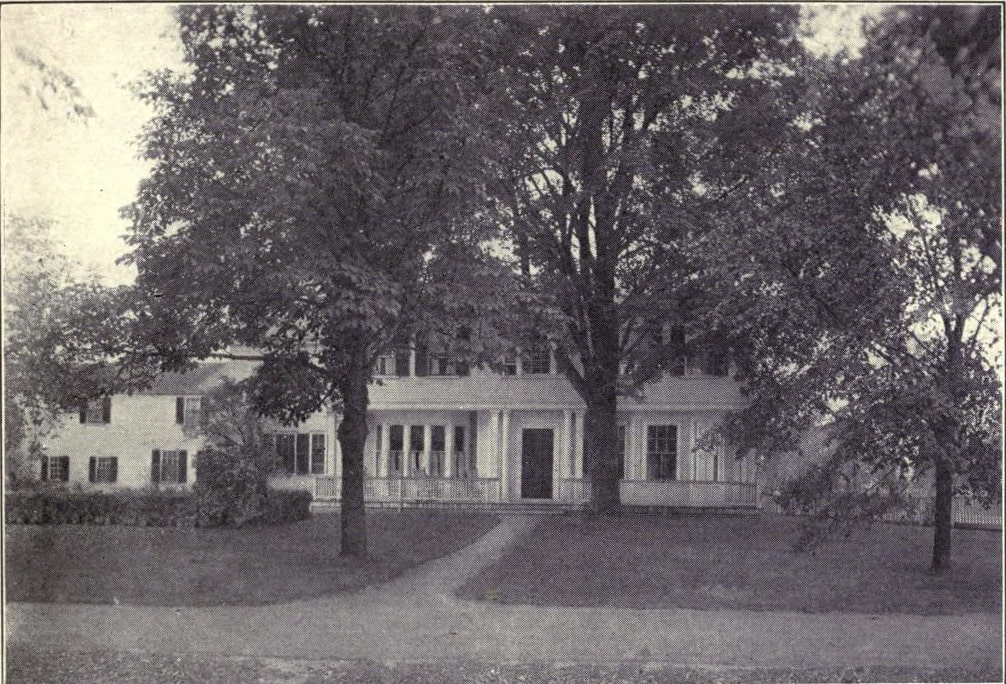
Newman House, Andover, Massachusetts. He built this home in 1811.

Newman pursued a career spanning fifty years after resigning as principal of Phillips Academy. Afterward, he built and moved into a house adjacent to the school. This residence still bears his name today. Met with financial troubles, be moved in 1818 to a house on Central Street closer to the South Church. He moved his publishing business the same year. In 1812 he along with Rev. Justin Edwards, pastor of the South Church and Rev. Ebenezer Porter of the Andover Theological Seminary founded the New England Tract Society (later merged to form the American Tract Society).

He remained healthy up to his death. He attended the celebration of the fiftieth anniversary of the Andover Theological Seminary in 1859. He died on June 15, 1859, in his home. Rev. George Mooar, then pastor of the South Church, delivered a funeral sermon which would be published titled The Enduring and Varying Beauty of a Good Man's Life. He is buried in the South Church cemetery.

=== Marriage and children ===
Newman married Sarah (also known as Sally) Phillips, daughter of John Phillips, on September 29, 1795, in Boston. Together they had seven children, listed below.

1. Prof. Samuel Phillips Newman (June 6, 1797 – February 10, 1842) was an author and professor at Bowdoin College. He graduated from Harvard College in 1816 and continued his studies in Lexington, Kentucky, with a private instructor and at the Andover Theological Seminary. He tutored at Bowdoin starting 1818 and was appointed Professor of Ancient Languages in 1819. In 1824 he became the Chair of Rhetoric and Oratory and soon after published his best known work, his treatise on Rhetoric. In 1839 he resigned from his professorship to become the principal of the newly established State Normal School in Barre, Massachusetts. In 1842 he quit due to poor health and returned to Andover where he would pass away the same year. Other work includes a textbook on political economy. He married Caroline Kent, daughter of Col. William Austin Kent, of Concord, New Hampshire, in 1821 and had five daughters.
2. Margaret Wendell Newman (born March 3, 1801)
3. Sarah Phillips Newman (March 19, 1802 – November 22, 1827)
4. Mark Newman (July 13, 1804 – September 10, 1805) died young.
5. Mark Haskell Newman (June 9, 1806 – December 21, 1851) was a publisher based in New York. His business, Newman & Ivison, was located at 199 Broadway and dealt primarily with books related to Christianity. He attended Phillips Academy and subsequently Bowdoin College, graduating with honors in 1825. He married Mary Dickinson of Amherst, Massachusetts, on September 13, 1828. (Note: Intention to marry)
6. Hannah H. Newman (June 6, 1809 – November 25, 1889) married Rev. Samuel Austin Fay (November 19, 1809 – December 19, 1842) of Northborough, Massachusetts, and later Barre, Massachusetts, on September 26, 1833. They had one daughter, Anne.
7. Rev. William John Newman (October 26, 1811 – March 5, 1850) was pastor of a church in Stratham, New Hampshire. He was a student of Divinity at Yale College and graduated in 1834. He married Caroline S. Cooper of Cooper, Maine, on October 24, 1836. (Note: Intention to marry) He died in York, Maine.

Sarah died November 18, 1811. Newman married Abigail Larkin Dodge, of Tamworth, New Hampshire, on October 21, 1814. (Note: Intention to marry) They had one daughter together, Anna Dodge Newman (April 1, 1816 – March 19, 1840), who died at the age of 23.

== Bibliography ==
- Allis, Frederick Scouller Jr. (1979). Youth From Every Quarter: A Bicentennial History of Phillips Academy, Andover. Andover: Phillips Academy. ISBN 978-0-87451-157-4.
- Bailey, Sarah Loring (1880). Historical Sketches of Andover, Massachusetts. Boston: Houghton, Mifflin and Company.
- Bowdoin College (1894). General Catalogue of Bowdoin College and the Medical School of Maine. Brunswick, ME: Bowdoin College.
- Carpenter, Charles C. (1903). Biographical Catalogue of the Trustees, Teachers and Students of Phillips Academy Andover, 1778-1830. Andover, MA: The Andover Press.
- Clark, Joseph S.; Dexter, Henry M.; Quint, Alonzo H.; Langworthy, Isaac P. (1860). The Congregational Quarterly. Vol. 2. Boston: Congregational Building, Chauncy Street.
- Cleaveland, Nehemiah (1882). History of Bowdoin College. Boston: James Ripley Osgood, and Company.
- Domingue, Robert A. (1990). "VIII: The Southeast Quadrant - The Athletic Area". Phillips Academy Andover, Massachusetts: An Illustrated History of the Property (Including Abbot Academy). Wilmington, MA: The Hampshire Press. ISBN 978-0962072628. Archived from the original on 21 December 2018.
- Fay, Orlin Prentice (1898). Fay Genealogy: John Fay of Marlborough and His Descendants. Cleveland, OH: Higginson Book Company. ISBN 9780598972743.
- Fuess, Claude Moore (1917). An Old New England School: A History of Phillips Academy Andover. Boston: Houghton Mifflin Company.
- Makepeace, F. B. (April 1886). An Illustrious Town, - Andover. Boston: Bay State Monthly Company.
- Mooar, George (1859). Historical Manual of the South Church in Andover, Mass. Andover, MA: Warren F. Draper.
- Putnam, George P. (February 17, 1866). "Sketches of the Publishers". The Round Table. No. 24.
- Registry Department of the City of Boston (1903). A Volume of Records Related to the Early History of Boston, Containing Boston Marriages from 1752 to 1809. Boston: Municipal Printing Office.
- Topsfield Historical Society (1912). Vital Records of Andover Massachusetts to the End of the Year 1849: Volume I and II. Topsfield, MA: Topsfield Historical Society.
- Trustees of Phillips Academy. "John Palfrey P'21". Andover. Trustees of Phillips Academy. Archived from the original on 26 November 2018.
- Turner, John Roscoe (1921). The Ricardian Rent Theory in Early American Economics. New York: New York University Press.
- Turner, Paul Venable (2000). Andover Hill: The Andover Campus, 1778 to the Present. Andover, MA: Addison Gallery of American Art. ISBN 1-56898-236-4.

Academic offices
Preceded by Ebenezer Pemberton	Principal of Phillips Academy; 1795–1809	Succeeded by John Adams
