= Elizabeth A. Morton National Wildlife Refuge =

Nature reserve in Noyack, New York, US

- IUCN category IV (habitat/species management area)
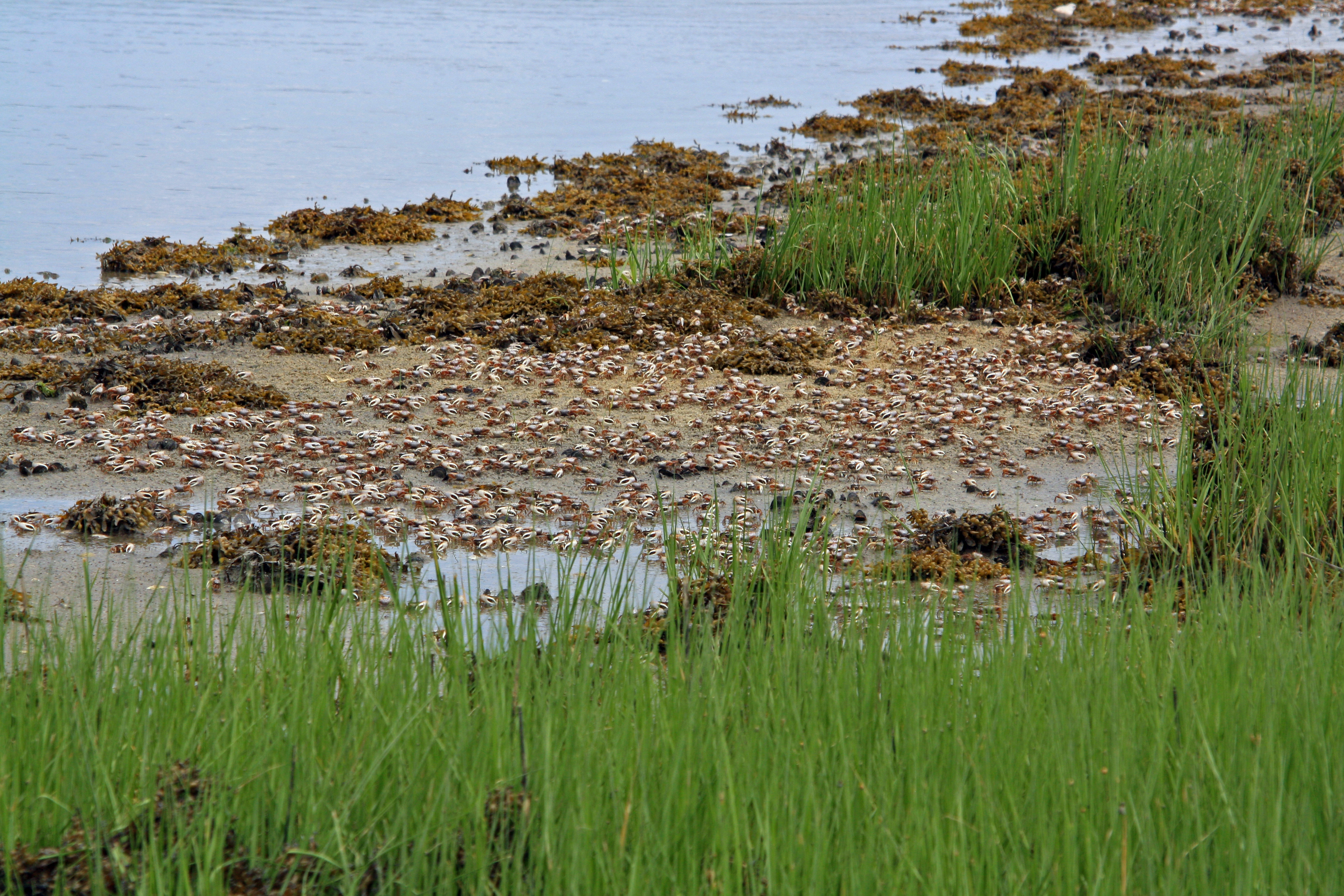

- Location within New York Location within the United States
- Location: Suffolk County, New York, United States
- Nearest city: Noyack, New York
- Coordinates: 41°00′17″N 72°22′11″W
- Area: 187 acres (76 ha)
- Established: 1954
- Governing body: U.S. Fish and Wildlife Service
- Website: Elizabeth A. Morton National Wildlife Refuge

The Elizabeth A. Morton National Wildlife Refuge is a 187-acre (76 ha) National Wildlife Refuge in Noyack, New York. Much of the refuge is situated on a peninsula surrounded by Noyack and Little Peconic bays. The refuge is managed by the United States Fish and Wildlife Service as part of the Long Island National Wildlife Refuge Complex.

== Overview ==
The refuge was established December 27, 1954, through a donation by Elizabeth Alexandra Morton. It encompasses diverse habitats including bay beach, a brackish pond, a freshwater pond, kettle holes, tidal flats, salt marsh, freshwater marsh, shrub, grasslands, maritime oak forest, and red cedar. The refuge's diversity is critical to Long Island wildlife.

The north/south orientation of the refuge's peninsula creates important habitat for shorebirds, raptors, and songbirds as they navigate the coastline during migration. Habitats along the beach attract nesting piping plovers, roseate terns, least terns, common terns, and shorebirds. The waters surrounding the refuge are considered critical habitats for juvenile Kemp's ridley sea turtles and are occasionally used by loggerhead sea turtles. Waterfowl use of the refuge peaks during the colder months. Long-tailed ducks, white-winged scoter, goldeneye and black ducks will most likely be spotted during winter.
