= John M. Kemper =

American military historian (1912–1971)

John Mason Kemper
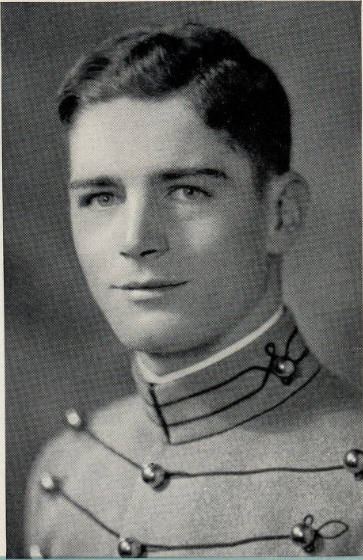
- United States Military Academy photograph of Kemper, 1935

11th Headmaster of Phillips Academy
- In office 1948–1971
- Preceded by: Claude Fuess
- Succeeded by: Ted Sizer

Personal details
- Born: September 1, 1912
- Died: December 4, 1971 (aged 59) Andover, Massachusetts
- Spouse(s): Sylvia Pratt (died 1961); Abby Castle
- Children: 3
- Education: United States Military Academy (1935); Columbia University (M.A.)

John Mason Kemper (September 1, 1912 – December 4, 1971) was a military historian and the 11th Headmaster of Phillips Academy Andover, serving for 23 years, from 1948 to 1971.

Kemper was born at Fort D.A. Russell in Wyoming into a military family. He graduated high school from Western High School in Washington, D.C. In 1931, he started at the United States Military Academy, and graduated in 1935.

Kemper later returned to West Point to teach history, and obtained a master's degree in history from Columbia University in 1942. He was serving in the historical division of the Army with the rank of lieutenant colonel when he was selected to be headmaster of Andover in 1948—the first chosen from outside the faculty ranks of the school in over 70 years. In the Army, Kemper had led the service's World War II historical program branch; the program today is now the United States Army Center of Military History.

In 1951, Kemper convinced the Lawrenceville School and Phillips Exeter Academy to join in what became the Advanced Placement program offering college level courses to high school students. Kemper also sought to dispel the view that private schools like Andover were "training grounds for snobs", and worked to diversify the student body. Kemper was featured on the cover of the October 26, 1962 issue of TIME.

In October 1971, at age 59, he announced his resignation, due to illness. He soon after died of cancer in December 1971, and is buried at the Phillips Academy Cemetery.

Academic offices
Preceded by Claude Fuess	Headmaster of Phillips Academy; 1948-1971	Succeeded by Ted Sizer
