= List of heads of school of Phillips Academy =

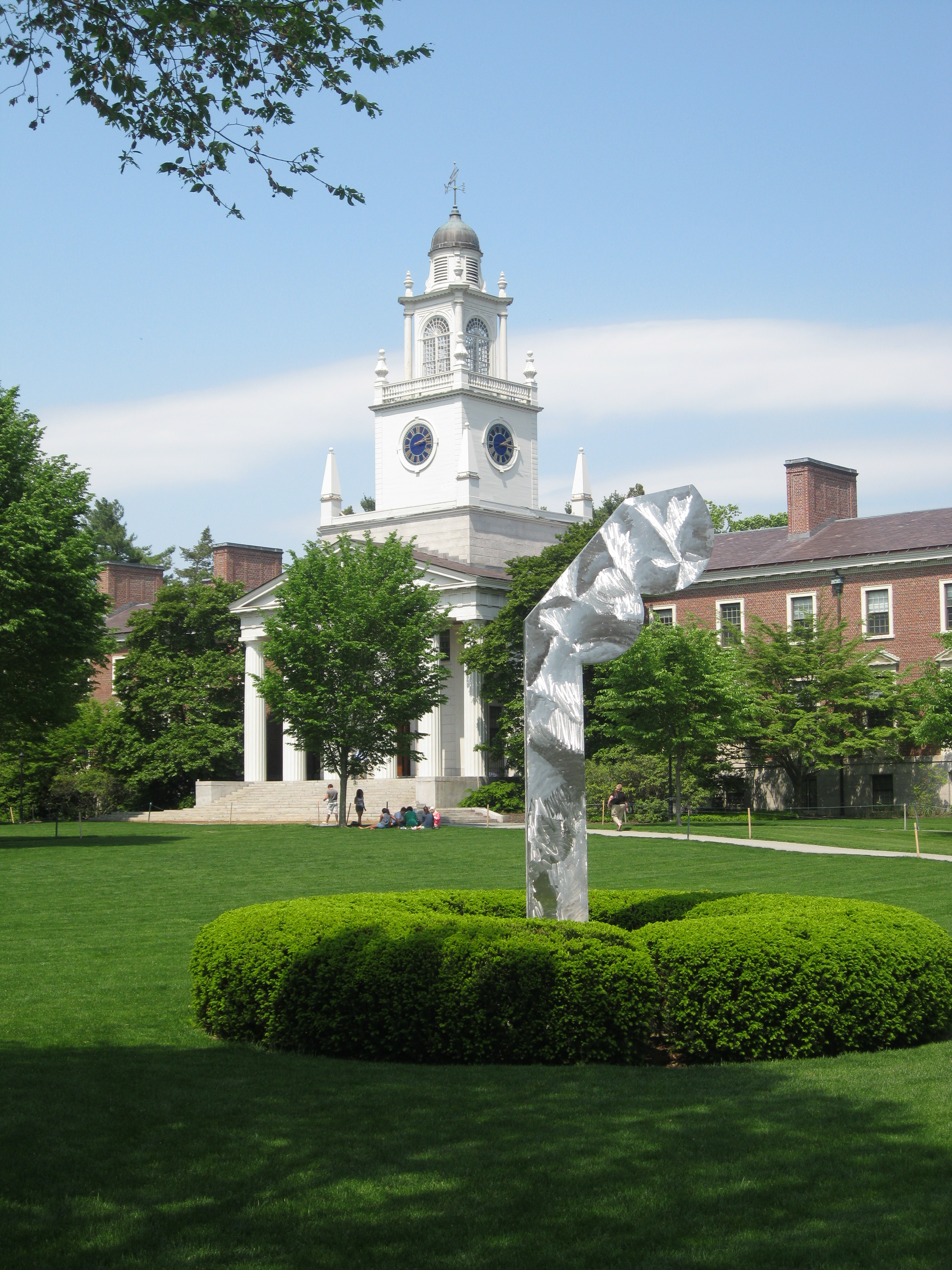
Phillips Academy Andover

This is a complete list of the principals of Phillips Academy since its founding in 1778. From 1778 to 1928, the title was "Principal". In the year 1928, the name was changed to "Headmaster", and finally with the appointment of Barbara Landis Chase, the title was changed to "Head of School".

== List ==
No.	Image	Head of School	From	To
1		Eliphalet Pearson, LL.D.	1778	1786
2		Ebenezer Pemberton, A.M.	1786	1793
3		Mark Newman, A.M.	1795	1809
4		John Adams, A.M., LL.D.	1810	1833
5		Osgood Johnson, A.M.	1833	1837
6		Samuel Harvey Taylor, LL.D.	1837	1871
7		Frederic W. Tilton, A.M.	1871	1873
8		Cecil Bancroft, Ph.D., L.H.D., LL.D.	1873	1901
9		Alfred Stearns, Litt.D., L.H.D., LL.D.	1903	1933
10		Claude Fuess, Ph.D., Litt.D., L.H.D., LL.D.	1933	1948
11		John M. Kemper, L.H.D., Litt.D., LL.D.	1948	1971
12	–	Theodore Sizer, Ph.D., PED.D., Litt.D.	1972	1981
13	–	Donald McNemar	1981	1994
14	–	Barbara Landis Chase	1994	2012
15		John Palfrey	2012	2019
16		Raynard S. Kington	July 1, 2020	July 1, 2027
17		James F. Ventre	July 1, 2027	elected
