= Alfred Stearns =

American school principal

Alfred E. Stearns Ph.D
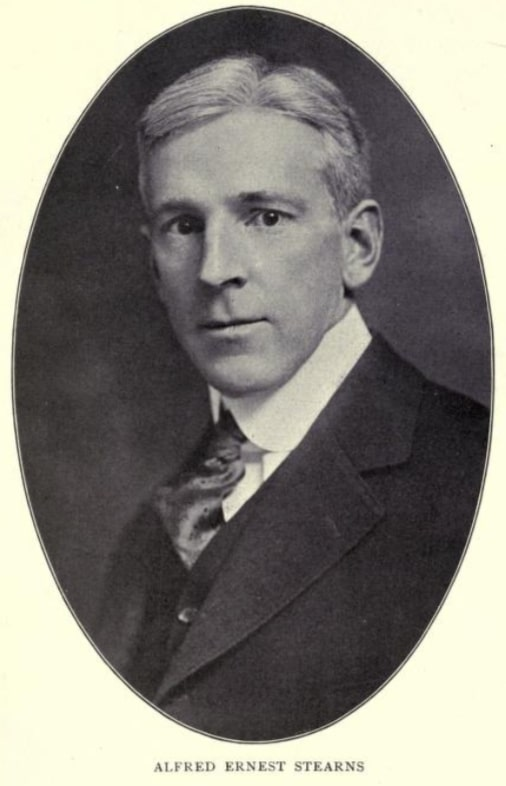

9th Principal of Phillips Academy
- In office 1903–1933
- Preceded by: Cecil Bancroft
- Succeeded by: Claude Moore Fuess

Personal details
- Born: Alfred Ernest Stearns; June 6, 1871 Orange, New Jersey, U.S.
- Died: November 15, 1949 (aged 78) Andover, Massachusetts, U.S.
- Resting place: Chapel Cemetery, Phillips Academy, Andover, MA
- Spouse: Kate Deane (m. 1900)

Alfred Ernest Stearns (June 6, 1871 - November 15, 1949) was an American educator and 9th Principal (Note: The contemporary name for the position is Head of School.) of Phillips Academy in Andover, Massachusetts from 1903 to 1933. He was featured on the cover of Time for its 8 February 1926 edition.

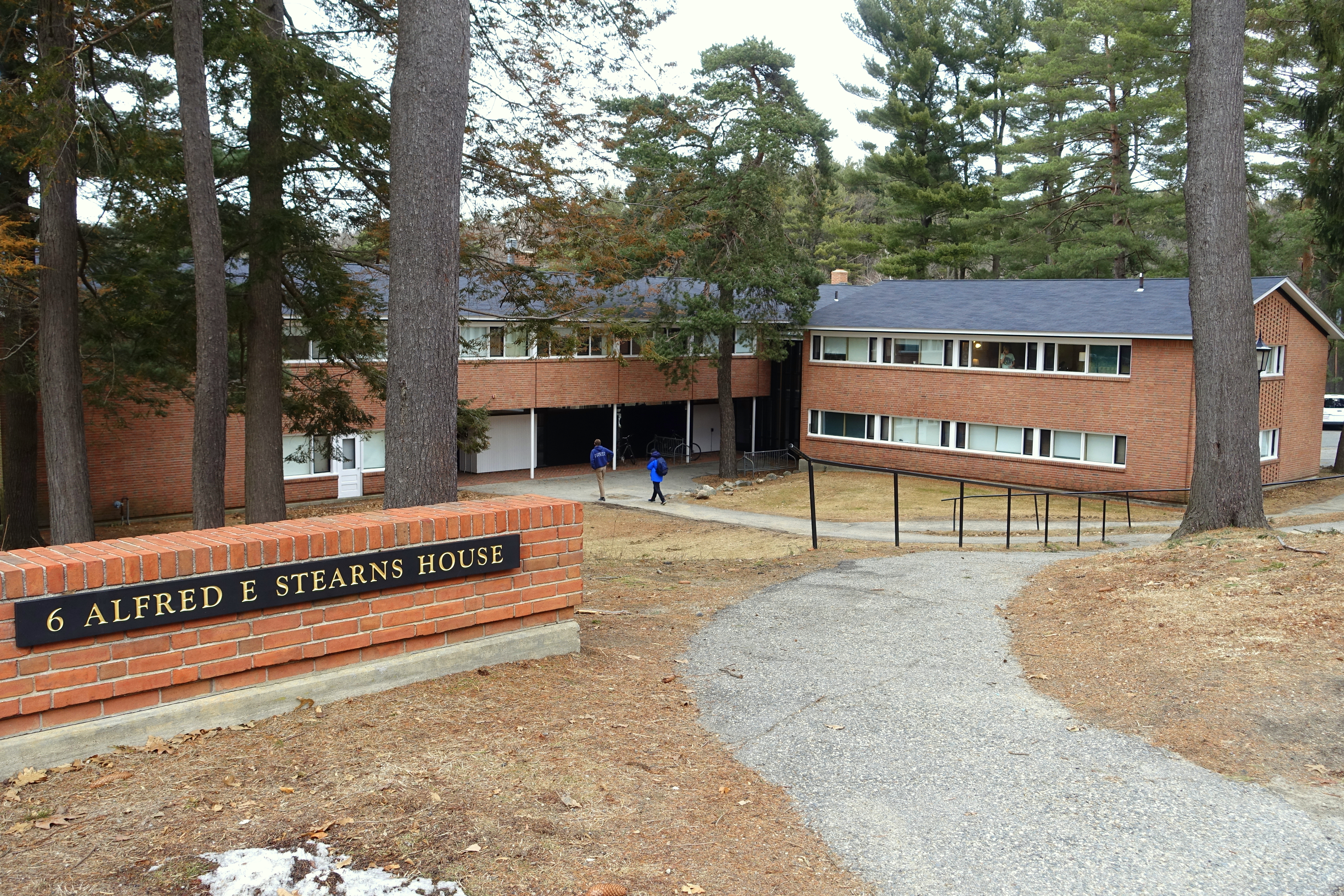
Alfred E. Stearns House, Phillips Academy

Stearns was a guest preacher at Central Congregational Church in Providence, Rhode Island.

== Bibliography ==
- Allis, Frederick Scouller Jr. (1979). Youth From Every Quarter: A Bicentennial History of Phillips Academy, Andover. Andover: Phillips Academy. ISBN 978-0-87451-157-4.
- Andover Townsman (November 17, 1949). "Dr. Alfred E. Stearns Noted Educator, Dies" (PDF). Vol. 63, no. 4. The Andover Townsman.
- Fuess, Claude Moore (1917). An Old New England School: A History of Phillips Academy Andover. Boston and New York: Houghton Mifflin Company.
- Trustees of Phillips Academy. "John Palfrey P'21". Andover. Trustees of Phillips Academy. Archived from the original on November 26, 2018.
