= Elizabeth Alexandra Morton =

American philanthropist

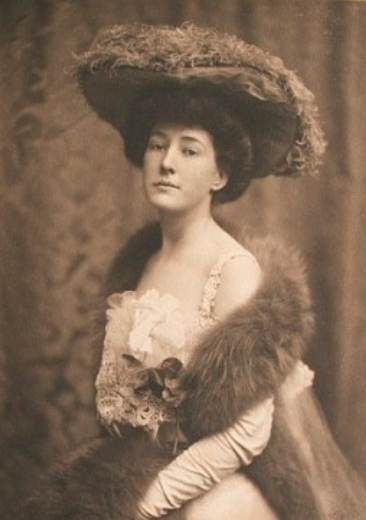
- Elizabeth Alexandra Morton, from a photograph published in 1904.
- Born: August 19, 1883
- Died: January 15, 1964 (aged 80); Southampton, New York, USA
- Other names: Elizabeth Morton Breese, Elizabeth Breese Tilton, Betty Morton
- Occupation: Philanthropist
- Known for: Elizabeth A. Morton National Wildlife Refuge
- Relatives: Frederic W. Tilton (father-in-law after 1921)

Elizabeth Alexandra Morton Breese Tilton (August 19, 1883 – January 15, 1964) was an American philanthropist, based on Long Island, New York. The Elizabeth A. Morton National Wildlife Refuge is named for her.

== Early life ==
Elizabeth Alexandra Morton was born in 1883, the daughter of Alexander Logan Morton and Mary E. Barber Morton. Her father was a West Point graduate from Virginia, who became a lawyer in New York and founder of the Shinnecock Hills Golf Club on Long Island.

== Career ==
After her second divorce, Morton resumed her birth name, moved into her parents' property, and donated almost two hundred acres on Long Island to the United States Fish and Wildlife Service in the mid-1950s. The Elizabeth A. Morton National Wildlife Refuge is named for her, and was the first national wildlife refuge named for a woman (the three others are named for Rachel Carson, Elizabeth S. Hartwell, and Julia Butler Hansen). She donated additional land to the Nature Conservancy in 1957, which became part of the Wolf Swamp Reserve.

== Personal life ==
Morton married twice. Her first husband was Sidney Salisbury Breese, son of James L. Breese; they married in 1907 and divorced in 1919. Her second husband was businessman Newell Whiting Tilton, son of educator Frederic W. Tilton; they married in 1921, and later divorced. Elizabeth Alexandra Morton died in 1964, aged 80 years, in Southampton.
