= Ted Sizer =

American education reformer (1932–2009)

- Born: Theodore Ryland Sizer; June 23, 1932; New Haven, Connecticut, USA
- Died: October 21, 2009 (aged 77); Harvard, Massachusetts, USA
- Education: B.A. Yale University; M.A., Ph.D., Harvard University
- Known for: Education reform
- Spouse: Nancy Faust Sizer (m. 1955)
- Children: 4

Theodore Ryland Sizer (June 23, 1932 – October 21, 2009) was a leader of educational reform in the United States, the founder (and eventually President Emeritus) of the Essential Schools Movement and was known for challenging longstanding practices and assumptions about the functioning of American secondary schools. Beginning in the late 1970s, he had worked with hundreds of high schools, studying the development and design of the American educational system, leading to his major work Horace's Compromise in 1984. In the same year, he founded the Coalition of Essential Schools based on the principles espoused in Horace's Compromise.

== Life and career ==
Sizer was born in New Haven, Connecticut, the son of Caroline Wheelright (née Foster) and Theodore Sizer Sr. (1892–1967), an art history professor at Yale University.

He earned his B.A. in English from Yale in 1953 and subsequently served in the Army as an artillery officer. He later described his experience leading soldiers in a democratic and egalitarian fashion as a formative influence on his ideas about education. After teaching in high schools, he earned his master's degree and doctorate in education from Harvard University in 1957 and 1961, respectively. He was a faculty member and later dean of the Harvard Graduate School of Education, a position he held during the 1969 Harvard student strike. While dean, he reorganized the school into seven departments, expanding the resources available for research (particularly in the area of urban education), while expanding minority enrollment. In 1970, he received a Guggenheim Fellowship for Education.

Sizer left Harvard to serve as headmaster of Phillips Academy in Andover, Massachusetts, from 1972 to 1981, to lead a study of American high schools sponsored by the National Association of Secondary School Principals and the National Association of Independent Schools. From 1983 to 1997, he worked at Brown University as a professor and chair of the education department, and, in 1993, he became the Founding Director of the Annenberg Institute for School Reform. He returned to Harvard as a visiting professor in 1997.

Horace's Compromise ^{[1]}, about an archetypical English high school teacher frustrated by an educational system locked in the 19th century, was the first of three influential books Sizer wrote while at Brown University. The others are Horace's School: Redesigning the American High School (1992) and Horace's Hope: What Works for the American High School(1996).

Sizer's Coalition of Essential Schools, founded in 1984, grew to include a diverse group of several hundred public and private schools nationwide united by ten common principles. The principles included a commitment to learning to use one's mind well, depth over coverage, personalization, and demonstrating mastery. In Essential Schools, students were seen as workers and teachers as coaches; a tone of decency and trust prevailed; policies, practices, and pedagogies were inclusive. The Coalition of Essential Schools ceased operation in 2016.

Sizer frequently collaborated with Nancy Faust Sizer, his spouse and fellow educator. After Brown University, the couple took a one-year position during the 1998–99 school year as co-principals of the Francis W. Parker Charter Essential School, which Ted helped found and served as a trustee. Deborah Meier joined the couple in writing Keeping School, based on the Parker experience. From 1997 through 2006, Sizer returned to the Harvard Graduate School of Education as a visiting professor. He and Nancy co-taught a course on redesigning the American secondary school, while he continued to work on the issues of integrating the multiple services that low socio-economic status families need in poor communities.

Sizer was a member of the American Academy of Arts and Sciences and the American Philosophical Society.

== Personal life ==
Theodore Sizer and Nancy Faust wed in 1955 and had four children together. He died at age 77 on October 21, 2009, at his home in Harvard, Massachusetts, of colon cancer.

== Works ==
- The Age of the Academies (1964)
- Secondary Schools at the Turn of the Century (1964)
- Places for Learning, Places for Joy (1973)
- Horace's Compromise: The Dilemma of the American High School (1984)
- Horace's School: Redesigning the American High School (1992)
- Horace's Hope: What Works for the American High School (1997)
- The Students Are Watching: Schools and the Moral Contract (1999, co-authored with Nancy Sizer)
- Keeping School: Letters to Families from Principals of Two Small Schools (2003, co-authored with Deborah Meier & Nancy Faust Sizer)
- The Red Pencil: Convictions From Experience in Education (2004)
- The New American High School (2013, posthumously)

Academic offices
Preceded by John Mason Kemper	Headmaster of Phillips Academy; 1972-1981	Succeeded by Donald McNemar
