= John Adams (educator) =

American educator (1772–1863)

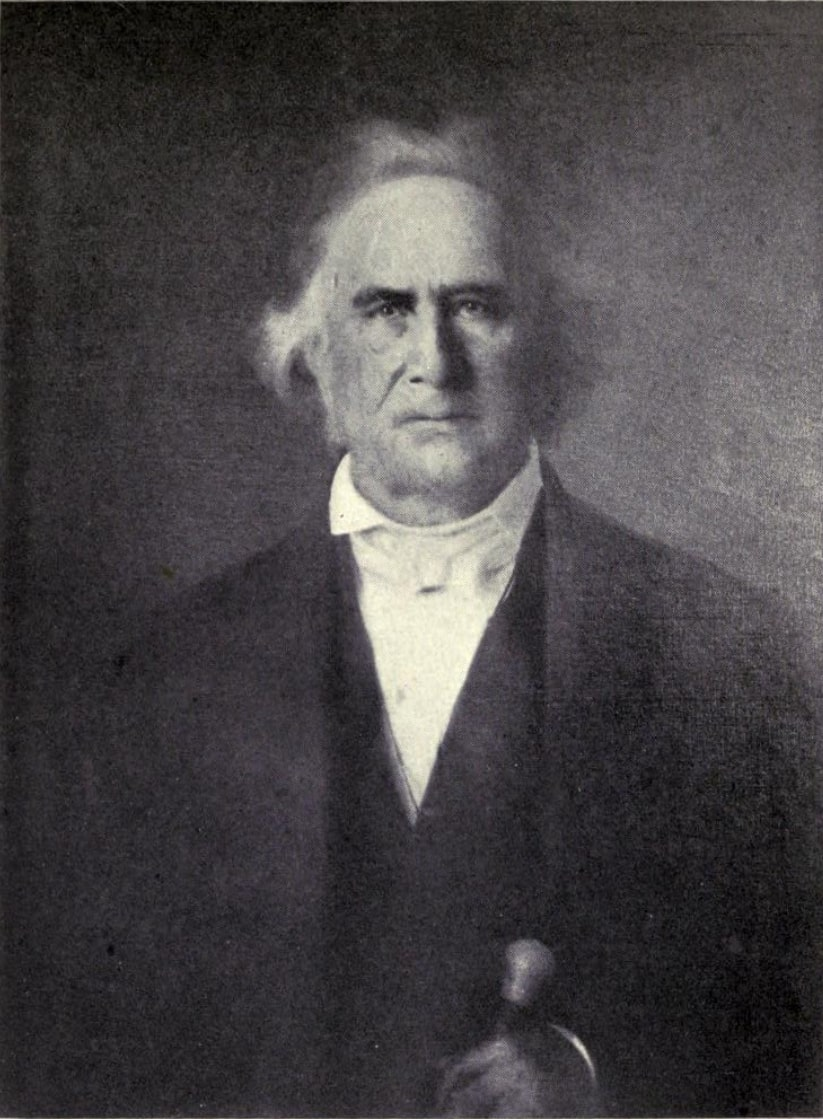

4th Principal of Phillips Academy
- In office 1810–1833
- Preceded by: Mark Newman
- Succeeded by: Osgood Johnson

Personal details
- Born: John Adams; September 18, 1772 Canterbury, Colony of Connecticut, British America
- Died: April 24, 1863 (aged 90) Jacksonville, Illinois
- Spouses: Elizabeth Ripley (m. 1798; died 1829) Mabel Stratton Burritt (m. 1831; died 1856)
- Children: William (b. 1807); Mary Elizabeth (b. 1842)
- Parent(s): John Adams; Mary Parker Adams
- Education: Yale University

John Adams (September 18, 1772 – April 24, 1863) was an American educator noted for organizing several hundred Sunday schools. He was the 4th Principal of Phillips Academy. His life was celebrated by Dr. Oliver Wendell Holmes Sr. in his poem, "The School Boy", which was read at the centennial celebration of Phillips Academy in 1878, thus recalls him:

Uneasy lie the heads of all that rule — His most of all whose kingdom is a school.

== Early life ==
John Adams was born in 1772 at Canterbury, Connecticut, to Captain John Adams, a farmer of Canterbury and an officer in the American Revolutionary War and Mary Parker, the daughter of Dea. Joshua Parker and Jemima Davenport. He graduated from Yale University in 1795.

== Career ==
From 1800 to 1803, Adams taught at the Plainfield, New Jersey Academy when he took the post as principal of Bacon Academy in Colchester, Connecticut. He remained in that position until 1810, when he started at the Phillips Academy in Andover, Massachusetts. He remained there until 1833. He also served as the principal of Monroe Academy in Elbridge, New York.

From 1836 to 1843, he serves as the principal of Jacksonville Female Academy in Jacksonville, Illinois. The Academy was incorporated in 1903 with Illinois College becoming an co-educational institution. (The first president of Illinois College, was Edward Beecher, Yale College, 1822 and a son of Dr. Lyman Beecher, Yale College, 1797). While in Jacksonville, he served as an agent of the American Sunday School Union for the Middle West region, and assisted in the organization of several hundred Sunday Schools.

== Personal life ==
John Adams married his first wife Elizabeth Ripley on May 8, 1798, with whom he had ten children. She was born on March 12, 1776, and died on February 23, 1829. She was a daughter of Gamaliel Ripley and Judith Perkins and was a great-great-granddaughter of Governor William Bradford (1590–1657) of the Plymouth Colony and a passenger on the Mayflower.

John Adams married, as his second wife, on August 30, 1831, in Troy, Rensselaer County, New York, Mrs. Mehitable/Mabel Burritt She was born July 19, 1779, in Williamstown, Berkshire County, Massachusetts, and died at Jacksonville, Illinois, on July 17, 1856. She was a daughter of Dea. Ebenezer Stratton and Mary Blair.

Mehitable/Mabel married as her first husband at Williamstown, Berkshire County, Massachusetts on April 12, 1798, Ely Burritt, born March 12, 1773, at Pound Ridge, Westchester County, New York. He died September 1, 1823, in Troy, Rensselaer County, New York. He graduated from Williams College in 1800, and was licensed to practice medicine at Troy, New York, on March 29, 1802, and quickly gained recognition for his medical skills. He was the eldest son of the Rev. Mr. Blackleach Burritt Yale College 1765 (a great-great-grandson of William Leete, a governor of the Colony of Connecticut) and Martha Welles (a great-great-granddaughter of Thomas Welles, the fourth governor of the Colony of Connecticut).

He died in Jacksonville, Illinois, on April 24, 1863.

=== Descendants ===
A son from his first marriage was the Rev. Dr. William Adams, D.D. (1807–1880) an 1827 graduate of Yale and a graduate of Andover Theological Seminary, 1830. He was a principal founder as well as president of Union Theological Seminary.

His daughter, Mary Elizabeth Adams, married on November 9, 1864, John Crosby Brown (1838–1909), the son of James Brown and Eliza Maria Coe. James Brown was a well known banker and founder of the family company Brown Bros. & Co. James and Eliza lost several of their children when the steamship SS Arctic sank in 1854.

John graduated from Columbia University in 1859. From 1866 onward, he was the senior partner of Brown Bros. & Co. This company merged in 1931 with Harriman Brothers & Company to become Brown Brothers Harriman & Co. one of the oldest and largest partnership banks in the United States.

A son of John and Mary Brown's was William Adams Brown (1865–1943). He was born in New York City and was educated privately at first, and then he went to St. Paul's School in Concord, New Hampshire. He received from Yale University an A.B. degree in 1886, an A.M. degree in 1888 and a Ph.D. in 1901. He graduated from the Union Theological Seminary in 1890, and studied at the University of Berlin from 1890 to 1892. He was ordained in the Presbyterian Church in 1893. He was a member of the Yale Corporation from 1917 to 1934, and was acting president of Yale University from 1919 to 1920.

A great-grandson of John Adams's was William Adams Delano.

== Notes ==
Academic offices
Preceded by Mark Newman	Principal of Phillips Academy; 1810–1833	Succeeded by Osgood Johnson
