= William Burnet Wright =

American clergyman

William Burnet Wright (April 15, 1838 in Cincinnati – 1924) was an American Congregational clergyman from Ohio. His works include Master and Men, published in 1894.
