= Claude Fuess =

American educator, administrator, and biographer

Claude Moore Fuess
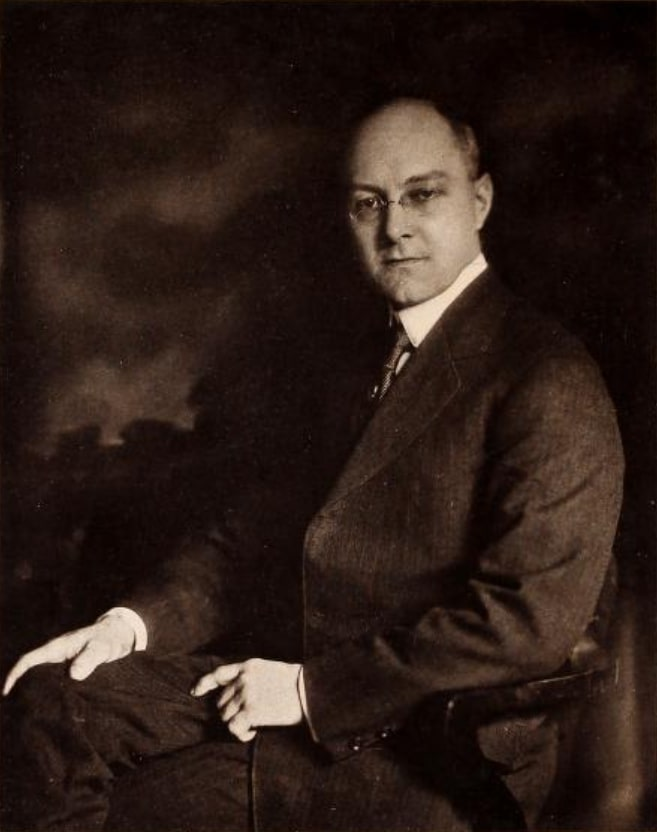
- Claude Moore Fuess from the 1918 Pot Pourri

10th Headmaster of Phillips Academy
- In office 1933–1948
- Preceded by: Alfred E. Stearns
- Succeeded by: John M. Kemper

Personal details
- Born: Claude Moore Fuess; January 12, 1885 Waterville, New York, U.S.
- Died: September 11, 1963 (aged 78) Brookline, Massachusetts
- Resting place: Chapel Cemetery, Phillips Academy, Andover, Massachusetts
- Spouse(s): Elizabeth Cushing Goodhue (m. 1911; died 1943) Lulie Anderson Blackfan (m. 1945; died 1956)
- Children: John Cushing Fuess (b. 1912)
- Parent(s): Louis Phillip Fuess; Helen Augusta Moore
- Education: Amherst College (AB); Columbia University (MA, PhD)

Claude Moore Fuess (January 12, 1885 – September 11, 1963) was an American author, historian, educator, and the 10th Headmaster (Note: The contemporary name for the position is Head of School.) of Phillips Academy Andover from 1933 to 1948.

After attending Amherst College and earning a PhD at Columbia University, Fuess taught English at Phillips Academy from 1908 to 1933. As Headmaster he guided the school in a new era as it faced the Great Depression and Second World War. Concurrent with his teaching and position, Fuess led a writing career spanning several decades. He is credited as the author or editor of over 30 books and articles including biographies of Caleb Cushing, Calvin Coolidge, Rufus Choate, Daniel Webster, and Carl Schurz.

== Early life ==
=== Family and ancestry ===
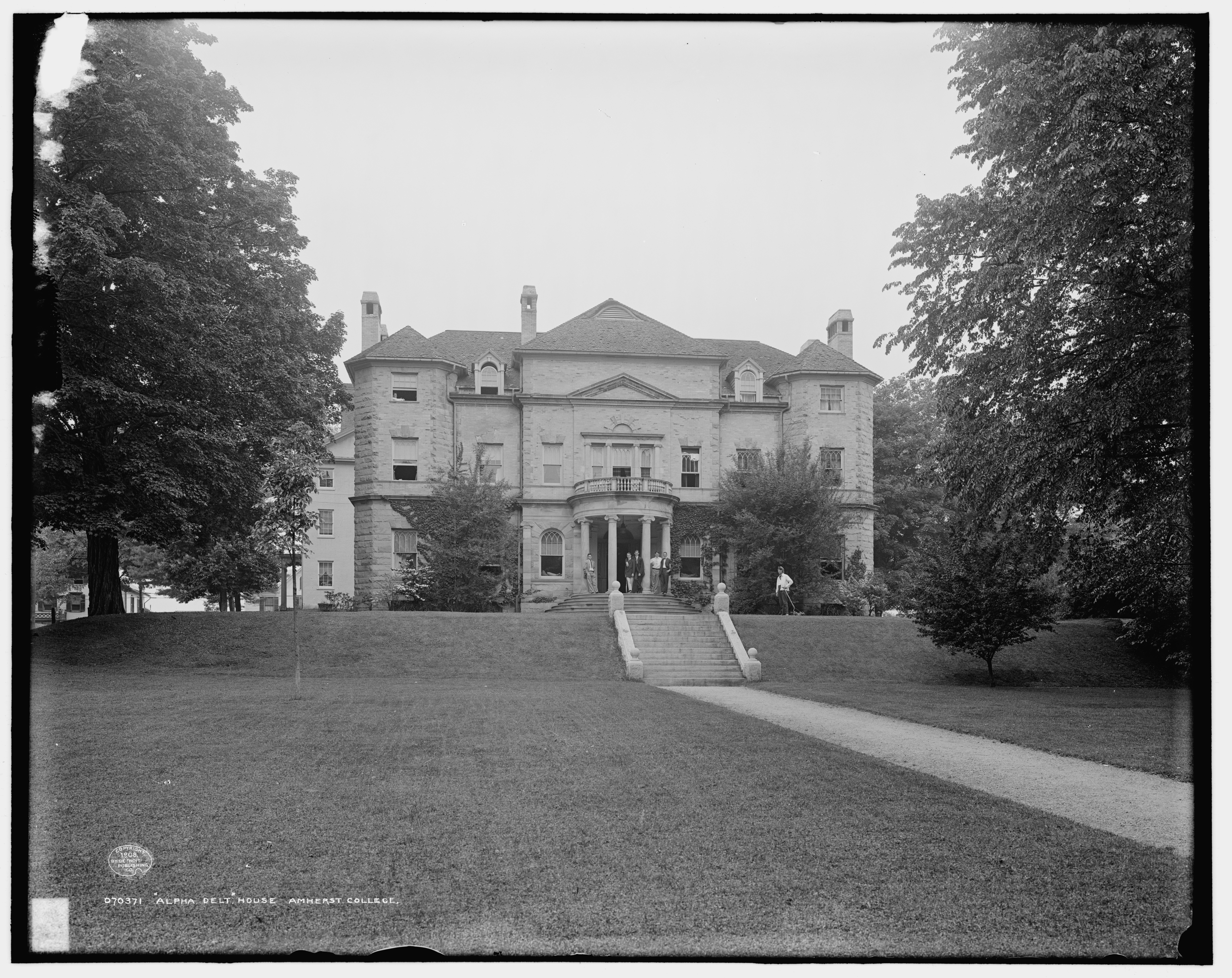
Alpha Delta Phi House, Amherst College

Fuess was born on January 12, 1885, in Waterville, New York, to Louis Phillip Fuess and Helen Augusta Moore. His paternal grandfather Jacob Fuess was from Annweiler am Trifels, Germany in the Bavarian Palatinate. He fled Germany during the Revolution in 1848 and emigrated to the United States, landing in New Orleans and making his way to New York City. He had one younger brother named Harold L. Fuess, an active member of local government in and around Waterville including Town Clerk of Sangerfield, New York. Originally spelled Füsz, the family changed the spelling to Fuess due to its difficult pronunciation for Americans. According to Fuess, he and his family pronounce their name Fease. Oftentimes he would go by one his nicknames. Those he knew in high school and at Amherst College called him "Dutch." At Phillips Academy he was known as either "Jack" or "Claudie" or once Headmaster "B.D." (Bald Doctor). Someone even wrote the following poem titled "Fuess Please" in 1930 to illustrate the difficulty of his name:

He'll exclaim, "Oh what's the use!"
When he hears you utter "Fuess."
And he'll like it even less
If you say it's Mr. Fuess.
If you want to hear him cuss
Just be sure to call him Fuess.
All his wonted calm he'll lose
If perchance you murmur "Fuess";
But he'll thank you on his knees
If you will but call him "Fuess."

Despite such difficulty Fuess decided not to simplify his name because of the legal obstacles he would face and the honor it held to him personally and in Bavaria.

=== Education ===
Fuess was an avid reader at an early age. He played football for Waterville High School's first team and cycled for the school's first track team. Cycling events included half and one-mile races around a half-mile dirt track. He entered Amherst College in the autumn of 1901 at the age of 16 and graduated in 1905. While at Amherst he grew interests in forensics, debate, and public speaking. He continued to train for Amherst's cycling team but was unable to race when the New England Committee abolished the cycling races from its athletic program. He was a member of the fraternity Alpha Delta Phi. He took courses in debate, public speaking, and German. In the fall of 1905 he entered Columbia University. After earning his M.A. in 1906, he accepted in 1908 an invitation to be an assistant in Columbia's English Department. He earned his Ph.D. at the same institution in 1912, his thesis titled "Lord Byron as a Satirist in Verse".

He was awarded a Doctorate of Letters, an honorary degree from Amherst College in 1929 for his career as an English teacher and author. Fuess continued to keep close connections with Amherst for the rest of his life. He was chairman of the executive committee of the Alumni Council, President of the Society of the Alumni, for two years National President of Alpha Delta Phi, and President of the Amherst Corporate Chapter of Alpha Delta Phi. In addition, he published Amherst, The Story of a New England College in 1935 to illustrate the evolution of educational thought. Frederick Allis, who discusses Fuess in his book Youth From Every Quarter: A Bicentennial History of Phillips Academy, Andover characterizes his relationship with Amherst "clearly a love affair." Fuess earned a total of eight honorary degrees over his lifetime.

== Career ==
Fuess began his career in teaching while a student and assistant in the English Department at Columbia. He took the advice of his mentor, Professor William P. Trent, and took a year off from school to teach at the George School, a coeducational secondary school in Pennsylvania, before making his way unexpectedly to Phillips Academy where he would settle.

=== Phillips Academy ===
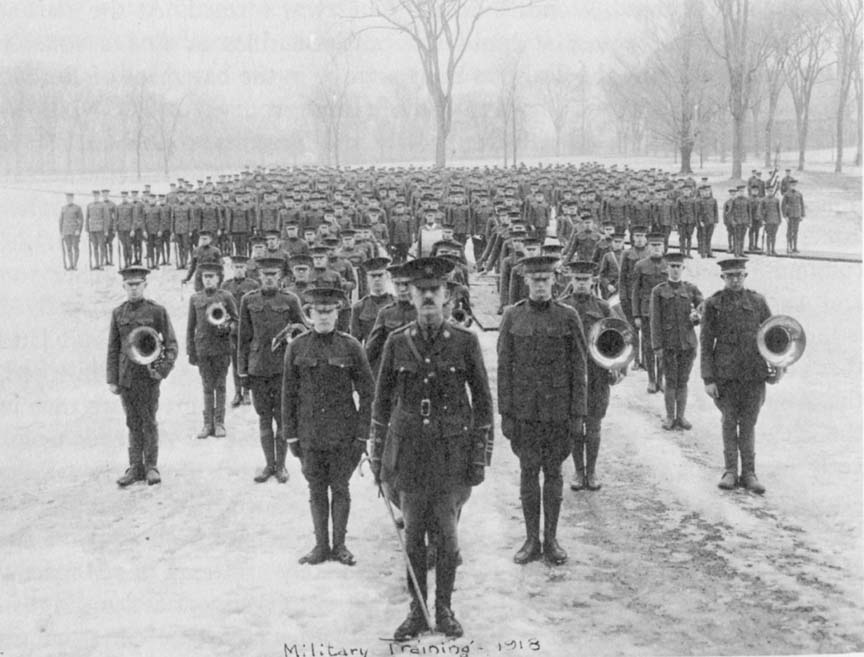
The Andover Battalion, 1918

Fuess spent a substantial portion of his career at Phillips Academy, a coeducational secondary boarding school which was at the time an all boys school. Fuess received an invitation from the current headmaster Alfred E. Stearns to a position in the English Department. At first he declined, convinced he would join the faculty at Columbia University. Stearns knew their English Department was short one teacher and needed someone in the area with a college degree. After making a convincing job offer, $1200 a year with room and board, and receiving a telegram from a professor at Columbia urging him to take the job, he accepted. He began his tenure in the fall of 1908 living in Draper Cottage.

As an English teacher he focused on teaching his students to articulate themselves and nurturing their natural instincts of curiosity and a desire to learn. In 1913 he assumed editorship of the quarterly publication Phillips Bulletin. In the summer of 1918 he was asked by John Pershing to commission 200 of his students as Second Lieutenants to serve in the First World War, which he did. That September Fuess himself was commissioned as a Major in the Quartermaster Corps at Camp Johnston in Jacksonville, Florida. He soon caught influenza and was honorably discharged in January 1919. He soon became a popular figure among the younger alumni who knew him and known as one of the best English teachers of his time. John U. Monro, Class of 1930 and later Trustee of Phillips Academy, found himself throughout his life "dependent for survival" on the "solid growing pleasure he takes in the use of language he traces back easily to Jack Fuess."

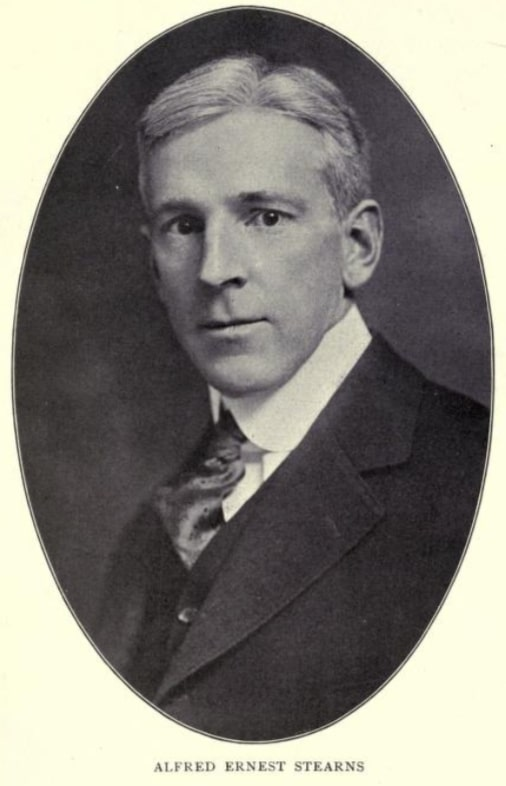
Alfred Ernest Stearns

In March 1933, Alfred Stearns was forced to resign in the midst of a scandal. He was a widower and married his housekeeper, someone "beneath his social class." Upon the resignation of Alfred Stearns, Fuess was appointed acting headmaster of the school which had just begun a new era. The successful banker Thomas Cochran had worked closely with architect Charles Platt over the past several years to transform the campus and construct a number of new buildings, notably the Addison Gallery of American Art. At the same time however, the academy was in the middle of a traumatic moment in its history. Professor and Judge James Hardy Ropes, President of the Board of Trustees, died suddenly; Thomas Cochran, now considered a driving force of the school, was in poor health among others on the board of trustees. Similar to when Fuess accepted the job as an English teacher in 1908, he was reluctant. This time he was interested in a job as Professor of Biography at Amherst College, which would allow him to continue his writing career more freely. For the next month, the Board of Trustees interviewed a number of candidates for Headmaster outside of the school. They soon concluded to "stick with someone whom they knew and respected, someone, furthermore, who knew Phillips Academy thoroughly and whose election would reassure the Andover community." On May 28, 1933, Fuess was formally elected 10th Headmaster by the Trustees.

During the first few years of his administration Fuess worked to acquire funds to renovate Bulfinch Hall to house the school's English Department. In the past it had served as a gym and at that point a dining hall. With a gift totaling $725,000 from Edward Harkness he was able to renovate the building and install English classrooms as well as provide five teaching foundations including on-campus residences for each. "My heart is very full over these gifts from Mr. Harkness," he said announcing the project at Commencement in June 1936. The gift sparked a boost in morale for the school amidst the Great Depression. By the time if his retirement in 1948 the English Department had grown from four to sixteen faculty members.

As Headmaster, Fuess received mixed reviews from the student body. Some had much respect for Fuess while others less so. One student said the following of him:

"We thought Claudie was born to be a college president...and I think we admired him for putting up with the likes of us so patiently and so affably while he was waiting for the lightning to strike. I have no idea what his "policies" were. I just know he always performed as we thought he should....I can see him now, dressed like a banker with pince nez in place, standing in the middle of a gym floor crowded with students, saying just the right thing. The charisma was several layers down, but it was there, and we knew it was there, and we loved him for it."

Another was much less favorable:

"One thing is definite, however. He hadn't the slightest interest in boys. Out of roughly 700 boys at Andover, I would doubt that Mr. Fuess could name a hundred. Fifty had parents so rich that he could not ignore them in his money raising activities. Fifty were such hell raisers that he couldn't ignore them. I was in the latter category."

Just months after George H. W. Bush and family friend Godfrey A. Rockefeller graduated in 1942, Fuess without warning announced his plan to ban secret societies. Having been in place since the 1870s, the plan caused an uproar among alumni and the issue gained some newspaper attention. Fuess and the Trustees, including President of the Board Henry Stimson, never disclosed why they decided to act at that moment, but they cited an incident in 1934 that resulted in the death of a student, described as such:

"In 1934 one undergraduate had been killed during the course of a Society initiation. A group of alumni had joined the undergraduates for part of the ceremonies that were held in a barn on the outskirts of Andover. On the way back the initiate rode on the running board of a car driven by one of the alumni. The roads were slippery, and the car crashed into a telegraph pole, crushing the boy, who died in Dr. Fuess's presence in the hospital a few hours later."

Fuess also said, "the purpose for which the secret societies were founded no longer seems apparent." At the time of the incident Phillips Academy brushed it aside, not blaming the secret societies. While alumni against the decision accused Fuess of "fascism", those who agreed with him noted that secret societies "promoted exclusiveness", operated "on a special privilege basis," and created "social cleavage." Attention on the issue settled over the next few years and in 1949, the school quietly enacted a ban, two years after Fuess stepped down from Headmaster.

By 1947, Fuess knew he wanted to retire. He would have served a total of 40 years at Phillips Academy, 25 as an English teacher and 15 as Headmaster. In addition his hearing began to fail, requiring a hearing aid. In 1948 Fuess officially retired and was succeeded by John Mason Kemper.

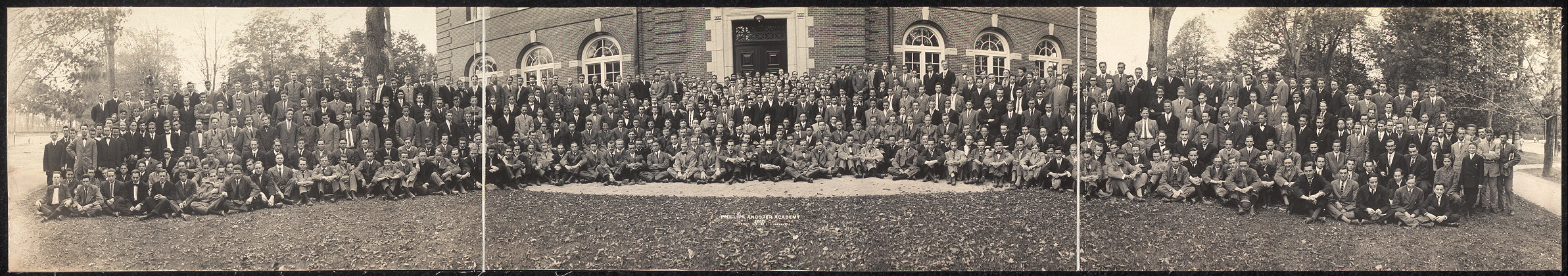
Phillips Academy student body 1910

=== Authorship ===
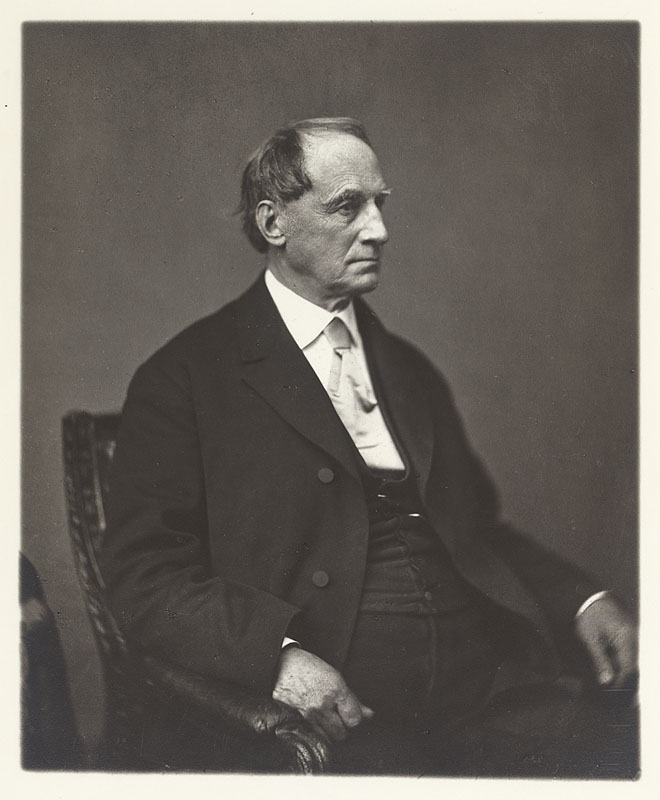
Caleb Cushing by Mathew B. Brady

Fuess specialized in political biography, completing his first on Caleb Cushing in 1923. At that point he had already been writing and editing for over a decade, mostly school textbooks and compilations of other works. He wrote another biography in 1930 on Daniel Webster, further establishing his writing career in that field. He continued to author a number of biographies afterward. Fuess was also a historian. He wrote several books on New England academic institutions including Phillips Academy and Amherst College and their respective towns. The following is an excerpt from his obituary in the Proceedings of the American Antiquarian Society on his writing style:

It might be said that in his writings he was concerned with the truth, as he comprehended it, and not with facts. It was the skillfully written biography rather than the learned one which won the praise which he was quick to bestow.

— American Antiquarian Society, October 1963

His writing career no doubt had its failures. Fuess received a request from Frank Waterman Stearns to write a biography of Stearns himself. He died in 1939 and in 1941 his family requested the project be abandoned. In 1933 he was elected to the American Antiquarian Society but his first paper was met with dissatisfaction among its members. His biographies on Calvin Coolidge and Caleb Cushing were criticized for painting the men in too favorable a light. According to the authors of an unauthorized biography of George H. W. Bush, Fuess failed to mention the opium trafficking industry that brought both families (Coolidge's and Cushing's) their wealth. They described Fuess in their book as "the designated chief liar for the 'Bostonian Race'" and "one of the most skillful liars of the modern age."

Upon his appointment as Headmaster in 1933 Fuess decided to finish his current projects, notably a history of Amherst College and a biography of President Calvin Coolidge, instead of devoting his time completely to the school. He finished both projects by 1940. Allis argues in his bicentennial history of Phillips Academy that Fuess' occupation with his writing career hindered his effectiveness as Headmaster.

== Later life ==
Fuess remained an active author and figure after his retirement from Phillips Academy in 1948. He published over five books in this time before his death.

In 1952 he published an autobiography titled Independent Schoolmaster. The New York Times wrote in a review in 1952 that the word "independent" was "something of a pun", pointing at Fuess' forty-year connection with Phillips Academy and the more common word "private" to describe such schools.

In 1957 he spoke at the 150th anniversary celebration of the Andover Newton Theological School, formerly known as the Andover Theological Seminary before moving to a campus in Newton in the early twentieth century. Phillips Academy and the Seminary had shared a long history together in Andover as neighbors, the former founded in 1778 and the latter in 1808. In his speech titled "Escape from the Dead Hand", Fuess believed in a bright future for the seminary, in part because it had moved on from its rigid past. He declared that "Andover Seminary is no longer the Citadel of Orthodoxy but the Home of Protestant Freedom," concluding "the cherished orthodoxies of one age are rightly rejected by the next."

In 1962, a year before his death, Fuess attended and spoke at the dedication of the Claude M. Fuess dormitory on the Phillips Academy campus. In the same year, he was interviewed by Frank W. Rounds of the Columbia University Oral History Research Project, focusing on his time at Andover.

== Personal life and death ==
Fuess married Elizabeth Cushing Goodhue, (Note: Elizabeth Cushing Goodhue was an author, genealogist, and philatelist. She was born in Malden to Francis Abbot and Elizabeth Johnson (Cushing) Goodhue, and a descendant of William Goodhue who settled in Ipswich in 1635-6. She attended public schools in Brookline as well as Abbot Academy in Andover. She published three books on genealogy: "Cushing and Allied Families", "Goodhue and Allied Families", and "Fuess and Allied Families".) a relative of politician Caleb Cushing, on June 27, 1911. They had one child named John Cushing Fuess (Note: John Cushing Fuess (April 13, 1912 – ?) was a United States Foreign Service officer and the only child of Claude Moore and Elizabeth Cushing (Goodhue) Fuess. Born in Andover, he graduated from Phillips Academy in 1931 and Harvard with an A.B. in 1935 and an M.A. in 1936. He continued his education at the Fletcher School of Law and Diplomacy from 1938 to 1939. He began his career with the United States Department of State in 1939 and held positions of consul and vice consul in Mexico City, Auckland, Cape Town, Santiago, Milan, Rome, Trieste, and Belfast. He married Cora Frances Henry (1915 – 1984) and had two sons, James H. and David Cushing Fuess. Fuess retired in 1971.) in 1912. She died on July 26, 1943. He remarried Lulie Anderson Blackfan on December 15, 1945. She died on November 6, 1956. They had no children together.

Fuess' health declined in his last year and died in 1963 a widower. He is buried in the Phillips Academy Cemetery along with both of his spouses. His epitaph reads:

For forty years a
teacher and headmaster
"Wit graced his learning
and generous warmth
his friendship"

== Publications and further reading ==
Fuess is credited as the author or editor of over 30 books and articles. The following is a partial list, ordered chronologically, and includes external links via footnotes to each when available.

- English Narrative Poems (1909) coauthored with Henry N. Sanborn, also an English teacher at Phillips Academy
- Lord Byron as Satirist in Verse (1912)
- Milton's "Minor Poems" (1914) (editor)
- Selected English Letters (1914)
- Selected Essays (1914)
- Selected Short Stories (1914)
- Selections for Oral English (1914)
- A High School Spelling Book (1915) coauthored with Arthur W. Leonard
- An Old New England School: A History Of Phillips Academy Andover (1917)
- Phillips Academy, Andover in the Great War (1919)
- Andover, Massachusetts in the World War (1921)
- A Little Book of Society Verse (1922) coauthored with Harold Crawford Stearns
- Good Writing: A Modern Rhetoric (1922), coauthored with Arthur W. Leonard
- R.L.S. Its Fortieth Anniversary (1922) (Riverside Literature Series)
- The Life of Caleb Cushing (1923) (2 vols.) Volume 1 Volume 2
- Selections from the Victorian Poets (1923), coedited with Harold C. Stearns
- All for Andover (1925), illustrated by John Goss
- The Amherst Memorial Volume; A Record Of The Contribution Made By Amherst College And Amherst Men In the World War, 1914-1918 (1926)
- The Andover Way (1926)
- Peter Had Courage (1927), illustrated by Lloyd J. Dotterer
- Men of Andover (1928)
- Rufus Choate, The Wizard of the Law (1928)
- Practical Précis Writing (1929)
- Daniel Webster (1930)
- Caleb Cushing, A Memoir (1932) from Proceedings of the Massachusetts Historical Society, Volume 64, October 1931 (page 440)
- Carl Schurz (1932)
- Amherst, The Story of a New England College (1935)
- The Story of Essex County (1935) (4 vols.) Volume 1 Volume 2 Volume 3 Volume 4
- Thomas Cochran (1937), a biography of Thomas Cochran (1871–1936), an alumnus of and donor to Phillips Academy.
- Calvin Coolidge, The Man From Vermont (1940)
- Unseen Harvests: A Treasury of Teaching (1947), coedited with Emory S. Basford
- The College Board, Its First Fifty Years (1950)
- Independent Schoolmaster (1952) an autobiography
- Joseph B. Eastman, Servant Of The People (1952)
- Stanley King Of Amherst (1955)
- Andover: Symbol of New England (1959)
- In My Time: A Medley of Andover Reminiscences (1959)

== Bibliography ==
- Allis, Frederick Scouller Jr. (1979). Youth From Every Quarter: A Bicentennial History of Phillips Academy, Andover. Andover: Phillips Academy. ISBN 978-0-87451-157-4.
- Amherst College Archives and Special Collections. "Biographical Note". Five College Archives and Manuscript Collections. Trustees of Amherst College. Archived from the original on 26 November 2018.
- Bendroth, Margaret Lamberts (2008). A School of the Church: Andover Newton Across Two Centuries. Cambridge, UK: William B. Eerdmans. p. 158. ISBN 978-0-8028-6370-6. "Claude Fuess -wikipedia."
- Bright, James Wilson, ed. (1922). Modern Language Notes. Vol. 37. Baltimore: Johns Hopkins Press.
- Department of State (1947). Biographic Register of the Department of State 1946. Washington D. C.: United States Department of State.
- Fuess, Claude (1952). Independent Schoolmaster. Boston: Little Brown.
- Miller, Perry (November 16, 1952). "A Teacher's Testament; INDEPENDENT SCHOOLMASTER. By Claude M. Fuess. 371 pp. Boston: Little, Brown & Co. $5". The New York Times.
- Monro, John U. (1959). "Andover Personalities". In Fuess, Claude Moore (ed.). In My Time: A Medley of Andover Reminiscences. Andover, Massachusetts: Phillips Academy. Archived from the original on 14 September 2023.
- The New England Historical and Genealogical Register. Boston: New England Historic Genealogical Society. 1943.
- "Dr.Claude Fuess, Teacher, Author; Retired Phillips Academy Headmaster Dies at 78". The New York Times. 1963-09-11.
- Oneida County, New York Board of Supervisors (1917). Proceedings of the Board of Legislators of the County of Oneida, New York, Volume 1916. Utica: Oneida County Board of Supervisors.
- Phillips Academy Archives and Special Collections. "Claude M. Fuess, 1933-1948 Collection Guide". Archives and Special Collections Phillips Academy Andover. Phillips Academy Andover. Archived from the original on 11 December 2017.
- Pot Pourri Editorial Board (1931). Pot Pourri 1931. Andover, Massachusetts: Phillips Academy.
- Shipton, Clifford K. (October 1963). "Claude Moore Fuess" (PDF). Proceedings of the American Antiquarian Society. 73 (2): 339–340. Archived from the original (PDF) on 14 September 2023.
- Star-Ledger (22 July 2012). "James H. Fuess". The Star-Ledger. Legacy.com. Archived from the original on 26 November 2018.
- "Obituaries". State (270). August–September 1984.
- Tarpley, Webster G.; Chaitkin, Anton (1992). "Chapter - V - Poppy and Mommy". George Bush: The Unauthorized Biography. Webster G. Tarpley.
- Trustees of Phillips Academy. "John Palfrey P'21". Andover. Trustees of Phillips Academy. Archived from the original on 26 November 2018.
- Trustees of Phillips Academy (1931). Order of Exercises at Exhibition Phillips Academy Andover (PDF). Andover, Massachusetts: The Andover Press. Archived from the original (PDF) on 14 September 2023.

Academic offices
Preceded by Alfred Stearns	Headmaster of Phillips Academy; 1933-1948	Succeeded by John Mason Kemper
