= Simeon Draper =

American politician (1806–1866)

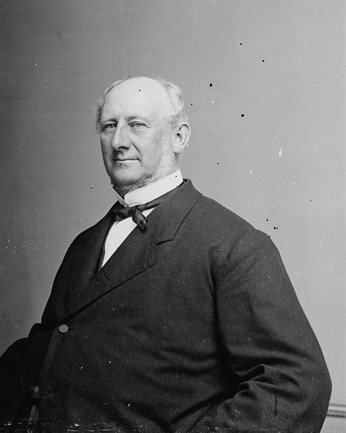
- Draper during his tenure Collector of the Port of New York

16th Collector of the Port of New York
- In office 1864–1865
- Preceded by: Hiram Barney
- Succeeded by: Preston King

3rd Chairman of the New York Republican State Committee
- In office 1860–1862
- Preceded by: James Kelly
- Succeeded by: Henry R. Low

Member of the New York Metropolitan Police District Board of Commissioners
- In office April 16, 1857 – November 7, 1857
- Preceded by: None (position created)
- Succeeded by: Periah Perit

Personal details
- Born: January 19, 1806 Brookfield, Massachusetts
- Died: November 6, 1866 (aged 60) Whitestone, Queens County, New York
- Resting place: Trinity Church Cemetery, Manhattan, New York
- Party: Republican
- Other political affiliations: Whig (before 1854)
- Spouse: Frances S. Haggerty (m. 1834)
- Children: 5
- Parent(s): Simeon Draper (1765–1848); Mary "Polly" Bemis
- Relatives: William B. Draper (brother); William Draper Lewis (great-grandson); Francis Draper Lewis (great-grandson)
- Occupation: Businessman; Public official

Simeon Draper (January 19, 1806 – November 6, 1866) was a merchant and politician in New York City. During the American Civil War, he was the federal government's agent for receiving captured cotton from the Confederate States of America and selling it to benefit the Union war effort.

A native of Brookfield, Massachusetts, Draper clerked for a Boston merchant before moving to New York City to begin his own business career. A successful merchant, he became wealthy enough to broaden his holdings, which grew to include real estate, insurance, and banking.

A Whig in politics, and later a Republican, Draper served on the Whig state committee several times in the 1840s and 1850s; after becoming a Republican following the party's founding in the mid-1850s, he served as chairman of the New York Republican State Committee from 1860 to 1862.

During the American Civil War, Draper received a high-paying patronage appointment as Collector of the Port of New York. He was also appointed as an agent of the federal government responsible to receive, store, and dispose of cotton captured in the Confederate States of America. The results of a post-war investigation indicated that Draper used this post to recover from financial setbacks he had during the Panic of 1857 by diverting some of the proceeds of the sale of captured cotton to his personal use.

Draper died in Whitestone, Queens County, New York in 1866, and was buried at Trinity Church Cemetery in Manhattan.

== Early life ==
Draper was born in Brookfield, Massachusetts on January 19, 1806, the eighth son and 12th child of Captain Simeon Draper (1765–1848), and his first wife, Mary "Polly" Bemis, the daughter of Col. Benjamin Bemis. He was a merchant's clerk in Boston, Massachusetts before coming to New York City where he settled as a merchant. His business interests later expanded to include real estate investment, development, and auctions, as well as insurance and investment banking.

== Political career ==
Draper was a friend of Daniel Webster, William H. Seward, Thurlow Weed, and a member of the Whig Party. He began his political career in the 1840s when he was appointed a member of the Board of Ten Governors, then in charge of New York City charities. When the law creating the board was repealed, Draper served as Commissioner of Public Charities and Correction. In the 1850s, Draper was Superintendent of Canal Repairs on the Cayuga and Seneca Canal. He served as a member of the Whig state central committee several times in the 1840s and 1850s, and became a Republican when the party was founded in 1854. In 1856, he was a candidate for the Republican nomination for governor, but John A. King was selected and went on to win the general election. He was one of the original Police Commissioners of the New York Metropolitan Police District when the board was established on April 16, 1857, and was chosen to serve as the board's president. Draper resigned before the end of his term after complaining that his fellow commissioners were making police department appointments based on political considerations and without consulting him.

== Civil War ==
From 1860 to 1862, Draper was the chairman of the state Republican party. From September 1862 to April 1863, Draper served during the American Civil War as Provost Marshal General of the United States Department of War. In this civilian position, Draper oversaw special provost marshals at the local level who were responsible for arresting deserters, enrolling draftees, and enlisting volunteers. Draper resigned after passage of a new law reorganizing the Provost Marshal's office and appointing deputies by Congressional district.

Draper was also an agent of the federal government with wartime responsibility for receiving cotton captured in the Confederate states, storing it, and then selling it on the government's behalf. According to allegations in a post-war Congressional investigation, Draper, who had been bankrupted by business reverses during the Panic of 1857, did not provide accurate reports on the types and amounts of cotton he sold, enabling him to divert some of the proceeds to his personal use. As a result, he was supposedly able to pay off his debts and leave a sizable estate at his death.

From September 1864 to August 1865, Draper was Collector of the Port of New York from September 1864 to August 1865. In a story recounted by David Davis, Draper obtained the collector's post after paying $20,000 (about $320,000 in 2018) to Mary Todd Lincoln so that she would persuade her husband to appoint him to this lucrative post. Draper and Mrs. Lincoln both denied Davis's claim, and nothing was ever proved against them.

== Death ==
Draper died in Whitestone, Queens County, New York on November 6, 1866. He was interred in the Draper family vault at Trinity Church Cemetery in Manhattan.

== Family ==
Simeon Draper was a descendant of early Massachusetts settler James Draper.

On October 30, 1834, he married Frances S. Haggerty Draper, daughter of John Haggerty, with whom he had five children: Marie (b. 1835); Fanny (b. 1837); John Haggerty (1839-1890); Julian (b. 1841, died as an infant); and Henry (1843-1898).

William B. Draper was his brother. Notable descendants include great-grandsons William Draper Lewis and Francis Draper Lewis.

== Sources ==
=== Books ===
- Alexander, DeAlva Stanley (1906). A Political History of the State of New York. Vol. II. New York, NY: Henry Holt and Company.
- Burlingame, Michael (2000). At Lincoln's Side: John Hay's Civil War Correspondence and Selected Writings. Carbondale, IL: Southern Illinois University Press. ISBN 978-0-8093-2711-9.
- Cottrell, Phillip (2012) [1985]. Investment Banking in England 1856-1881. Vol. I. New York, NY: Routledge. ISBN 9781136301476.
- Craughwell, Thomas J. (2011). Presidential Payola: The True Stories of Monetary Scandals in the Oval Office. Beverly, MA: Fair Winds Press. ISBN 978-1-5923-3451-3.
- Draper, Thomas W. (1892). The Drapers In America. New York, NY: John Polhemus Printing Company.
- New York State Legislature (1860). Laws of the State of New York Passed at the Eighty-Third Session of the Legislature. Vol. 1. Albany, NY: W. C. Little.
- New York State Senate (1850). Testimony: Cayuga and Seneca Canal. Documents of the Senate of the State of New York, Seventy-Third Session. Vol. II. Albany, NY: Weed, Parsons & Co.
- Richardson, James F. (1970). The New York Police: Colonial Times to 1901. New York, NY: Oxford University Press.
- U.S. House of Representatives (1858). Wilkins' or Willett's Point Investigation: Reports of Committees of the House of Representatives Made During The First Session of the Thirty-Fifth Congress. Washington, DC: James B. Steedman.
- U.S. Senate (1872). Report on the Condition of Affairs in the Late Insurrectionary States. Washington, DC: US Government Printing Office.
- Weed, Thurlow; Parsons, John D. (1865). Civil List and Forms of Government of the Colony and State of New York. Albany, NY: Weed, Parsons and Company.

=== Newspapers ===
- "Funeral of Simeon Draper". Philadelphia Age. Philadelphia, PA. November 12, 1866 – via NewspaperArchive.com.

=== Internet ===
- "Administrative History Note". War Department. Provost Marshal General's Bureau. 3/3/1863-8/28/1866: Organization Authority Record. College Park, MD: National Archives and Records Administration.

Party political offices
Preceded by James Kelly	Chairman of the New York Republican State Committee; 1860–1862	Succeeded by Henry R. Low
Government offices
Preceded by Hiram Barney	Collector of the Port of New York; 1864–1865	Succeeded by Preston King
