= Phleger =

Phleger may refer to:

- Phleger Dome, a mountain in Antarctica
- Phleger Estate, a park in San Mateo County, California
- Herman Phleger (1890-1984), San Francisco attorney, namesake of the Phleger Estate
- Brobeck, Phleger & Harrison, a former law firm in San Francisco, California
- Kelley Phleger, current wife (since 1999) of actor Don Johnson, former long-time girlfriend of Gavin Newsom
