= Same-sex immigration policy of the United States =

The United States policy regarding same-sex immigration denied couples in same-sex relationships the same rights and privileges afforded different-sex couples based on several court decisions and the Defense of Marriage Act (DOMA) until the U.S. Supreme Court ruled Section 3 of DOMA unconstitutional in United States v. Windsor on June 26, 2013.

== Background ==
In 1967, the Supreme Court of the United States ruled that a homosexual individual could be deported from the United States on the grounds of "psychopathic personality" in Boutilier v. Immigration and Naturalization Service, based on a 1952 statute. This was abrogated in the Immigration Act of 1990, which rejected sexual orientation as a qualification for immigration.

In 1982, the United States Court of Appeals for the Ninth Circuit ruled in Adams v. Howerton, 673 F.2d 1036 (9th Cir. 1982), that for the purposes of immigration law the term "spouse" as used in the Immigration and Nationality Act referred to an opposite-sex partner, and that the definition met rational basis review. It was one of the first lawsuits to seek recognition of a same-sex marriage by the federal government. The Supreme Court declined to hear an appeal of that decision.

In 2011, before the federal government recognized same-sex marriage, one study estimated that the U.S. had about 28,500 same-sex couples in which only one person was a U.S. citizen and another 11,500 same-sex couples in which neither person was a citizen.

== Defense of Marriage Act ==
Beginning in 1996, section 3 of the Defense of Marriage Act (DOMA) prevented the federal government from recognizing the marriages of same-sex couples on the same basis as the marriages of different-sex couples. Under DOMA, persons in same-sex marriages were not considered married for immigration purposes. U.S. citizens and permanent residents in same-sex marriages could not petition for their spouses, nor could they be accompanied by their spouses into the U.S. on the basis of a family or employment-based visa. A non-citizen in such a marriage could not use it as the basis for obtaining a waiver or relief from removal from the U.S. The United States Citizenship and Immigration Services (USCIS) reaffirmed its policy of denying green card applications in such cases in March 2011.

With respect to obtaining a visitor's visa, the Bureau of Immigration rules treated bi-national same-sex spouses the same as bi-national opposite-sex unmarried partners under the classification "cohabiting partners".

Challenges to USCIS decisions met with mixed results, sometimes succeeding only by enlisting the support of an important legislator. There were a number of legal challenges to DOMA as applied to immigration law. In June 2012, immigration rights advocate Lavi Soloway said that recent legal maneuvers by the Board of Immigration Appeals (BIA) suggested it was "essentially setting the stage for being able to approve [green card] petitions in a post-DOMA universe."

== Legislation ==
Legislation to establish immigration equality, the Uniting American Families Act (UAFA), has been introduced in the U.S. Congress since 2000. The latest version of the legislation, H.R. 1537, S. 821, would amend the Immigration and Nationality Act to permit permanent partners of United States citizens and of lawful permanent residents to obtain lawful permanent resident status in the same manner as spouses of citizens and of lawful permanent residents. It would also penalize the use of fraudulent permanent partnerships to evade immigration law and provide for the review of a sponsored partner's legal immigrant status if the partnership ends within two years. At the end of the 112th Congress in January 2013, UAFA had 144 cosponsors of UAFA in the House of Representatives and 29 in the Senate.

Since the legislation was first introduced, it has been expanded to provide rights to the children or stepchildren of the foreign-born partner, and has been included as Title II of the Reuniting Families Act (H.R. 1796), a broader immigration reform bill, last introduced in the United States House of Representatives on May 6, 2011, by Representative Michael Honda (D-CA).

Advocates for the legislation have identified 22 countries that recognize same-sex couples under their immigration law, including France, Germany, Israel, and the United Kingdom.

=== Immigration rights for transgender people ===
The Defense of Marriage Act did not provide a legal definition of man or woman. Until 2002, USCIS tended to recognize marriages that included a transgender partner if those marriages were considered valid in the jurisdiction where the marriage was established. Beginning in 2002, USCIS rejected all applications of couples in which one partner was transgender, which became formal policy in 2004. Later that year, the Board of Immigration Appeals (BIA) rejected the policy in a non-precedential decision.

In 2005, the precedential ruling in In re Lovo-Lara, BIA established a precedent that invalidated the 2004 policy of rejecting all marriage applications in which one of the partners was transgender. That ruling stipulated that USCIS had to determine whether a marriage was valid in the location where it was established as well as in the location where the couple resided. The ruling of the BIA was made official in 2009 and revised in 2012. Under these rules, immigration first has to determine whether the marriage is a heterosexual or same-sex marriage in the state the couple enjoined the marriage, then the same for the state the couple resides in, and finally they have to determine whether the marriage is valid under the DOMA. Although this resolved the issue of immigration for heterosexual couples from states and countries where they could get married, same-sex couples remained barred from immigration based on marriage just as other same-sex couples.

The rules let to the advice from lawyers to postpone transitioning in order to gain permanent residence based on marriage when the couples would be a same-sex couple after transitioning even when they have a valid heterosexual marriage. In 2012, this approach was challenged by a same-sex couple who got married in Texas in 2010 where they are considered a heterosexual couple under the ruling in Littleton v. Prange. Their petition was originally rejected by immigration, but in January 2013, in a non precedential decision, the Board of Immigration Appeals remanded the case back to USCIS with instructions to apply the rules set forth in In re Lovo-Lara, and determine whether the couple had a valid marriage under the laws of the State of Texas. The case was held up by USCIS until the US supreme court struck down Section 3 of DOMA in June 2013.

Once the U.S. Supreme Court ruling in United States v. Windsor ended enforcement of Section 3 of DOMA in June 2013, couples in which a partner is transgender are treated the same as all other couples for the purposes of immigration.

== Advocacy ==
Immigration Equality, founded in 1994, is an advocacy organization working for equal rights for LGBT and HIV-positive individuals with respect to policies maintained by the U.S. Citizenship and Immigration Services (formerly the Immigration and Naturalization Service).

On December 11, 2012, more than 50 LGBT advocacy groups and immigration rights groups asked President Obama to put a hold on immigration cases involving Americans seeking legal residency visas for foreign-born spouses of the same sex, pending Supreme Court action in United States v. Windsor, a case which challenges the constitutionality of DOMA section 3.

According to Immigration Equality, an advocacy organization, in 2009 there were roughly 36,000 bi-national same-sex couples unable to secure green cards for one partner. The census recorded 594,391 same-sex couples, six percent composed of one citizen and one non-citizen. A 2006 report compiled by Human Rights Watch and Immigration Equality documented the cases of couples who did not report their participation in a same-sex relationship to the 2000 U.S. Census because they feared anti-LGBT bias in the immigration process or because their foreign partners were living in the United States illegally.

== United States v. Windsor ==
The Supreme Court's decision in United States v. Windsor on June 26, 2013, ruling Section 3 of DOMA unconstitutional was recognized as ending the disparate treatment of same-sex and different-sex couples in matters of immigration. Before the decision Senator John McCain said: "If the Supreme Court throws out DOMA, then those rights are gonna be there." Following the decision, Senator Patrick Leahy announced he no longer saw a need for legislation addressing the needs of same-sex couples under immigration law. Department of Homeland Security Secretary Janet Napolitano said: "[W]e will implement today's decision so that all married couples will be treated equally and fairly in the administration of our immigration laws".

On the day Windsor was decided, a judge suspended deportation proceedings in the case of the Colombian husband of an American man. Two days later, a Florida man learned that his application for a green card for his Bulgarian husband had been approved.

Former U.S. Attorney General Alberto R. Gonzales and David N. Strange, an immigration lawyer, called Napolitano's action "not consistent with the law". They cited the Windsor decision's own emphasis on same-sex marriages as defined by the states for state purposes, while immigration is an entirely federal matter. They noted that the Ninth Circuit's decision in Adams v. Howerton (1982), which the same court cited in 2010, held the word spouse as used in immigration law can not be read to mean same-sex spouse. They advised that "Congress ... should also take up the issue of immigration benefits for same-sex couples, to provide clarity given the legal uncertainty around this matter. The Supreme Court has not settled this question, and the Obama administration should not act as though it has."
