= Adrian S. Fisher =

American lawyer (1914–1983)

- Born: January 21, 1914; Memphis, Tennessee
- Died: March 18, 1983 (aged 69); Washington, D.C.
- Education: Princeton University (BA); Harvard University (LLB)
- Occupations: Gov't Attorney, Diplomat, Law School Dean
- Spouse: Laura Graham Fisher

Adrian S. Fisher

4th Legal Adviser of the Department of State
- In office June 28, 1949 – January 27, 1953
- Preceded by: Ernest A. Gross
- Succeeded by: Herman Phleger

Adrian Sanford Fisher (January 21, 1914 – March 18, 1983) was an American lawyer and federal public servant, who served from the late 1930s through the early 1980s. He was associated with the Department of War and Department of State throughout his professional career. He participated in the U.S. government's decision to carry out Japanese-American internment and the international (1945–46) Nuremberg trial, and in State Department Cold War activities during the Harry S. Truman administration. He was the State Department Legal Adviser under Secretary of State Dean Acheson. During the John F. Kennedy, Lyndon B. Johnson and Jimmy Carter administrations, Fisher was directly involved in the negotiations of international nuclear testing and non-proliferation agreements.

== Early life and early government career ==
Fisher was born in Memphis, Tennessee, to Hubert Fisher and Louise Sanford Fisher. He attended elite schools such as Saint Albans and Choate, Princeton University (BA 1934) and Harvard Law School (LLB 1937). Fisher was known throughout his life by his nickname "Butch", from his early days as a football player for Princeton, lettering in 1933.

In the late 1930s Fisher lived in Arlington, Virginia, in an estate known by the name of Hockley Hall. This house was a semi-famous "bachelor's house," with rooms rented by Fisher and various housemates such as William Bundy, William Sheldon, John Ferguson, John Oakes, Donald Hiss, Edward Prichard, Jr. and Philip Graham. Also, Hockley Hall was known as a social venue for the likes of Dean Acheson, Archibald MacLeish and Francis Biddle.

Fisher was admitted to the Tennessee Bar in 1938, and had the distinction of clerking for two U.S. Supreme Court Justices, Louis Brandeis (1938–39) and Felix Frankfurter (1939–40). Fisher began his legal career with his appointment as law clerk to Supreme Court Justice Louis Brandeis, who was then 82 years old. In early 1939, Brandeis announced his retirement from the Supreme Court, and Fisher was invited to transfer to the chambers of the recently appointed Supreme Court Justice Felix Frankfurter. Following his term as Frankfurter's clerk in 1940, Fisher joined the United States Department of State as the assistant chief of the Foreign Funds Control Division of the State Department, where he served until shortly after the Japanese attack on Pearl Harbor.

== World War II government and military service ==
In early 1942, Fisher and John J. McCloy were assigned to assist implementation of the United States War Department's legal activities for the Japanese American internment programs shortly after the United States entered World War II. In late 1942, Fisher received an officer's commission, and trained as a bomber navigator in the United States Army Air Forces from 1942 to 1943, with missions over France, Belgium and Germany. In 1944, he returned to Washington, D.C. as an assistant to the Assistant Secretary of War, John J. McCloy.

=== Korematsu Supreme Court Case ===
In 1944, Fisher again was required to become involved in the U.S. 1942-43 internment of Japanese Americans on the West Coast of the United States upon his return from Europe. At that time, the case of Korematsu v. United States, challenging the U.S. government's power to exclude citizens of Japanese ancestry from military zones, came before the United States Supreme Court. While the Department of Justice's Herbert Wechsler (an Assistant Attorney General) was in charge of defending the government's position before the Supreme Court, significant consultation with Fisher was required, as he was again with the legal affairs section of the War Department. During this period, Fisher was involved in critical drafting of the government's brief submitted to the Supreme Court.

=== Nuremberg international trial ===
In 1945 and 1946, Captain Fisher served, along with James H. Rowe, as a legal advisor to former U.S. Attorney General Francis Biddle, the United States member of the International Military Tribunal (Nuremberg Trial). Fisher was principal drafter of the Tribunal's memorandum on the Nazi leadership's "conspiracies to engage in crimes against peace." This document, covering the period from 1920 to November 1937, demonstrated that the pace of re-armament under Adolf Hitler showed that the Germans "were developing an economic system which was only sensible only if there should be a war."

== Return to Washington, D.C. and service with Dean Acheson ==
Upon his return from Europe and exit from the Army Air Force, Fisher served as Solicitor for the U.S. Department of Commerce from 1947 to 1948. Thereafter, Fisher became general counsel of the Atomic Energy Commission from 1948-49. He then served as legal advisor (with the rank of Assistant Secretary of State) to the Department of State (serving in the office of Secretary of State Dean Acheson) from 1949 to 1953. During 1952, Mr. Fisher also served as legal advisor to the U.S. Delegation to the United Nations in Paris.

In 1952, Fisher was also appointed by President Harry S. Truman as an original commissioner to the President's Commission on Immigration and Naturalization. The Commission was established in the Executive Office of the President by Executive Order 10392 "Establishing the President's Commission on Immigration and Naturalization". The specific context for the 1952 commission was the enactment of the McCarren-Walter Act, which was passed over President Truman's veto. Truman's main disagreement with the Act was its retention of the quota system that began in 1924. After Congress passed the Act over his veto, he formed the Commission and charged it with looking into new options for immigration and naturalization policy.

Secretary of State Acheson's appointment of Fisher as the State Department's Legal Adviser was unique at the time, because of the closeness of the Acheson/Fisher professional relationship. Fisher's role as Acheson's legal adviser was explained by Michael H. Cordozo, the State Department's Assistant Legal Adviser for Economic Affairs, 1950-52:

(Acheson) insisted on having, as a legal adviser, a lawyer whose ability as a lawyer and whose judgment in politics and statesmanship could be greatly respected. He got Adrian Fisher for that, and he involved him in all of the political and other activities that he himself was involved in. The Secretary of State always is involved in a lot of controversial things, and here we had the McCarthy era, the attack on the whole concept of Foreign Service and the State Department, and a terrific controversy over what to do about China, who had "lost China." Fisher was always at Acheson's right hand when he was dealing with other people about these things. Wherever he went, Fisher's office was backstopping him, getting all the necessary background information so he'd be prepared for any kind of question that came up. Of course, Acheson's own approach to being Secretary of State was such that when you took an agreement to him to be signed, his chief question was "By what authority do I sign this?" And whoever brought it to him to get it signed, had to be ready with the answer that would satisfy a lawyer -- "by what legal authority" -- as well as what it provides and so forth.

=== Building the H-bomb ===
In late 1949, President Truman asked Dean Acheson to concentrate on the question of whether the United States should develop the hydrogen bomb. Acheson formed a working group under the United States National Security Council (NSC) executive secretary Sidney Souers, consisting of R. Gordon Arneson, Paul Nitze and Fisher, who served as the State Department's legal adviser on the project. It was Arneson's view that each member of the working group were of one mind. He said, "The four principals in the State Department were Acheson, Nitze, Fisher and myself. I don't think it was necessary for any one of us to persuade anybody else; we all were of a mind that there really wasn't any choice."

Fisher was part of this same working group which recommended that an internal NSC study be conducted on the overall U.S. foreign policy as it pertained to the newly developing Cold War. This classified study (declassified in 1975) called NSC 68, was the blueprint for the Truman Doctrine for containment of communism, which provided the overall policy concepts for the U.S. participation in the Cold War throughout the 1950s.

=== Congressional Hearings on the firing of General Douglas MacArthur ===
On April 11, 1951, President Truman announced the dismissal of General Douglas MacArthur from his duties as Allied Commander of United Nations forces in the Far East. Following MacArthur's firing and the subsequent public outcry, the Joint Committee on Armed Services and Foreign Relations of the United States Senate conducted an inquiry into removal of MacArthur. Fisher was assigned the responsibility for the coordination of the State Department Congressional testimony regarding the firing of General MacArthur.

=== Fisher and the Acheson Capitol Hill fist-fight ===
In August 1950, Fisher was involved in an incident between Secretary of State Dean Acheson and Senator Kenneth S. Wherry, Nebraska Republican and minority whip of the United States Senate, during a hearing before the Senate Foreign Relations Committee. During the hearing, Senator Wherry began to harangue Acheson about events in Korea. Suddenly, Acheson jumped out of his chair towards Wherry, with fists raised. Fisher was required to physically hold Acheson back from striking Wherry. As the incident was told by eye-witness John H. Ohly, then the Assistant Director, Office of International Security Affairs, Department of State,

The next day the administration threw in its big guns -- Secretary Acheson, Louis Johnson, and, from ECA, William Foster. This time the going was really rough from the Republican side of the table and Acheson consciously lost his temper over some of Wherry's remarks and got up and tried to slug him. Adrian Fisher, State Department Legal Adviser and a close friend of Acheson, caught his arm, fortunately, because Acheson would have missed Wherry by about three feet and probably fallen flat on his face on the floor. It was a great show.

This scene was portrayed in the film The Manchurian Candidate, with Frank Sinatra (as Major Marco) taking on Fisher's role of restraining (in that instance) the United States Secretary of Defense.

== Nuclear arms control and disarmament activities ==
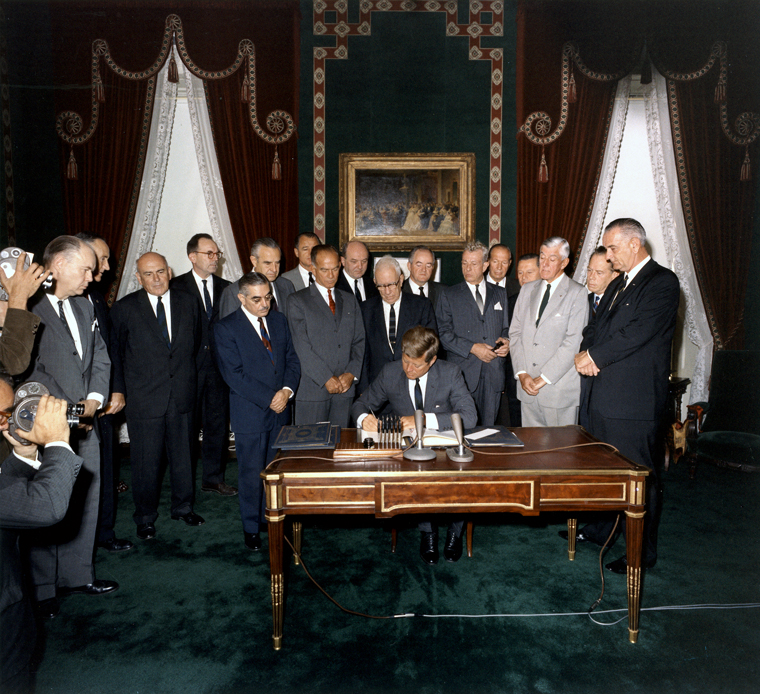
October 7, 1963, President Kennedy signs the Limited Nuclear Test Ban Treaty. Fisher is fourth from top left. White House, Treaty Room. Photograph by Robert Knudsen, White House Photographer

From 1961 to 1968, Fisher served as the Deputy Director of the U.S. Arms Control and Disarmament Agency in which he took a primary negotiations role during the Atomic Test Ban Treaty of 1963 between the U.S. and the Soviet Union. At that time he was Deputy to John J. McCloy, Adviser to the President on Disarmament. In 1968, Fisher served as one of the chief U.S. negotiators of the Nuclear Non-Proliferation Treaty, which was signed by the United States, the United Kingdom, the Soviet Union, and 59 other countries on July 1, 1968. A collection of letters from Adrian Fisher to President Johnson and Secretary of State Dean Rusk regarding his perception and activities on arms control and disarmament is maintained by the Federation of American Scientists.

== Return to private law practice and academics ==
In 1968, Fisher re-entered private law practice, again with Covington & Burling (during the Dwight D. Eisenhower Administration (1953–60) Fisher joined the Covington firm, with Dean Acheson, for the first time) and became General Counsel to The Washington Post''. Fisher's connection with The Washington Post arose because of his close friendship with the Post's then-owner Philip Graham since his early days in Washington, D.C. Both Fisher and Graham had clerked for Supreme Court Justice Felix Frankfurter and had shared a rented house (belonging to future Secretary of State Dean Acheson), together with Donald Hiss (brother of Alger Hiss). From 1969 to 1975, Fisher served as Dean of Georgetown University Law Center, Washington, D.C. According to a report in the Georgetown student newspaper "The Hoya", Fisher was not solicited as a candidate for the position, but simply submitted his own name. "I heard they were looking around for a new person, so I called up and asked to be considered." Dean Fisher was installed as the first occupant of the Francis Cabell Brown Chair in International Law of the center on January 25, 1977, and served as law professor from 1977 to 1980.

== U.S. Disarmament Representative ==
President Jimmy Carter nominated Fisher for the rank of ambassador while serving as the U.S. representative to the Conference of the Committee on Disarmament in 1977, where he served through 1981. With the United States represented by Fisher, the first Special Session on Disarmament of the United Nations General Assembly was held in 1978 and led to the established in 1979 of the U.N. Conference on Disarmament as the single multilateral disarmament negotiating forum of the international community.

== Return to academics ==
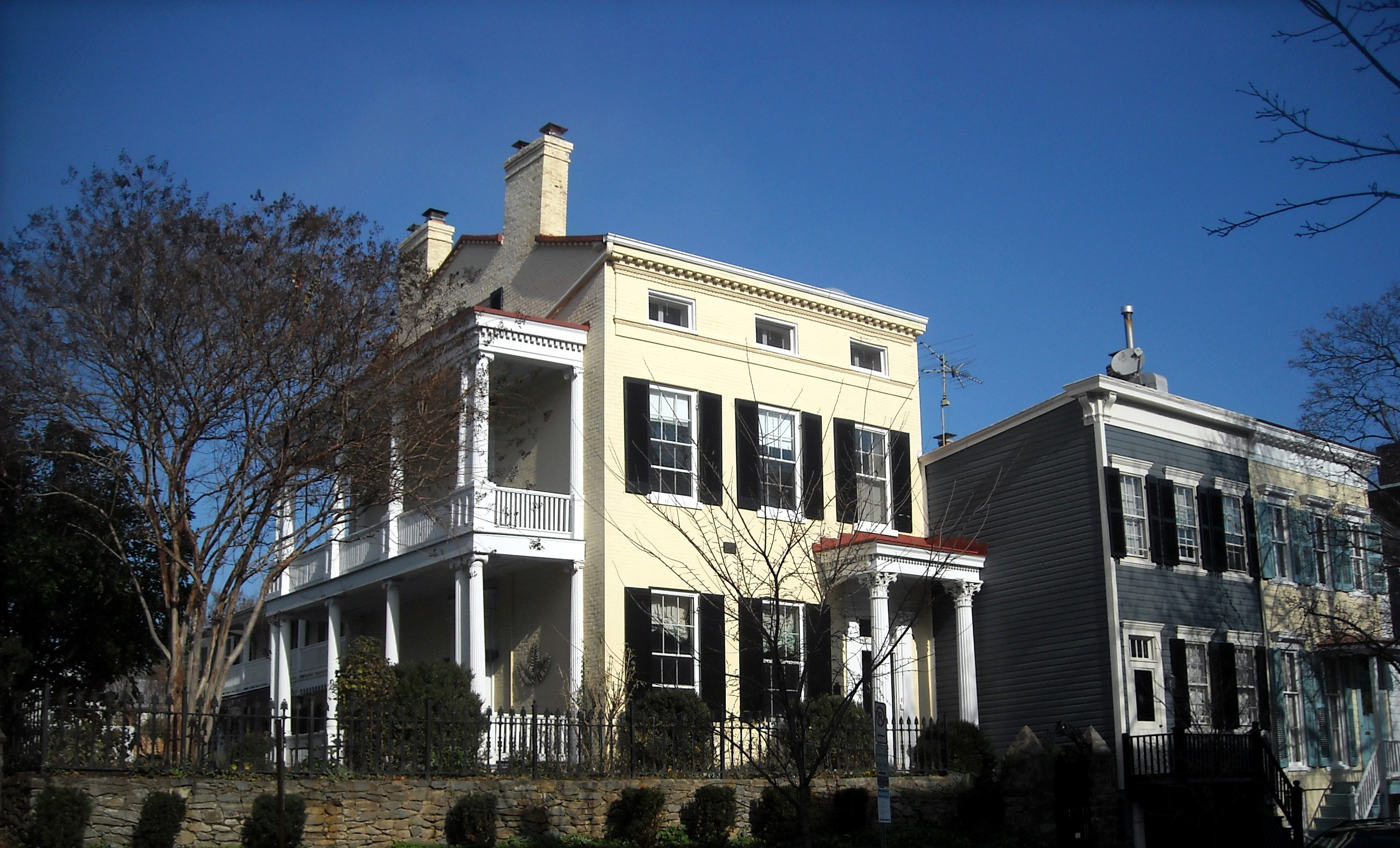
Fisher's former residence in Georgetown, Washington, D.C.

In 1981, Fisher joined the faculty of George Mason University School of Law in Arlington, Virginia, teaching various seminars on negotiation tactics. From 1981 to 1982, Mr. Fisher also served as an advisor to John J. McCloy during the hearings of the Commission on Wartime Relocation and Internment of Civilians (established by Congress in 1980). This commission reviewed the impact of Executive Order 9066 on Japanese-Americans and determined that they were the victims of discrimination by the Federal government. Fisher died on March 18, 1983, aged 69, from cancer at his home in Washington, D.C.

== See also ==
- List of law clerks for the second seat of the Supreme Court of the United States
- List of law clerks for the fourth seat of the Supreme Court of the United States

Legal offices
Preceded by Ernest A. Gross	Legal Adviser of the Department of State; June 28, 1949 – January 27, 1953	Succeeded by Herman Phleger
