= American Law Institute =

American legal advocacy group

- Abbreviation: ALI
- Formation: 1923; 103 years ago
- Founder: James DeWitt Andrews
- Type: Nonprofit
- Purpose: Legal
- Headquarters: Philadelphia, Pennsylvania, U.S.
- Director: Diane Wood
- President: Wallace B. Jefferson
- Website: ali.org

The American Law Institute (ALI) is a legal organization composed of judges, lawyers, and legal scholars, with membership limited to 3,000 elected members. It was established in 1923 with the stated purpose of promoting the clarification and simplification of United States common law and its adaptation to changing social needs. Additional stated goals included securing the better administration of justice and encouraging scholarly and scientific legal work.

ALI produces publications known as Restatements of the Law, which summarize generally accepted principles of common law as developed through state court decisions. Many courts and legislatures consult ALI's publications as authoritative reference material on a range of legal questions. Some legal scholars and jurists, including the late Supreme Court Justice Antonin Scalia, as well as some conservative commentators, have raised concerns about whether ALI's work constitutes judicial lawmaking rather than a neutral restatement of existing law.

The ALI drafts, approves, and publishes Restatements of the Law, Principles of the Law, model acts, and other proposals for law reform. The ALI is headquartered in Philadelphia, Pennsylvania.

At any given time, ALI is engaged in up to 20 active projects examining areas of law. Some projects have attracted significant media attention, particularly the ongoing revision of the Model Penal Code's sexual assault provisions.

== History ==
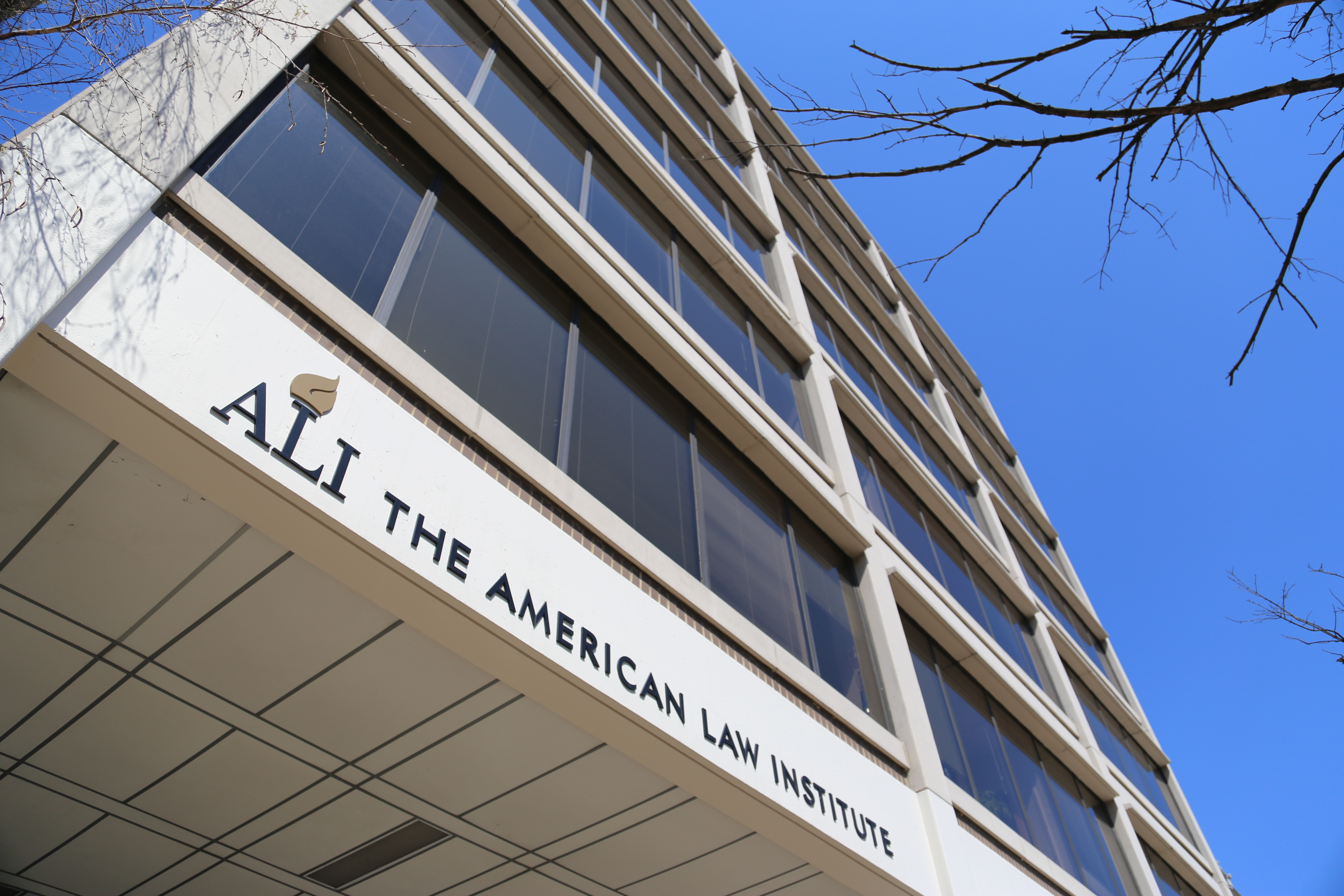
The American Law Institute's headquarters in Philadelphia

The movement that led to the founding of the American Law Institute had its origins in 1888, when Henry Taylor Terry, a law professor then teaching in Japan, wrote to the American Bar Association (ABA) recommending that it solicit proposals for a systematic arrangement of the whole body of American law. In response, the ABA established a special committee on the classification of law. James DeWitt Andrews, who chaired the committee from 1901 to 1908, launched an independent Corpus Juris project in 1910 and in 1913 founded the American Academy of Jurisprudence (AAJ) to develop the Corpus Juris in partnership with the ABA. Andrews and his supporters contended that the Corpus Juris would be more comprehensive and authoritative than existing treatises and digests, including the West American Digest System, and they regarded the attorney-editors employed on such publications as insufficiently qualified for the task.

Andrews encountered significant opposition from legal academics whose participation was essential to the project, most notably John Henry Wigmore, dean of Northwestern University School of Law. Separately from the ABA, the Association of American Law Schools (AALS) formed committees to study the creation of a national center for the study of law and jurisprudence in 1915, and a juristic center in 1916. In 1923, the ABA withdrew its support from Andrews, who was still seeking backing for the AAJ and a proposed Codex Library, and aligned instead with the AALS's proposal for the establishment of a juristic center, which ultimately led to the founding of ALI. According to one account, what united the ABA and the AALS was a shared view that Andrews and his Academy of Jurisprudence should not be entrusted with the task of classifying and restating American law.

The ALI was founded in 1923 on the initiative of William Draper Lewis, Dean of the University of Pennsylvania Law School, following a study by a group of prominent American judges, lawyers, and teachers who sought to address the uncertain and complex nature of early 20th century American law. According to the "Committee on the Establishment of a Permanent Organization for the Improvement of the Law", part of the law's uncertainty stemmed from the lack of agreement on fundamental principles of the common-law system, while the law's complexity was attributed to the numerous variations within different jurisdictions. The committee recommended that a perpetual society be formed to improve the law and the administration of justice in a scholarly and scientific manner.

The committee that issued the report recommending the Institute's formation included Elihu Root, George W. Wickersham, William Draper Lewis, Joseph Henry Beale, Benjamin N. Cardozo, Arthur Corbin, Ernst Freund, Learned Hand, Roscoe Pound, Harlan F. Stone, John Henry Wigmore, and Samuel Williston.

The organization was incorporated on February 23, 1923, at a meeting called by the committee in the auditorium of Memorial Continental Hall in Washington, D.C. According to ALI's Certificate of Incorporation, its purpose is "to promote the clarification and simplification of the law and its better adaptation to social needs, to secure the better administration of justice, and to encourage and carry on scholarly and scientific legal work".

== Publications ==
The basic approach and format of ALI publications follows a consistent pattern. An expert in the relevant field of law, typically a legal scholar, is designated as reporter. With the assistance of associates, the reporter conducts the foundational research and prepares the initial material.

A preliminary draft is then submitted to a small group of advisers (judges, lawyers, and law teachers with specialized knowledge of the subject) for suggestions and revisions. In most projects, the draft is also reviewed by a group of ALI members with a particular interest in the topic. The revised draft is subsequently submitted to the ALI Council, a body of approximately 70 prominent judges, practicing lawyers, and law teachers, for further analysis and consideration. The Council may refer the draft back to the reporter and advisers for additional review or forward it to the general ALI membership.

Once approved by the Council, the draft is presented as a tentative draft to the annual meeting of the full membership for debate and discussion. The membership may approve the draft, subject to revisions, or return it to the reporter and advisers. This process produces a series of tentative drafts over a number of years. A proposed final draft, incorporating all prior tentative drafts as modified by membership action, may then be submitted to the Council and the full membership. Upon approval by both bodies, an official text is published.

The final product reflects the review and criticism of experienced members of the bench, bar, and academia. The process may take many years; it is not unusual for a single Restatement project to require more than twenty years to complete.

=== Restatements of the Law ===
Restatements are essentially codifications of case law, common law judge-made doctrines that develop gradually over time because of the principle of stare decisis. In the nineteenth century many American jurists wanted to codify American law by statute, along the lines of the European civil codes. Some American jurists thought the Restatements might gradually become codifications. Samuel Williston, for instance, said of the Restatement of Contracts: "This Restatement . . . after [having been] put through the mill, so to speak . . . will serve as a better foundation for a Code than any country has ever had before." Although Restatements are not binding authority in and of themselves, they are highly persuasive because they are formulated over several years with extensive input from law professors, practicing attorneys, and judges. They are meant to reflect the consensus of the American legal community as to what the law is (and in some areas, what it should become). All told, the Restatement of the Law is one of the most respected and well-used sources of secondary authority, covering nearly every area of common law.

Restatements are primarily addressed to courts and aim at clear formulations of common law and its statutory elements, and reflect the law as it presently stands or might appropriately be stated by a court. Although Restatements aspire toward the precision of statutory language, they are also intended to reflect the flexibility and capacity for development and growth of the common law. That is why they are phrased in the descriptive terms of a judge announcing the law to be applied in a given case rather than in the mandatory terms of a statute.

ALI completed the Fourth Restatement of U.S. Foreign Relations Law and the Principles of Election Administration in 2017.

=== Principles of the law ===
Beginning with the Principles of Corporate Governance (issued in 1994), the American Law Institute issued studies of areas of law thought to need reform. This type of analysis typically results in a publication that recommends changes in the law. Principles of the Law issued so far include volumes on Aggregate Litigation (2010), Family Dissolution (2002), Intellectual Property (2008), Software Contracts (2010), Transnational Civil Procedure (2006; cosponsored by UNIDROIT), and Transnational Insolvency: Cooperation Among the NAFTA Countries (2003). Work in the Principles of the Law series continues with projects covering Corporate Compliance, Data Privacy, Election Law, and Government Ethics.

=== Model acts ===
ALI has also produces model acts on topics ranging from air flight, criminal procedure, evidence, federal securities law, land development, pre-arraignment procedure, to property. Some of these projects were undertaken jointly with the National Conference of Commissioners on Uniform State Laws (NCCUSL).

The chief joint ALI-NCCUSL project is the Uniform Commercial Code (UCC), which the institute has been developing and revising with the National Conference since the 1940s. First published in 1952, the UCC is one of a number of uniform acts that have been promulgated in conjunction with efforts to harmonize the law of sales and other commercial transactions in all 50 states within the United States. The Uniform Commercial Code is generally viewed as one of the most important developments in American law, having been enacted (with local adaptations) in almost every jurisdiction.

The Model Penal Code (MPC) is another ALI statutory formulation that has been widely accepted throughout the United States. Adopted by the institute membership in 1962 after twelve years of drafting and development, the code's purpose was to stimulate and assist legislatures in making an effort to update and standardize the penal law of the United States. Primary responsibility for criminal law lies with the individual states, and such national efforts work to produce similar laws in different jurisdictions. The standard they used to make a determination of what the penal code should be was one of "contemporary reasoned judgment", meaning what a reasoned person at the time of the development of the MPC would judge the penal law to do. The chief reporter for this undertaking was Herbert Wechsler, who later became a director of the institute.

ALI completed the sentencing revision in 2017, and as of that time was still working on the sexual assault and related offenses project that re-examines Article 213 of the Model Penal Code.

== Membership ==
Membership in the American Law Institute is limited to 3,000 elected members who are judges, lawyers, and legal scholars from various practice areas. The membership includes some distinguished foreign judges, such as Lord Gill from Scotland.

=== Governance ===
The institute is governed by its council, a volunteer board of directors that oversees the management of ALI's business and projects. Having no fewer than 42 and no more than 65 members, the council consists of lawyers, judges, and academics, and reflects a broad range of specialties and experiences.

==== Presidents ====
- George W. Wickersham (1923–1936)
- George Wharton Pepper (1936–1947)
- Harrison Tweed (1947–1961)
- Norris Darrell (1961–1976)
- R. Ammi Cutter (1976–1980)
- Roswell B. Perkins (1980–1993)
- Charles Alan Wright (1993–2000)
- Michael Traynor (2000–2008)
- Roberta Cooper Ramo (2008–2017)
- David F. Levi (2017–2026)
- Wallace B. Jefferson (2026–present)

==== Directors ====
- William Draper Lewis (1923–1947)
- Herbert Funk Goodrich (1947–1962)
- Herbert Wechsler (1963–1984)
- Geoffrey C. Hazard, Jr. (1984–1999)
- Lance Liebman (1999–2014)
- Richard Revesz (2014–2023)
- Diane Wood (2023–present)

== See also ==
- Henry J. Friendly Medal
- Arthur Linton Corbin
- SEARCH, The National Consortium for Justice Information and Statistics
