= UAFA =

UAFA may stand for:

- Uniting American Families Act, a U.S. bill to amend the Immigration and Nationality Act
- Union of Arab Football Associations, a football association that organises several tournaments between Arab nations
