= Herbert Funk Goodrich =

American judge (1889–1962)

Judge of the United States Court of Appeals for the Third Circuit
- In office May 10, 1940 – June 25, 1962
- Appointed by: Franklin D. Roosevelt
- Preceded by: Francis Biddle
- Succeeded by: Abraham Lincoln Freedman

Personal details
- Born: July 29, 1889 Anoka, Minnesota, U.S.
- Died: June 25, 1962 (aged 72)
- Education: Carleton College (AB); Harvard Law School (LLB)

Herbert Funk Goodrich (July 29, 1889 – June 25, 1962) was a United States circuit judge of the United States Court of Appeals for the Third Circuit. He was also Dean of the University of Pennsylvania Law School.

== Education and career ==
Born on July 29, 1889, in Anoka, Minnesota, Goodrich received an Artium Baccalaureus degree in 1911 from Carleton College and a Bachelor of Laws in 1914 from Harvard Law School. He was a faculty member at the State University of Iowa (now the University of Iowa) from 1914 to 1922, as an instructor in law from 1914 to 1915, an Assistant Professor from 1915 to 1919, Professor from 1919 to 1921 and as Acting Dean of the State University of Iowa College of Law (now the University of Iowa College of Law) from 1921 to 1922. He was a Professor of Law at the University of Michigan from 1922 to 1929.

He was a faculty member at the University of Pennsylvania Law School from 1929 to 1948. He served as Dean and Professor of Law from 1929 to 1940, Vice President from 1931 to 1940, and as a lecturer in law from 1940 to 1948.

Goodrich was elected to the American Philosophical Society in 1937 and the American Academy of Arts and Sciences in 1939.

In 1939, Goodrich was the Democratic nominee for the Supreme Court of Pennsylvania. He was narrowly defeated by Republican Marion D. Patterson 226,784 votes to 222,553.

== Federal judicial service ==
Goodrich was nominated by President Franklin D. Roosevelt on March 5, 1940, to a seat on the United States Court of Appeals for the Third Circuit vacated by Judge Francis Biddle. He was confirmed by the United States Senate on May 7, 1940, and received his commission on May 10, 1940. His service terminated on June 25, 1962, due to his death.

== Other service ==
Goodrich served as the Director of the American Law Institute and chaired the drafting committee for the original version of the Uniform Commercial Code. He would remain Director of the institute until his death.

== Sources ==
Academic offices
Preceded by William Ephraim Mikell	Dean of the University of Pennsylvania Law School; 1929–1940	Succeeded by Edwin R. Keedy
Preceded by William Draper Lewis	Director of the American Law Institute; 1947–1962	Succeeded by Herbert Wechsler
Legal offices
Preceded by Francis Biddle	Judge of the United States Court of Appeals for the Third Circuit; 1940–1962	Succeeded by Abraham Lincoln Freedman
