= Geneva Summit (1955) =

Cold War-era meeting in Geneva, Switzerland

Geneva Summit 1955
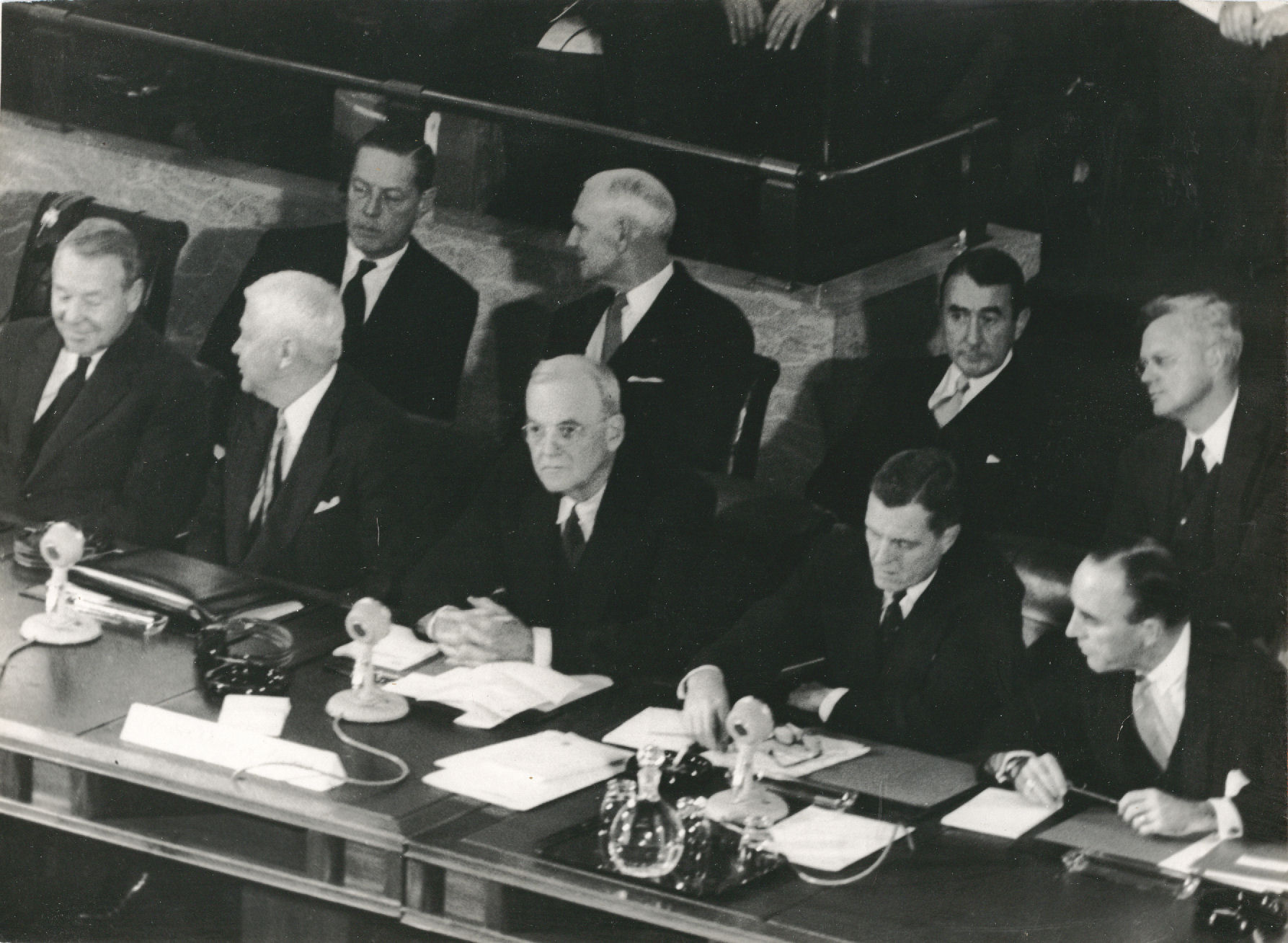
- The American delegation. On the front row, from left to right: Herman Phleger, Charles E. Wilson, John Foster Dulles, Livingston T. Merchant, Douglas MacArthur II
- Host country: Switzerland
- Date: July 18, 1955
- Cities: Geneva
- Participants: (United States) President Dwight D. Eisenhower (United Kingdom) Prime Minister Anthony Eden (France) Prime Minister Edgar Faure (Soviet Union) Premier Nikolai Bulganin
- Follows: Potsdam Conference
- Precedes: Four Power Paris Summit

The Geneva Summit of 1955 was a Cold War-era meeting in Geneva, Switzerland. Held on July 18, 1955, it was a meeting of "The Big Four": President Dwight D. Eisenhower of the United States, Prime Minister Anthony Eden of Britain, Premier Nikolai A. Bulganin of the Soviet Union, and Prime Minister Edgar Faure of France. They were accompanied by the foreign ministers of the four powers (who were also members of the Council of Foreign Ministers): John Foster Dulles, Harold Macmillan, Vyacheslav Molotov, and Antoine Pinay. Also in attendance was Nikita Khrushchev, de facto leader of the Soviet Union.

This was the first such meeting since the Potsdam Conference ten years earlier.

The purpose was to bring together world leaders to begin discussions on peace. Although those discussions led down many different roads (arms negotiations, trade barriers, diplomacy, nuclear warfare, etc.), the talks were influenced by the common goal for increased global security.

== Mission ==
The stated mission of the 1955 summit was to reduce international tensions. The Geneva Summit was seen as an extremely important building block to better friendships and more open communication between the leaders of "The Big Four". The creation of an international community was introduced as a way to help relieve global tensions and mistrust. This community would form the critical foundation of a unified world in which minimal barriers to trade and common interests would serve to engender diplomacy. This Summit paved the way for further discussion regarding international relations and cooperation, preceding other significant summits such as SALT I and the Washington Summit of 1973.

Topics such as east–west trade agreements, tariffs, the arms race, international security and disarmament policy were all addressed to some extent. The most significant proposal made by President Eisenhower was his "Open Skies" plan, which called for an international aerial monitoring system. The intent of this policy was to prevent nations from stockpiling dangerous weapons, and eventually lead to the disarmament of all weapons of mass destruction. Surprisingly, one goal that American political advisers had for the conference was to not make any specific promises or guarantees to the Soviets. In the past, Soviet leaders had later misinterpreted American suggestions as whole-hearted promises, which could serve to bring more division instead of unity. Since this meeting was the first of its kind, the seeds of unification needed to be planted, nothing else.

The issue of east–west trade agreements was one that needed to be discussed very delicately. All previous east–west trade agreement talks had been anything but diplomatic. In the past, trade agreements had always been an occasion for discourse and heated arguments. Neither the UK nor the U.S. was willing to share control of their trading spheres unless there were obvious strategic advantages of doing so. Nations were at a standstill because no one was willing to compromise for the good of the worldwide community. The problem with peace talks is that although each nation knows the importance and benefits of peace, there is never enough mutual trust to ensure the success of such talks. The talks in Geneva helped break the ice and introduce nations to the benefits of global free trade. Also, simply by meeting and talking, the leaders were able to develop relationships and have an optimistic outlook on a peaceful and cooperative future.

== Cold War and Geneva ==
The Cold War had a major impact on the topics debated during the Geneva Summit. International tensions were at their peak during the Cold War; as tensions were on the rise, the Cold War leaders thought it would be a good idea to unite under a common cause for peace in Geneva.

The world leaders discussed issues on security, armaments, German unification, and stronger east–west relationships. Khrushchev was willing to allow a united Germany providing it was neutral, but West German entrance into NATO in May made the situation increasingly complicated. This conference marked an era of renewed optimism in cold war relationships, however this was disrupted later by the Suez Crisis.

== See also ==
- 1954 Geneva Conference
- List of Soviet Union–United States summits (1943 to 1991)
