= Herman Phleger =

American attorney and politician

5th Legal Adviser of the Department of State
- In office February 2, 1953 – April 1, 1957
- Preceded by: Adrian S. Fisher
- Succeeded by: Loftus Becker

Personal details
- Born: September 5, 1890 Sacramento, California, US
- Died: November 21, 1984 (aged 94) San Mateo County, California, US
- Resting place: Cypress Lawn Memorial Park
- Spouse: Mary Elena (nee Macondray)
- Parent(s): Charles Wilhelm Phleger; Mary Phleger (nee McCrory)
- Education: University of California, Berkeley; Harvard University

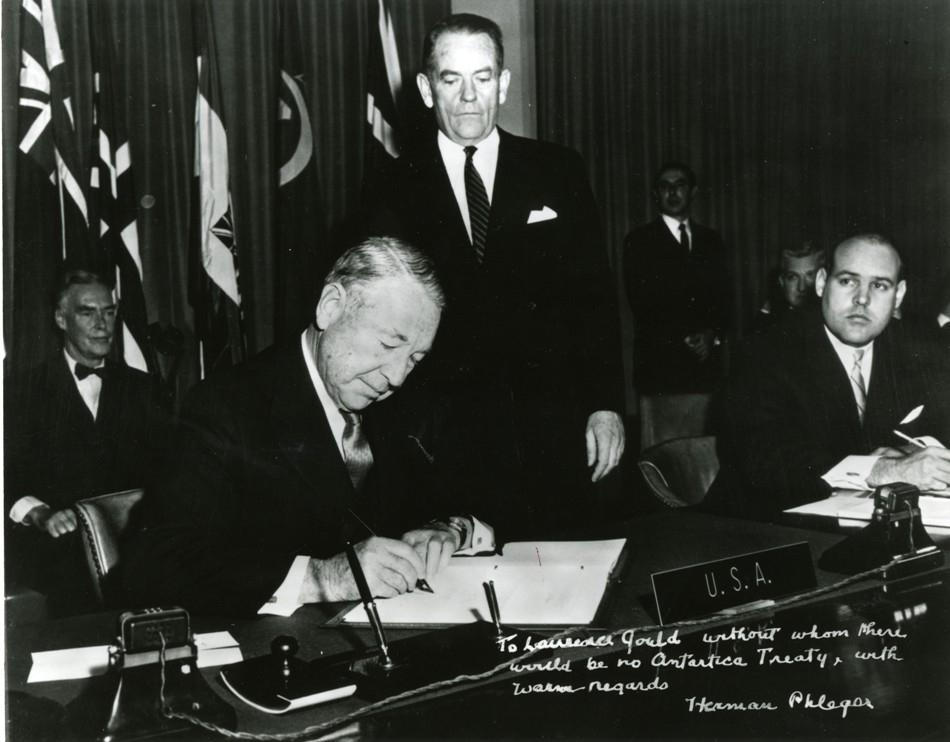
Herman Phleger signs the Antarctic Treaty on behalf of the United States in December 1959

Herman Phleger (September 5, 1890 – November 21, 1984) was an American attorney and politician who served as Legal Adviser of the Department of State from February 2, 1953, to April 1, 1957, under President Dwight D. Eisenhower. He succeeded Adrian S. Fisher and was succeeded by Loftus Becker. In 1959, he negotiated and signed the Antarctic Treaty on behalf of the United States. He is the namesake of the Phleger Estate.

== Early life ==
Herman Phleger was born in Sacramento, California, on September 5, 1890. His mother, Mary McCrory, was born in New Orleans, Louisiana, around 1866, to an Irish immigrant mother and an unknown Confederate soldier. His father, Charles Wilhelm Phleger, was born in Findlay, Ohio, around 1857, to German immigrant parents. Charles and Mary met in Sacramento in about 1885, where he managed ranches for Senator James Graham Fair, and she worked as a housekeeper in the Union House Hotel. The couple had three children.

On March 12, 1892, when Herman was two years old, his father was murdered in a Sacramento saloon. The family was left with little cash, but significant real estate interests. Herman's mother Mary worked as a schoolteacher. The family lived in the center of town, providing the children with significant exposure to social and political life. As a boy, Herman saw "prize fights" between Joe Gans and Stanley Ketchel, and speeches by William Jennings Bryan. He also enjoyed minstrel shows, particularly the work of the local Looney Minstrels troop.

Herman was baptized Catholic, but never practiced Catholicism, and grew up attending Sunday school at the local Congregational Church. His attendance was primarily due to "the prospect of winning some sort of reward," and he described himself as "not much of a prospect for religion."

As a young man, Herman delivered newspapers for the San Francisco Examiner, and worked part time as a bill collector. For two years in high school, he was head chainman of a state surveying crew working on what is now U.S. Route 50. During the summers, he operated a hand truck at the Central California Canneries at 6th and B Streets. In the summer of 1906 he was hired by the Southern Pacific Railroad to list and identify incoming west-bound freight cars at the Rocklin junction.

Herman demonstrated an interest in politics from a young age. As a boy, he "participated in most elections to the extent of passing out bills and pamphlets." As a teen, he enjoyed watching California State Legislature proceedings from the gallery, where he met Governors James N. Gillett, George C. Pardee, and Hiram Johnson.

== Education ==
As a child, Herman attended Sacramento public schools. While in grammar school, he met future National Park Service Director Newton Drury, and the two remained lifelong friends.

Herman attended the University of California, Berkeley, from 1910 to 1914, where he befriended General Leroy Hunt and future Chief Justice Earl Warren, whom he described as a "late bloomer." During his senior year, he began studying law at Boalt Hall. After two years, he transferred to Harvard Law School, where he completed his final year. However, due to Harvard's strict policy that students must have completed all three years at Harvard Law, Herman never actually received a law degree.

== World War I ==
World War I began shortly after Herman's graduation from Harvard, while he was on vacation with his family in Europe. For the next two years, as his law practice grew, Herman watched the events in Europe closely. On July 22, 1916, he participated in the Preparedness Day Parade, and was near Second and Market Streets when the Preparedness Day Bombing occurred.

Following the United States' declaration of war on April 6, 1917, Herman enlisted in the U.S. Navy, and was made an ensign on June 17, 1917. He was ordered to report to the San Diego Naval Training Center, where he taught close order drill for several months. On October 11, 1918, he joined the second class in the "ninety-day wonder" program, a three-month expedited course at the Officer Candidate School. Upon completion of the program, he was assigned to the destroyer USS Beale based in Queenstown (now Cobh), Ireland, where he arrived in February 1918. The ship's principal assignment was to escort troop transports and merchant ship convoys into English harbors. In 1919, the ship participated in the escort of the SS George Washington, which carried President Woodrow Wilson to the Paris Peace Conference.

Herman resigned from the Navy upon his return to the United States shortly after Christmas 1919, and returned to California to practice law.

== Legal career ==
=== Brobeck, Phleger & Harrison ===
After returning to the United States in November 1914, and before his naval service, Herman was hired as a law clerk by Morrison, Dunne & Brobeck (now Morrison & Foerster). His early clients included the California-Oregon Power Company, Yosemite Park and Curry Company, Mercantile National Bank, and Templeton Crocker. In 1917 he negotiated the construction of the Link River Dam, and was instrumental in the creation of the San Francisco War Memorial Opera House.

Herman became a partner at Morrison, Dunne & Brobeck in January 1920. In 1924, Herman convinced two senior partners, Harrison and Brobeck, that the firm would be more profitable if the other partners were ousted. In something of an office coup, the other partners were unceremoniously fired and locked out of the firm's offices at the old Crocker Building. They returned with fire axes, and hacked down the door to retrieve their clients' files.

Brobeck, Phleger & Harrison was officially formed on January 1, 1926. The firm's early clients included the Matson Navigation Company, Wells Fargo, the Pacific Gas & Electric Company, and the Crocker and Spreckels families.

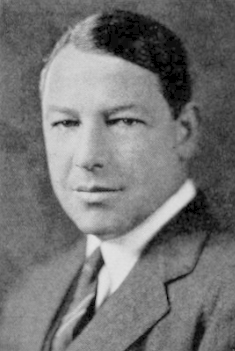
c. 1929

Throughout the 1920s, Herman began making a name for himself representing employers in their disputes with labor unions. In 1934, he represented the Waterfront Employers Association ("WEA") in their litigation against Harry Bridges' longshoremen's union. During the 1934 West Coast Waterfront Strike, he assisted James Folger and others in forming the Acme Trucking Company, a fictitious business which briefly succeeded in breaking the picket lines of the ongoing Teamsters strike. Following the violence on Bloody Thursday (which he watched from his office window), Herman argued the WEA's case before the National Longshoremen's Board. The argument was ultimately unsuccessful, and the union won out. Having earned himself the hatred of many powerful unions, Herman never left the house during this time without a sword cane or billy club.

During the 1930s and 1940s, Brobeck represented the Bethlehem Shipbuilding Corporation, the Bethlehem Steel Company, the Panama-Pacific Exposition Company (in one of the first class action suits in San Francisco), the California-Oregon Power Company, the Southern California Gas Company, John Francis Neylan, the Hearst Family, Castle & Cook, the Hawaiian Sugar Planters' Association (alongside James Garfield), the DiGiorgio Corporation, Herbert Hoover, the Key System, and the Association of American Railroads. During this time, Herman also represented the Matson Family and the Matson Navigation Company in their establishment of the Moana Hotel and Royal Hawaiian Hotel, and befriended Judge Morgan J. O'Brien.

In the late 30s, Herman became heavily involved in Hawaiian legal affairs and spent considerable time in Washington, where he became acquainted with New Deal figures Jerome Frank, Benjamin V. Cohen, and Thomas Gardiner Corcoran, whom he referred to as "very attractive, intelligent fellows with whom I didn't agree politically but who wanted to do the right thing."

When William Randolph Hearst died in 1951, Herman represented his wife Millicent Hearst in the settlement of his estate, and served as pall-bearer at his funeral.

=== Service in Postwar Germany ===
During the organization of the United Nations in San Francisco during the spring of 1945, Herman frequently met with John Foster Dulles and played tennis with John J. McCloy. Following the German surrender, McCloy asked Herman to participate in the reorganization of the conquered German government. His orders were to affect the "destruction of the Nazi party, the termination of the general staff system in the German army, the breaking up of the concentrations of economic and financial power, and the installation or adoption by the German people of democratic methods of government."

Herman arrived in Germany in July 1945. Headquartered in the former Luftwaffe building in Berlin, he worked primarily alongside Charles Fahy and J. Warren Madden, and under Generals Dwight D. Eisenhower and Lucius Clay. Their office was known as the Legal Directorate.

On August 12, 1945, Herman and Allen Dulles visited Adolf Hitler's recently abandoned bunker at the Reich Chancellory. Herman described the bunker as "in great disorder, with much water, but evidently had not been visited by many people because everything seemed quite intact," including the "couch with blood on it."

Herman's primary focus was the "breaking up of the German combines and trusts," for which he drafted an analogue of the Sherman Anti-Trust Act, which was enacted by General Eisenhower.

In October 1945, Herman was assigned to Spain to oversee the implementation of a law vesting the new German government with title to all German property located outside of Germany.

=== Nuremberg Trials ===
During the preparation for the Nuremberg Trials, Herman and the other members of the Legal Directorate were tasked with assisting in the selection of counsel for the German defendants. Herman personally attended the trials on December 10–11, 1945, and drafted the laws which were later used in the Subsequent Nuremberg Trials, conducted by U.S. officials in the American occupation zone.

Herman was a staunch defender of the trials' importance and legitimacy. In April 1946, at the urging of Eugene Meyer, Walter Lippmann, and Edward Weeks, he published an article in the Atlantic Monthly titled "Nuremberg: A Fair Trial?," defending the trials' contribution to the rule of law. He later defended this position against criticism from Senator Robert Taft with an editorial in the Washington Post.

=== Legal Advisor to the Department of State ===
Herman returned to the United States just before Christmas 1945. From 1946 to 1952, he resumed his practice with Brobeck, Phleger & Harrison.

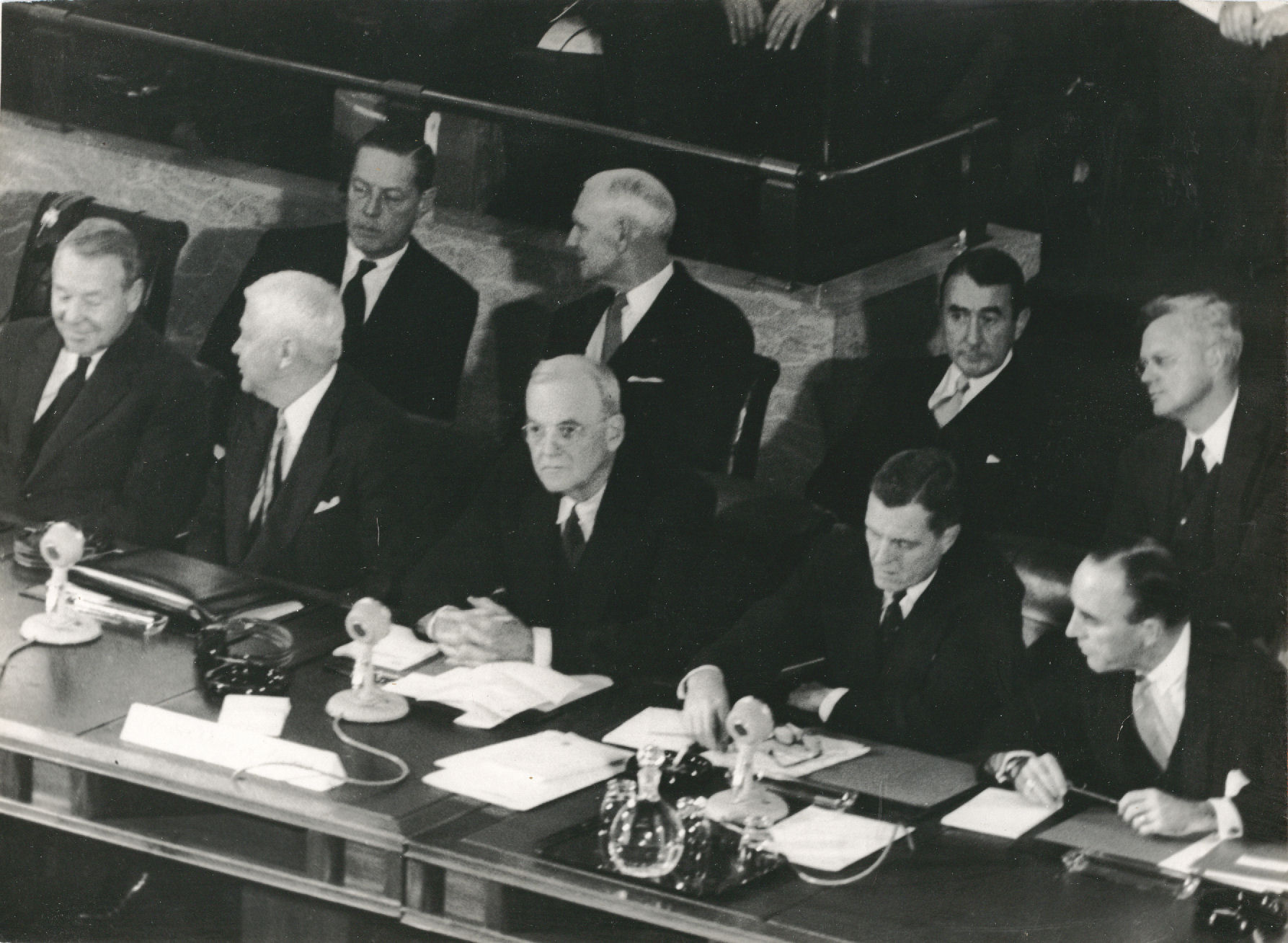
Herman Phleger (far left) at the 1955 Geneva "Big 4" Summit

In December 1952, he was asked to meet with Secretary of State John Foster Dulles in New York, where he was offered the position of Legal Advisor to the U.S. Department of State by the new President Dwight D. Eisenhower. Herman agreed on the condition that he "would have direct access to [Dulles] at all times and was not part of an organizational structure that would bring [him] under the supervision or direction of anyone else." Dulles approved.

Herman was a staunch supporter of Eisenhower's presidency, and attended his inauguration. He became Dulles' "closest and most valued colleague," allowing him to "exert an influence on matters well beyond the scope of his official position."

During his tenure as Legal Advisor, Herman participated in the handling of the Suez Crisis, the formulation of the Eisenhower Doctrine, the Bermuda Conference, the appointment of Chip Bohlen, the Bricker Amendment, the Status of Forces Treaty, the 1954 Pan-American Conference, the 1954 Geneva Conference, the Sino-American Mutual Defense Treaty, the Creation of the Southeast Asia Treaty Organization (SEATO), the 1955 Geneva Summit, and the defense of the State Department against accusations of Communist conspiracy during McCarthyism.

Herman resigned from the State Department on April 1, 1957, saying "I hadn't caught Potomac fever, and I had other things I should be working on."

=== Continuing Involvement in foreign affairs ===
Following his resignation from the State Department, Herman returned to his law practice in San Francisco. However, he continued to participate in foreign affairs.

From 1957 to 1963, President Eisenhower appointed Herman as a United States representative to the Permanent Court of Arbitration, the operative tribunal element created by the Hague Conventions. President Nixon appointed him to the same position from 1969 to 1975.

Throughout the 1950s, he regularly argued before the International Court of Justice.

In 1958, Eisenhower appointed him as a United States representative to the Thirteenth General Assembly of the United Nations.

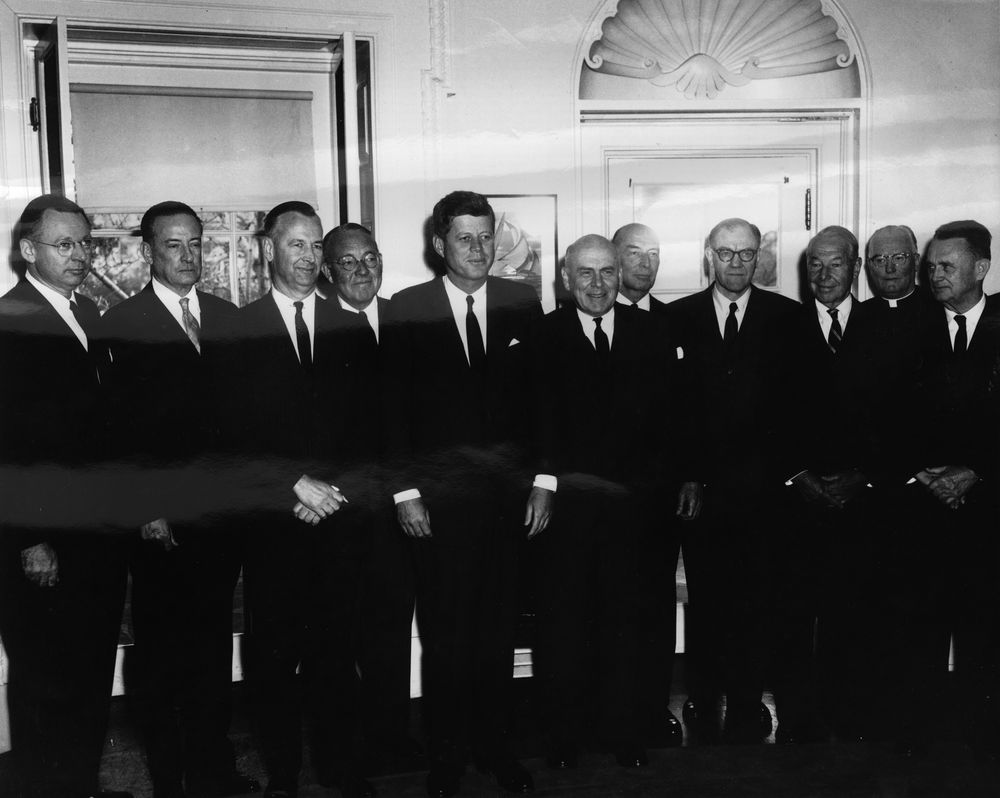
Herman Phleger (third from right) stands beside President John F. Kennedy during the swearing-in ceremony for the General Advisory Committee of the Arms Control and Disarmament Agency, April 2, 1962.

In 1959, Herman was asked by Secretary of State Christian Herter to represent the United States at the Antarctic Conference. Acting with the rank of ambassador, he was instrumental in the successful negotiations, and signed the resulting Antarctic Treaty on behalf of the United States.

In 1960, the American Ambassador to New Zealand, Francis H. Russell, asked Herman to address the Eleventh Dominion Legal Conference.

In 1962, he participated in the European-American Assembly on Outer Space.

Also in 1962, he was appointed by President John F. Kennedy to the Committee to Strengthen the Security of the Free World, later known as the Clay Committee, which was tasked with formulating a foreign aid program for the year 1963. During this time, Herman also made the acquaintance of future President Gerald Ford, then a Representative.

Again in 1962, President Kennedy appointed Herman to the Arms Control and Disarmament Agency, where he served until 1968.

In 1966 he was appointed by the president of the American Bar Association to the Commission on Electoral College Reform. Herman believed that the Electoral College system had "many defects," because it allowed "presidents [to be] elected by a minority of the people." He advocated that "electors should be chosen by dividing the electoral college vote of a state between the candidates in the same proportion as its popular vote." The resulting report recommended a constitutional amendment providing for the election of the President by popular vote.

== Personal life ==
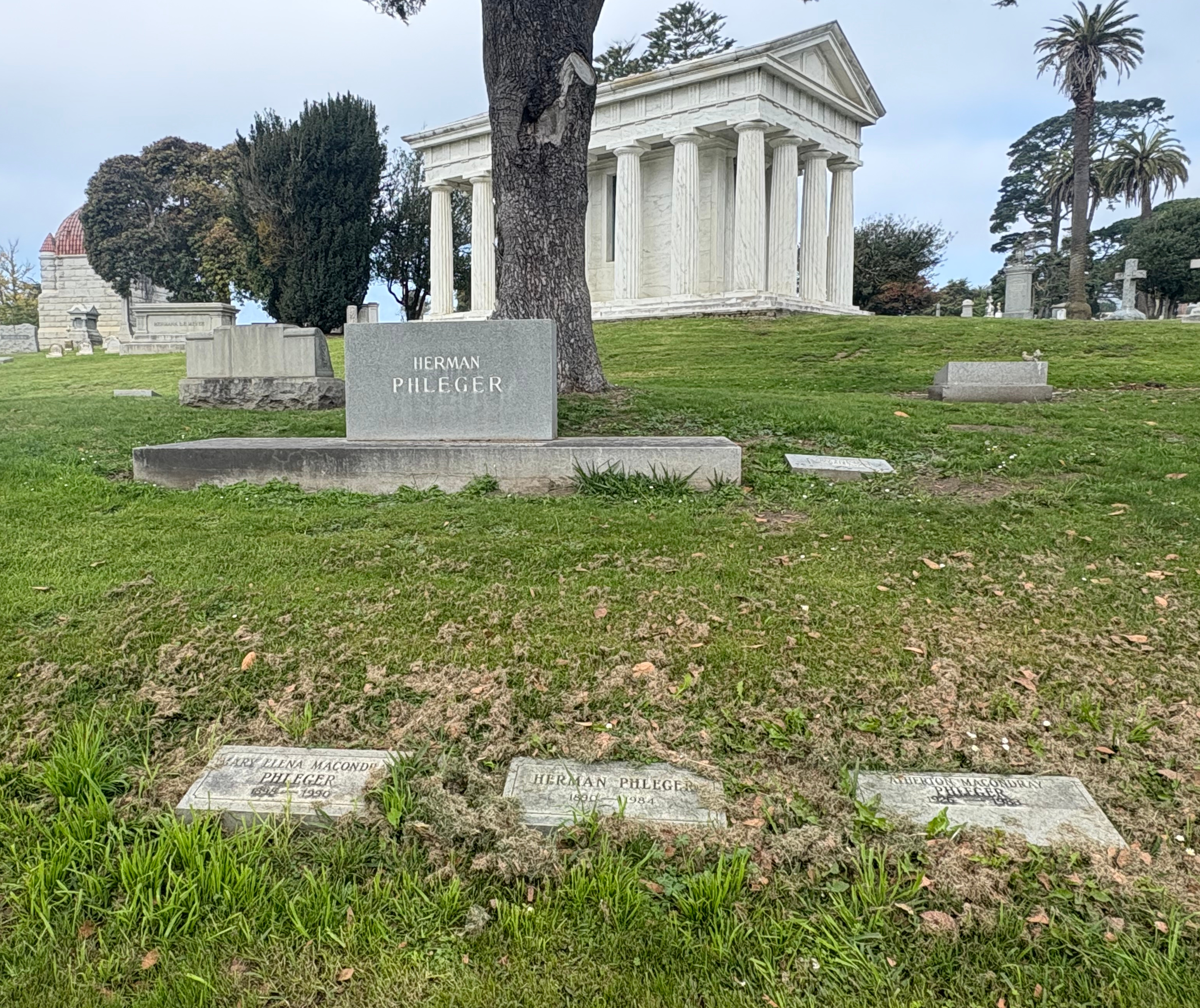
Phleger's grave at Cypress Lawn Memorial Park

Herman married Mary Elena Macondray on April 12, 1921. Mary Elena was the daughter of a prominent San Francisco family, and a relative of Gertrude Atherton.

In 1935, the couple purchased 1,084 acres in unincorporated San Mateo County, which they called Mountain Meadow. Following Herman's death in 1984, the property was sold to the Peninsula Open Space Trust, and was dedicated as part of the Golden Gate National Recreation Area on April 29, 1995. It is known as the Phleger Estate.

Herman served as a trustee for Mills College from 1927 to 1939, and a Stanford University trustee between 1944 and 1964, where he served alongside former President Herbert Hoover, with whom he became friends. Afterwards, he was elected as a trustee emeritus, a position only four other trustees had held up until that time. In 1972, Stanford established the Herman Phleger Visiting Professorship of Law. Herman also served as chairman of the Board of Trustees of the Children's Hospital of San Francisco from 1925 to 1950, and was a forty-year trustee of the William G. Irwin Foundation.

In 1938, Herman was made a director of Union Oil.

Throughout his life, Herman maintained friendships with Chief Justices Earl Warren and Warren Burger, and Justices Felix Frankfurter and Robert H. Jackson.

Herman served as a pallbearer for both John Foster Dulles and William Randolph Hearst.

He was a member of numerous clubs, including:

- Pacific-Union Club (where he served as president from 1952 to 1953);
- the Bohemian Club;
- the F Street Club;
- the Metropolitan Club;
- the Chevy Chase Club; and
- the Burning Tree Club.

Herman died on November 21, 1984, at his Mountain Meadow home. He was 94 years old. He was buried at Cypress Lawn Memorial Park in Colma.

=== Political views ===
Herman was a lifelong Republican. He was particularly opposed to increasing executive power, saying in 1977 "today we do have an imperial presidency. The power of the president is so much greater than the Constitution ever contemplated that sometimes I worry about what may take place in the future."

During World War II, Herman opposed the policy of Japanese internment.

Herman expressed reservations about the Vietnam War, calling its legal basis "very shaky." He later remarked that "few in government realized that the Vietnam War was a civil war and while the Communists were helping one of the sides, Communism was not the issue. The issue was the reunification of Vietnam and who would run the reunified country. That never seemed to penetrate their minds." Ultimately, he "believe[d] our military intervention in Vietnam was planned as a step in the establishment of a permanent American military presence in Southeast Asia."

During the Cold War, he supported normalization of relations with Russia, stating "If we could get a free flow of ideas, newspapers and people between our countries, it would be a big help in our quest for peace."
