= Joseph Goldstein (legal scholar) =

American legal academic

Joseph Goldstein (1923 – 12 March 2000) was an American legal scholar.

== Life ==
Goldstein was a Jew, and spoke Yiddish. A native of Springfield, Massachusetts, he earned a bachelor of arts degree from Dartmouth College in 1943. Goldstein served in the United States Army during the later years of World War II, then enrolled at Yale Law School. Goldstein left Yale after his first year of legal studies to pursue a doctorate from the London School of Economics, which was funded by a Fulbright Scholarship between 1949 and 1950. Goldstein obtained his bachelor's of law degree from Yale in 1952. As a student he served as an editor of the Yale Law Journal.

Prior to joining Yale Law as an associate professor in 1956, Goldstein had clerked for David L. Bazelon and taught at Stanford Law School and Harvard Law School. He was named a full professor at Yale in 1959, and subsequently held a succession of named professorships from 1968. That year, he was appointed Justus H. Hotchkiss Professor of Law. Goldstein became Walton Hale Hamilton Professor of Law, Science and Social Policy in 1969, Sterling Professor of Law in 1978, Sterling Professor Emeritus in 1993, and Derald H. Ruttenberg Professorial Lecturer in Law to 2000. As an instructor, he was known for favoring multiple sections of smaller classes, several of which he taught, instead of large lectures. In 1974, Goldstein stated, "I am a lawyer who happens to be an analyst." He coauthored books with Alan M. Dershowitz, Anna Freud, Loftus E. Becker, Jr., and Albert J. Solnit that reflected this focus, and specialized in child custody law. Goldstein suffered a heart attack at home in Woodbridge, Connecticut, and was sent to Yale New Haven Hospital, where he died on 12 March 2000.
