= Charles Eldridge Morgan Jr. =

American lawyer

Charles Eldridge Morgan Jr. (1844–1917) was a Civil War veteran who co-founded the law firm Morgan Lewis at Philadelphia in 1873 with fellow lawyer Francis Draper Lewis. He was twice vice-president of the Philadelphia Law Academy, and served the City of Philadelphia as its first Assistant City Solicitor, and as a member of its Boards of Education and City Trusts.

== Early life and family ==
Following his family's 1844 relocation from New Jersey to Pennsylvania, Morgan was born on September 23, 1844, in Philadelphia, the first child of Charles Eldridge Morgan and Jane Bowen Morgan (née Buck).

His brother, Randal (1853–1926), also graduated from the University of Pennsylvania, in 1873, and joined Morgan's newly opened law firm, then became, in 1882, the first vice-president of its principle client firm, United Gas Improvement Company (later UGI Corporation).

Another brother, John Buck (1847–1919), graduated from the University of Pennsylvania, as well, receiving degrees in 1866 and 1869, and played on the cricket team captained by Morgan; he became a successful manufacturer, merchant and financier who served on the Boards of several Philadelphia institutions.

Morgan married Elizabeth Belsham "Lillie" Merrick, daughter of Thomas B. Merrick and Elizabeth M. White, on April 27, 1875, at Philadelphia, with whom he had three children: Charles Eldridge Morgan III, who joined him at his firm in the practice of law; Elizabeth Merrick Morgan Perry; and Hallowell Vaughn Morgan.

== Education ==
Morgan attended Germantown schools, then the University of Pennsylvania, where he was graduated in 1864.

== The Landis Battery ==
Morgan's studies were interrupted by the American Civil War, when he organized Landis' Battery in response to General Robert E. Lee's raid through Pennsylvania. Stationed at Carlisle during June through August 1863, as first-line reserves for the Battle of Gettysburg; contrary to some reports, the Battery did not see action at that historic engagement.

== Cricket ==
Morgan was captain of the University of Pennsylvania's 1864 cricket team, on which his brother, John Buck Morgan (1847 - 1919), also played; the team was distinguished by playing the first intercollegiate cricket match in the college's history, against Haverford College, on May 7, 1864. He later co-founded the Germantown Cricket Club.

== Career ==
Following his Civil War service; Morgan read law in the office of Judge William A. Porter, then was admitted to the bar in 1868. Five years later, he co-founded Morgan & Lewis with Francis Draper Lewis, on March 10, 1873, and remained an active practitioner throughout his career. In 1878, City Solicitor William Nelson West (co-founder of the banking firm Henry & West with W. Barklie Henry) appointed Morgan Philadelphia's first Assistant City Solicitor, an office he retained until 1884.

He served as vice-president of the Philadelphia Law Academy in 1869, and 1878 to 1885, and on the Board of Education for five years, followed by the Board of City Trusts for Philadelphia.
