= William Ephraim Mikell =

American lawyer

William Ephraim Mikell (January 29, 1868 – January 19, 1944) was an American legal scholar, lawyer and dean of the University of Pennsylvania Law School.

== Biography ==
Mikell was born in Sumter, South Carolina, to Thomas Price and Rebecca (Moses) Mikell. He married Martha Turner McBee in 1894. He lived in Philadelphia and maintained a winter home in Charleston, South Carolina, and was buried in the city.

He graduated from South Carolina Military College (the Citadel) with a BS in 1890, and from the University of Virginia Law School in 1894. Mikell was admitted to the South Carolina Bar in 1894.

Mikell was Dean of the University of Pennsylvania Law School from 1915 to 1929. He had joined the law school faculty in 1897, and taught at the law school for 46 years.

He wrote a number of books on the law, primarily on criminal law. The University of Pennsylvania has an archive with a collection of his papers.

Preceded by William Draper Lewis	Dean of the University of Pennsylvania Law School; 1914–1929	Succeeded by Herbert Funk Goodrich
