= William Draper Lewis =

American academic and administrator

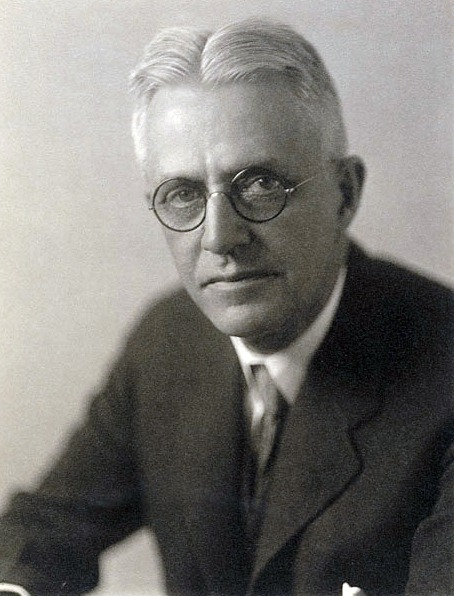
- Lewis circa 1930-1940
- Born: Philadelphia, Pennsylvania, U.S.
- Title: Dean

Academic background
- Education: Haverford College (B.S. 1888); University of Pennsylvania (LL.B. 1892); University of Pennsylvania (Ph.D. in Economics, 1892)

Academic work
- Institutions: University of Pennsylvania Law School

William Draper Lewis (1867–1949) was the first full-time dean of the University of Pennsylvania Law School (1896–1914), and the founding director (1923–1947) of the American Law Institute.

== Personal life and education ==
William Draper Lewis was reported by the Pennsylvania Law Review as being a devout Episcopalian born to Quaker parents, Henry and Fannie Hannah Wilson Lewis, in Philadelphia, in 1867. Lewis was the great-grandson of Simeon Draper, and a descendant of James Draper, an early settler of the Massachusetts Bay Colony. He also descended from Puritan pioneer George Lewes (1600–1663), an early settler at Plymouth Colony; the clothier-turned-farmer was also, in 1648 and 1650, an early surveyor of highways and, in 1651, was appointed constable of the town of Barnstable.

Lewis attended Germantown Academy, graduating in 1885, earned a B.S. from Haverford College in 1888, then, in 1892, received an LLB. and PhD in Economics from the University of Pennsylvania.

He was the first cousin of Francis Draper Lewis, co-founder of Morgan, Lewis & Bockius. In 1892, Lewis married Caroline Mary Cope, with whom he had four children, Henry, Alfreda Cope, Anna, and William Draper Jr.

== University of Pennsylvania Law School ==
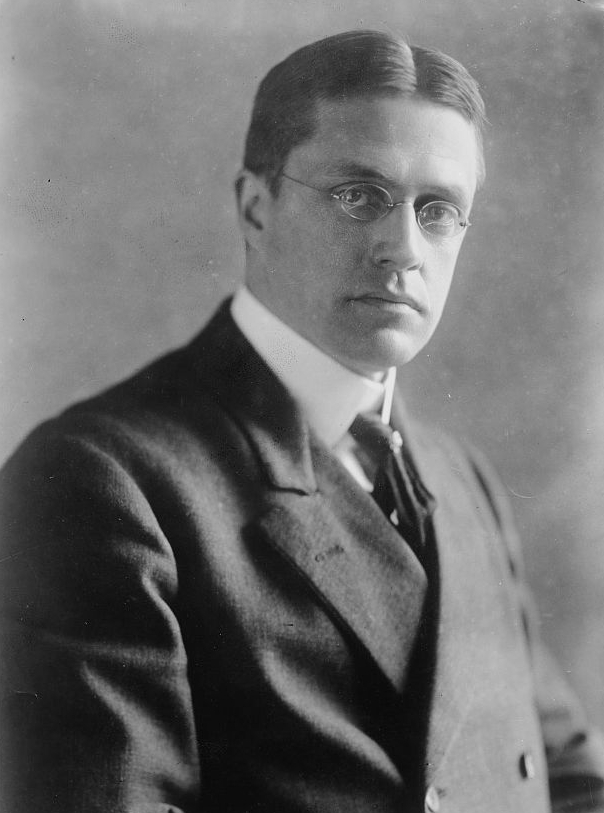
Lewis circa 1915

In 1896, Lewis, though only 29, was the perfect candidate for the first full-time dean of the university's Law School. His law practice had all but disappeared under what was to become a lifelong obsession: the cataloging of American law. Only four years out of law school, he had committed himself to an overwhelming smorgasbord of editorial projects, the major ones in conjunction with friend, business associate and later U.S. Senator George Wharton Pepper. Notably, the two men served as editors of the University of Pennsylvania Law Review, published at the time under the name American Law Register and Review.

Lewis saw a national role for the Law School, one that would fill the role of the fading apprenticeship system for young lawyers. Development of a core of full-time faculty sat at the top of Lewis's agenda, but he gave equal attention to curriculum, admissions and graduation standards, and facilities – in particular the library. A pragmatist and a humanist, he established the tradition at Penn Law of the dean as first among equals.

Lewis is said to have treated his colleagues and friends with good humor and tolerance, and was continually concerned with student welfare; a large part of each faculty meeting was given over to the discussion of student "petitions" for relief of one kind or another.

He cared about, stewed over, and poked into every conceivable aspect of the school. He arranged stays for sick students at sanitariums. He even toured the guts of his grand new building (opened in 1900) to understand and correct malfunctions of the heating and ventilation system.

A compulsive communicator, Lewis dictated letters a dozen at a time and served as recording secretary for faculty meetings. His mailings to prospective students and their parents could run to three or four typed pages, intermixing his philosophy of education with practical concerns directed to the inquirer's situation.

Well-loved by students, Lewis was universally referred to as "Uncle Billy" and considered somewhat eccentric; at a 1934 dinner in Lewis' honor, Pepper toasted "one of the most lovable and whimsical personalities which any of us have met in a lifetime. ... [W]e reserve the right to rejoice in his split infinitives, his mixed metaphors and the strange beings with which his imagination peopled the cases discussed in his classroom."

Lewis could be quite deliberately funny, which could invite criticism. To the secretary of the university, he wrote, in 1900: "I have received your formal apology for your very grave mistake concerning the University Council. What it was all about I have not the slightest idea, but evidently if anything was wrong, the letter before me makes everything right."

He was also a manager of the 1907-founded Comparative Law Bureau of the American Bar Association, whose Annual Bulletin was the first comparative law journal in the U.S.

== Political career ==
During the later years of his deanship, Lewis's attention was highly diverted by the politics of the Progressive Republican movement. Advisor and confidant to Theodore Roosevelt; Lewis chaired the platform committee for Roosevelt's failed run for president on the Bull Moose Party ticket in 1912. In his most politically impassioned (or naïve) maneuver, Lewis ran for Pennsylvania governor in 1914 on a straight Progressive platform, a dalliance which forced his resignation from the deanship but took him no closer to the governor's mansion. He remained on the Law School faculty until 1924.

== American Law Institute ==
At the 1920 and 1921 meetings of the Association of American Law Schools, Lewis urged the creation of an "institute of law" to elucidate the progress of the common law. In 1923, the American Law Institute became a reality. "Founding father" Lewis became its first director, shaping its agenda of preparing "restatements" of the "law, as it had developed under the divergent decisions of the American courts," being, according to Judge Augustus N. Hand, "largely his own conception and it is no exaggeration to say that it was principally his faith and zeal that finally resulted in enlisting Senator Elihu Root, George W. Wickersham, James Byrne[s] and many other distinguished lawyers, as well as numerous judges and teachers of the law, in the enterprise and in obtaining the financial support for it of the Carnegie Corporation," presidential advisor Root, a Nobel Peace Laureate, was also a close advisor to Andrew Carnegie. Lewis served the institute until June 1947, two years before his death.

Though the ALI's restatements met with complaints that they undermined the fluidity of the common law and echoed the codification of European civil law, it is fair to say Lewis's work as director rank him as the single most influential figure in the pragmatic development of 20th-Century American Law.

== Author ==
Lewis was a writer and editor, epitomized by his having edited all eight Volumes of Great American Lawyers.

During the year following Roosevelt's death; Dr. Lewis authored The Life of Theodore Roosevelt, a biography reviewed in 1920 as "notable for its calm judicious survey of Roosevelt's public life and, particularly, of the rise, growth, and decline of the Progressive party. A remarkably sympathetic introduction is supplied by ex-President Taft."

== Death ==
He died on September 2, 1949.

Preceded by G.S. Harrison; Interim Sub-Dean	Dean of the University of Pennsylvania Law School; 1896–1914	Succeeded by William Ephraim Mikell

Preceded by (none)	Director of the American Law Institute; 1923–1947	Succeeded by Herbert Funk Goodrich
