= Loftus Becker =

American legal scholar

6th Legal Adviser of the Department of State
- In office June 13, 1957 – August 15, 1959
- Preceded by: Herman Phleger
- Succeeded by: Eric H. Hager

Personal details
- Education: Harvard University; University of Pennsylvania

Loftus Eugene Becker Jr. is a professor of law emeritus at the University of Connecticut School of Law, where he teaches criminal law, constitutional law, and a seminar on the Supreme Court. In 1965, he graduated from Harvard College, and in 1969 from the University of Pennsylvania School of Law, where he served as editor-in-chief of the University of Pennsylvania Law Review. After graduating from law school, he was a law clerk for Chief Judge David L. Bazelon of the U.S. Court of Appeals for the District of Columbia Circuit, and Justice William J. Brennan, Jr., of the Supreme Court of the United States. He taught at the University of Minnesota Law School from. 1971 to 1977.

== Selected publications ==
- Durham Revisited: Psychiatry and the Problem of Crime (1973)
- Criminal Law: Theory and Process (with Joseph Goldstein) (Supp. 1982)
- Plea Bargaining and the Supreme Court, 21 Loyola of L.A. L. Rev 757 (1988)
- The Liability of Computer Bulletin Board Operators for Defamation Posted By Others, 22 Conn. L. Rev. 203 (1989)

== See also ==
- List of law clerks for the third seat of the Supreme Court of the United States
