= Henry J. Friendly Medal =

American legal award

The Henry J. Friendly Medal is an award given periodically by the American Law Institute (ALI) in recognition of outstanding contributions to the field of law. It is named in honor of Judge Henry Friendly of the United States Court of Appeals for the Second Circuit. The medal is conferred to an individual for their contributions "in the tradition of Judge Friendly."

The award is reserved to some of the most influential modern jurists in the U.S., including Judge Merrick Garland, and U.S. Supreme Court Justices Anthony Kennedy, Ruth Bader Ginsburg, and John Roberts. It is the most prestigious award given by the ALI.

== Background ==
The Friendly Medal was established by Judge Friendly's former law clerks after his death. Friendly had been a member of the American Law Institute's council. The medal initially featured a likeness of Friendly smiling, but was changed as the judge rarely smiled. It is given by the American Law Institute Awards Committee.

== Prize ==
The medal is only awarded as appropriate and not on an annual basis. The award has been described as "prestigious" and "reserved for recipients who are considered especially worthy of receiving it." It is one of the highest honors given by the ALI, and is not limited to the organization's members. In 1992, Judge Michael Boudin of the United States Court of Appeals for the First Circuit was the chair of the awarding committee. After it was established, Edward Weinfeld, a close friend of Judge Friendly, traveled in person to be the first to receive the award before dying a day later.

== Recipients ==
Year	Image	Recipient	Title	Ref
1988		Edward Weinfeld (1901–1988)	Judge of the United States District Court for the Southern District of New York	
1989		Paul A. Freund (1908–1992)	Carl M. Loeb University Professor at Harvard Law School	
1993		Herbert Wechsler (1909–2000)	Harlan Fiske Stone Professor of Constitutional Law at Columbia Law School	
2000		William Thaddeus Coleman Jr. (1920–2017)	Judge of the United States Court of Military Commission Review	
2002		Anthony Lewis (1927–2013)	James Madison Chair at Columbia University	
2002		Linda Greenhouse (1947–)	Joseph M. Goldstein Lecturer in Law at Yale Law School	
2005		Ronald Dworkin (1931–2013)	Frank Henry Sommer Professor of Law and Philosophy at New York University	
2005		Richard Posner (1939–2026)	Chief Judge of the United States Court of Appeals for the Seventh Circuit	
2009		Nicholas Katzenbach (1922–2012)	24th United States Under Secretary of State; 65th United States Attorney General	
2011		Sandra Day O'Connor (1930–2023)	Associate Justice of the Supreme Court of the United States	
2013		William H. Webster (1924–2025)	14th Director of Central Intelligence; 3rd Director of the Federal Bureau of Investigation; Judge of the United States Court of Appeals for the Eighth Circuit	
2014		Michael Boudin (1939–2025)	Senior Judge of the United States Court of Appeals for the First Circuit	
2014		Pierre Leval (1936–)	Senior Judge of the United States Court of Appeals for the Second Circuit	
2016		Patricia Wald (1928–2019)	Chief Judge of the United States Court of Appeals for the District of Columbia Circuit; Justice of the International Criminal Tribunal for the Former Yugoslavia	
2017		Conrad K. Harper (1940–)	President of the New York City Bar Association	
2018		Ruth Bader Ginsburg (1933–2020)	Associate Justice of the Supreme Court of the United States	
2019		Anthony Kennedy (1936–)	Associate Justice of the Supreme Court of the United States	
2022		Merrick Garland (1952–)	86th United States Attorney General; Chief Judge of the United States Court of Appeals for the District of Columbia Circuit	
2023		John Roberts (1955–)	17th Chief Justice of the United States	
2026		Diane Wood (1950–)	Judge of the United States Court of Appeals for the Seventh Circuit	
