= Immigration Equality (organization) =

United States nonprofit organization

- Logo of Immigration Equality since 2020
- Abbreviation: ImEq
- Formation: March 3, 1994; 32 years ago
- Type: NGO (non-governmental agency)
- Legal status: Non-profit advocacy
- Purpose: Advocating for equal immigration and asylum rights for lesbian, gay, bisexual, transgender, (LGBT) and HIV-positive people
- Headquarters: New York City
- Executive Director: Aaron C. Morris
- Staff: 18
- Website: www.ImmigrationEquality.org

Logo between 2005 and 2020

Immigration Equality is a United States nonprofit organization founded in 1994. Based in New York, it both advocates for and directly represents LGBTQ and HIV-positive people in the immigration system.

The organization provides guidance and legal counsel for LGBTQ and HIV-positive immigrants, particularly those seeking asylum from countries where they face persecution. In 2017, it provided over $33 million in free legal services for low-income LGBTQ and HIV-positive immigrants. It wins 99% of its cases.

== Direct legal representation and clients ==
Immigration Equality represents LGBTQ and HIV-positive immigrants seeking safety, fair treatment, and freedom in the United States. Its clients include asylum seekers, binational couples and families, detained individuals, and undocumented people.

In over 80 countries worldwide, it is a crime to be LGBT. Due to their sexual orientation, gender identity, or HIV status, clients are persecuted in their country of origin and flee to the United States. The fear of further abuse, torture, and death prevents their return. Without legal immigration status in the United States, they can be detained by immigration officials and deported. Immigration Equality helps clients to win asylum or release from detention so they can live safely and freely in the United States.

Clients detained in detention centers have reported abuse by fellow detainees and guards. They often report spending a majority of their time isolated in solitary confinement, particularly transgender woman who are housed in male facilities.

Historically, Immigration Equality's largest source of clients has come from Jamaica, with Mexico trailing right behind. In 2013, with Russia's "anti-gay propaganda" law, the organization's number of Russian clients surpassed the number of Mexican clients.

Over the last 20 years, the largest percentage of Immigration Equality clients has come from the Caribbean and Latin America. As more countries worldwide pass anti-LGBTQ laws, the number of individuals coming to Immigration Equality from Russia, the Middle East, and Sub-Saharan Africa has increased.

Immigration Equality has a 98% win rate for their clients in asylum offices and immigration court. In 2013, the organization represented approximately 354 clients. Immigration Equality maintains a list of LGBTQ and HIV-competent private immigration attorneys to provide legal representation for those who contact them. They also provide technical assistance to attorneys who are working on sexual orientation, transgender identity, or HIV status-based right of asylum applications, or other immigration applications where the client's LGBTQ or HIV-positive identity is at issue in the case.

== Advocacy efforts ==
Immigration Equality advocates for client-driven policy priorities such as creating comprehensive immigration reform, implementing LGBTQ-inclusive legislation and policy, and asking for accountability from decision-makers in Washington, D.C.

According to Immigration Equality, the following policy changes are still needed to advance the LGBTQ immigrant community: stop deporting LGBTQ immigrants, repeal the arbitrary one-year filing deadline for asylum, include LGBTQ people in administrative relief and immigration reform, improve conditions in immigration detention, increase the use of alternatives to detention, decrease asylum backlogs by hiring the appropriate number of officials, recognize 'families' to include those without access to marriage equality, and utilize group-based protection mechanisms for LGBTQ people trapped abroad.

In September 2014, Immigration Equality rallied before the White House to call for immediate action after President Obama announced a delay on his executive action on immigration. Members of the organization traveled to D.C. with clients to tell their stories and protest in the offices of House representatives, including John Boehner (R-Ohio), House Judiciary Committee Chair Bob Goodlatte (R-Va.) and Rep. Jason Chaffetz (R-Utah), but they refused to meet with the activists.

== History ==
The organization was founded in 1994 by Suzanne Goldberg, Noemi Masliah, and Lavi Soloway as the Lesbian and Gay Immigration Rights Task Force.

In 2004, the organization officially changed their name to Immigration Equality.

In May 2006, in conjunction with the Human Rights Watch, Immigration Equality released their report, "Family, Unvalued: Discrimination, Denial, and the Fate of Binational Same-Sex Couples under United States Law", which was based on research conducted from 2003–2006 to "emphasize and spotlight the plight of same-sex binational couples". The report documented the cases of couples who hid the fact they were in a same-sex relationship when reporting to the 2000 U.S. Census because they feared anti-LGBTQ bias in the immigration process, as well as cases of couples who failed to participate in the census because their foreign partners were living in the United States illegally. The report also cited couples who were affected by U.S. immigration policies that overlook same-sex bi-national couples completely and outlined facts about the U.S.'s current visa and immigration system explaining how LGBTQ people either fit into the system or do not.

Immigration Equality campaigned to lift the ban on travel and immigration into the U.S. on the part of those with HIV, which had been enacted in 1987 and strengthened in 1993. In July 2008, President George Bush signed legislation to permit the lifting of the ban. President Obama announced in October 2009 that the Department Health and Human Services was publishing rules that would end the 22-year ban by removing HIV from list of "communicable disease[s] of public health significance" that the Immigration Service relied on. The ban was lifted in January 2010.

In 2008, Immigration Equality opened their Washington, D.C. office, shortly after Congress repealed the HIV immigration and travel ban, fulfilling one of the organization's founding objectives. During the same year, Immigration Equality, in conjunction with the Transgender Law Center, drafted Immigration Law and the Transgender Client, a manual published by the American Immigration Lawyers Association, the first LGBTQ publication that the latter organization has issued.[18] Immigration Equality also won over fifty political asylum cases where the potential deportees feared persecution if returned to their homeland.

In 2009, the group created the Immigration Equality Action Fund, a 501(c)(4) organization devoted to federal lobbying.

In 2015, Immigration Equality provided more than 32,704 hours of free legal service by their legal team and partners. In October 2016, Immigration Equality welcomed their new executive director Aaron C. Morris.

In May 2015, Immigration Equality's website was selected for inclusion in the Library of Congress' historic collection of Internet materials related to public policy topics.

== Uniting American Families Act ==
Immigration Equality has been the principal advocate for the Uniting American Families Act (UAFA, H.R. 1024, S. 424). They have worked to introduce the legislation, educated Congress members about the need for passage and documented Americans and their families affected by the issue. Immigration Equality has been lobbying for the act since 2000 which would allow "same-sex 'permanent partners' to present documents – joint tax filings, property records, bank accounts – to prove their relationship and petition for a green card" the same as heterosexual couples are able to do. The group placed a warning notice regarding same-sex marriage on the group's website as getting married might actually be more problematic for bi-national same-sex couples. John Nechman, co-chair of Immigration Equality explained "|[M]any of the problems related to legal civil-unions have to do with "intent" under the law. "If they go and marry, when that person goes to apply for an adjustment of status or a new F1 visa, there is going to be a question as to whether he is married. And if he puts down no, he has just committed fraud. If he puts down yes, they're going to want to know info about the spouse; and if he's applying for a new F1, that means temporary intent. By putting down a U.S. spouse, that means that you're intending to stay." In July 2007 executive director Rachel B. Tiven was interviewed on Fox News' political talkshow The O'Reilly Factor about the legislation.

There are currently 115 cosponsors of this legislation in the House of Representatives and 20 cosponsors in the Senate.

Represented by Immigration Equality, Lambda Legal and law firm Morgan Lewis & Bockius, in October 2020, the United States Department of State withdrew its appeal of the verdict in Kiviti v. Pompeo, and declined to appeal Mize-Gregg v. Pompeo. Federal district courts ruled the State Department’s refusal to recognize children born oversees to married same-sex, American citizen couples as U.S. citizens to be unlawful in both cases.

== See also ==
- President's Emergency Plan for AIDS Relief
