= Brobeck, Phleger & Harrison =

American defunct law firm

- Headquarters: San Francisco, California, US
- No. of attorneys: 520 (Jan. 2003)
- No. of employees: 1,100 (2003)
- Major practice areas: General practice
- Date founded: 1926
- Company type: Limited liability partnership
- Dissolved: 2003 (bankruptcy)

Brobeck, Phleger & Harrison LLP was a prominent American law firm headquartered in San Francisco, California. Founded in 1926, the firm was known for its early work with technology startups in Silicon Valley during the 1990s dot-com boom. At its peak, Brobeck had over 1,100 attorneys and staff across 14 offices and represented major clients such as Cisco Systems, Sun Microsystems, and Nike.

In 2003, the firm was liquidated under Chapter 7 of the U.S. Bankruptcy Code, after it had lost a substantial amount of money in the dot-com bubble and merger talks with Morgan, Lewis & Bockius had fallen through.

== History ==
Brobeck, Phleger & Harrison was formed in 1926 when three lawyers split from Morrison & Foerster (then called Morrison, Dunne & Brobeck). Between the two World Wars, the firm cultivated an A-list of bluechip San Francisco clients, including Wells Fargo, and managing partner Herman Phleger served as an advisor to Bernard Baruch during the creation of the United Nations. In 1980, the firm established an office in Palo Alto to serve expanding technology companies in Santa Clara County. By the mid-1990s, Brobeck had become one of the two largest firms representing technology startups in Silicon Valley, with marquee clients such as Cisco Systems, Sun Microsystems, Nokia and Nike.

In the 1990s, as the technology boom began to roar, Brobeck attorneys began accepting company shares from emerging companies in lieu of traditional law firm compensation. The firm re-oriented itself to service many emerging tech companies who were going public via initial public offerings (IPOs) and then engaging in extensive merger and market consolidation (mergers & acquisitions).

Brobeck's revenue jumped from $214 million in 1998 to $314 million in 2000. By the summer of 2000, the firm counted eight offices nationwide and 754 attorneys, up 40 percent from the year before. Brobeck's profits-per-partner soared to more than $1 million a year. Just three years later, it had reached 1,100 lawyers and support staff in 14 cities, and offered a starting first-year associate salary of $135,000 per year.

When the dot-com bubble burst in 2001 onward, the firm's strategy of betting on technology clients to compensate the firm's lawyers imploded as the lawyers' equity shares became worthless, work dried up and partners with traditional clients or portable business darted to other firms. Chairman Tower Snow was ousted in 2002, and decamped with some 50 Brobeck attorneys to begin the West Coast offices of London-based giant Clifford Chance Rogers & Wells, now called Clifford Chance.

Brobeck engaged in talks to merge with the Philadelphia-based law firm Morgan Lewis & Bockius, but after four months, merger talks broke off on January 29, 2003. Overwhelmed by partner defections, bank debt, and loads of empty office space, Brobeck announced that it was disbanding two days later. The firm became subject to Chapter 7 bankruptcy proceedings through a petition filed by some of its creditors in September 2003.

After its dissolution, Morgan Lewis & Bockius inducted nearly 60 of Brobeck's attorneys into its partnership.

Brobeck's bankruptcy trustee later filed suit against both the Morgan Lewis and Clifford Chance firms for undisclosed reasons, and reached sizable settlements from both firms in 2004.
