= Sheri Dillon =

American attorney

Sheri Dillon is an American attorney who is a member of the law firm Morgan, Lewis & Bockius LLP since 2015.

== Education ==
- Georgetown University Law Center, 1999, J.D., cum laude
- University of Missouri, 1986, M.P.P., with honors
- University of Missouri, 1984, B.A.

== Career ==
Dillon is one of the tax attorneys for former President Donald Trump. She was "primarily responsible" for two conservation easement donations, which created $21.1 million in tax deductions for the Trump Organization.

Law firm Morgan, Lewis & Bockius is withdrawing from representing former President Donald Trump and his businesses as clients because of a New York State probe over alleged tax fraud. The allegations are that the Trump Organization falsely inflated its assets to get loans and obtain tax benefits. Judge Arthur F. Engoron ordered law firm Morgan, Lewis & Bockius LLP to give New York Attorney General Letitia James documents concerning the alleged tax fraud.
