= SEARCH, The National Consortium for Justice Information and Statistics =

American nonprofit organization

SEARCH Logo

SEARCH, The National Consortium for Justice Information and Statistics (also called SEARCH), is a nonprofit criminal justice support organization created by and for the states. Its headquarters are in Sacramento, California.

SEARCH was established in 1969. It provides support to the information sharing, interoperability, information technology, cybercrime and criminal records needs of justice and public safety agencies and practitioners nationwide at the state, local and tribal levels.

== Mission ==
SEARCH has a mission to improve "the quality of justice and public safety through the use, management, and exchange of information; application of new technologies; and responsible law and policy, while safeguarding security and privacy."

== House Resolution ==
On November 17, 2009, the U.S. House of Representatives passed House Resolution 851 to recognize the organization's 40th anniversary. The resolution was sponsored by Congresswoman Doris O. Matsui (D-CA 5).

== Programs ==
SEARCH programs offer assistance to justice and public safety agencies to develop, operate, secure, and improve information sharing and identification systems. Its programs focus on: information sharing initiatives, criminal history records systems, information technology planning, acquisition, and management, cybercrime investigation and systems security, information law and policy, public safety and communications interoperability.

== Membership ==
SEARCH is governed by a Membership Group composed of one gubernatorial appointee from the 50 states, the District of Columbia, Puerto Rico, and the U.S. Virgin Islands, and eight at-large appointees selected by the SEARCH Chair. Members are responsible for operational decisions and policymaking concerning the management of criminal justice and criminal history information. The current Chairman of SEARCH is Mr. Brad Truitt, Director of Information Systems, Tennessee Bureau of Investigation.

== Partnerships ==
SEARCH partners with other agencies, organizations and associations to support IT initiatives and information sharing, such as rap sheet standards, Global Justice Information Sharing Initiative, National Information Exchange Model (NIEM), and the FBI's National Data Exchange Project (N-DEx).
