= Union House Hotel =

- U.S. National Register of Historic Places
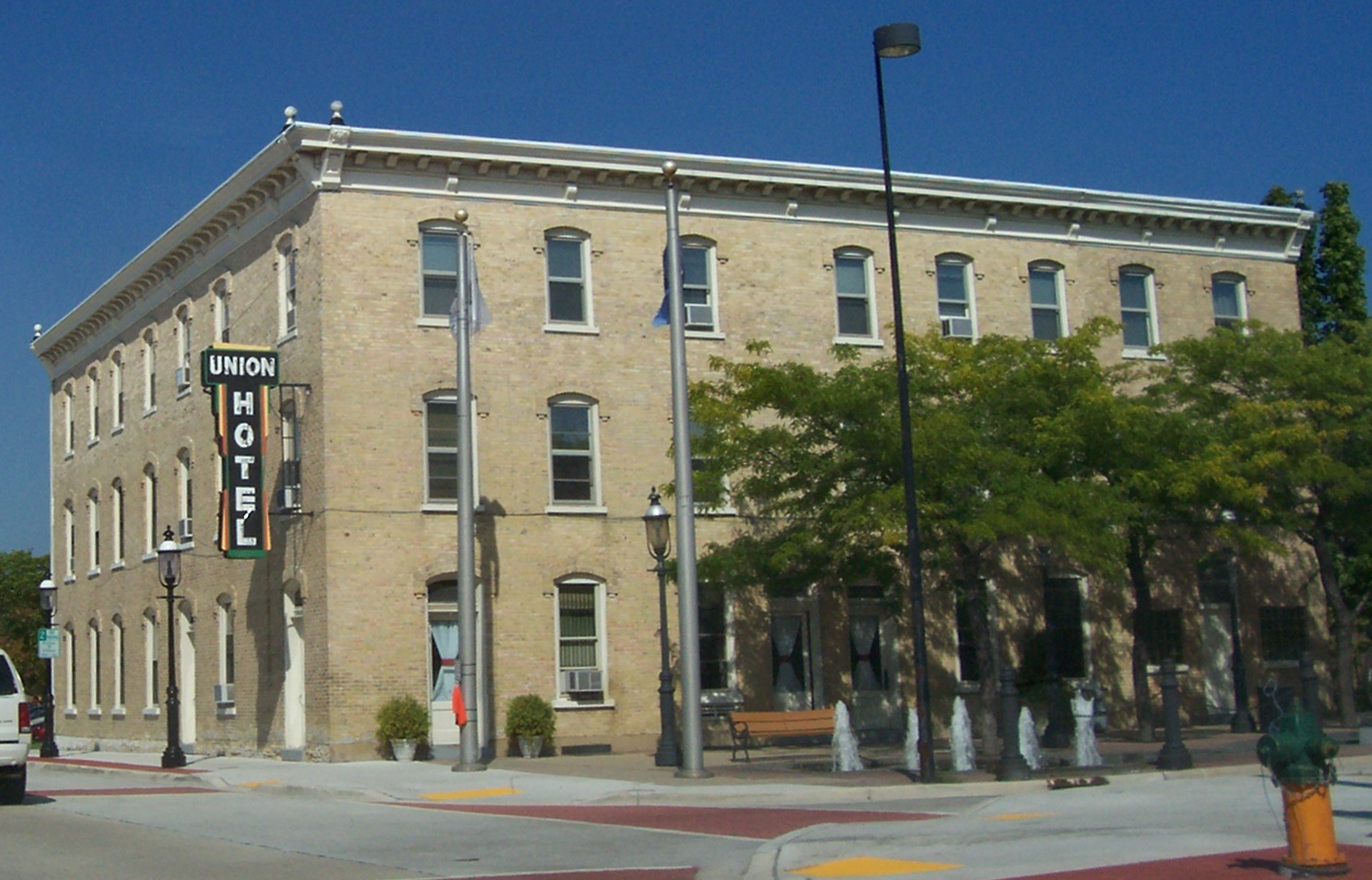
- Location: 200 North Broadway; De Pere, Wisconsin
- Coordinates: 44.45025°N 88.06017°W
- Built: 1883
- Architectural style: Victorian
- NRHP reference No.: 03001216
- Added to NRHP: November 26, 2003

Union House Hotel is located in De Pere, Wisconsin. It was added to the National Register of Historic Places in 2003.

== History ==
The hotel was originally run by brothers Nicholas and Fred Altmayer. In 1918, August Maternoski purchased the building. Additions have been made to the hotel in 1885, 1903, 1918 and 1922. It the oldest continuously operated hotel in the area.
