= Morgan, Lewis & Bockius =

International law firm

Morgan, Lewis & Bockius LLP
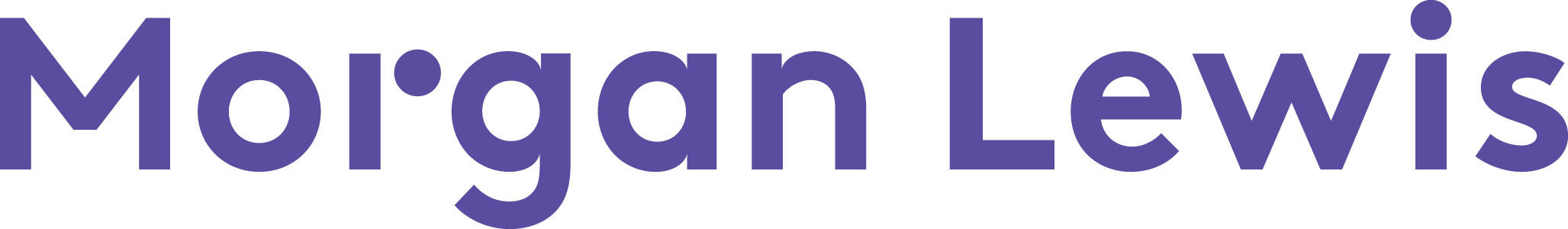
- Headquarters: 2222 Market Street; Philadelphia, Pennsylvania, United States
- No. of offices: 33
- No. of attorneys: ~2,000
- Major practice areas: Aviation, aerospace and defense, banking, corporate law, labor and employment, litigation, regulatory, intellectual property, energy and environmental, fintech, healthcare and life sciences, retail and e-commerce, sports, technology
- Key people: David A. McManus, Chair
- Revenue: ▲US$3.01 billion (2024)
- Date founded: March 10, 1873; 153 years ago
- Founders: Charles Eldridge Morgan Jr.; Francis Draper Lewis
- Company type: Limited liability partnership
- Website: morganlewis.com

Morgan, Lewis & Bockius LLP (known as Morgan Lewis) is a U.S.-based, white-shoe international law firm founded in Philadelphia, in 1873. It operates 33 offices in North America, Europe, Asia, and the Middle East. The firm advises clients in numerous industry sectors, including energy, financial services, technology, and life sciences, representing close to 90 percent of Fortune 100 companies.

== History ==
=== 19th century ===
Morgan Lewis was founded in Philadelphia on March 10, 1873, by Civil War veteran Charles Eldridge Morgan Jr., who later served as the Philadelphia Law Academy's vice president, and Francis Draper Lewis, son of a wholesale dry goods merchant, and a first cousin of William Draper Lewis, the dean of the University of Pennsylvania Law School.

In 1883, Morgan & Lewis hired Morris Rex Bockius, who had graduated in June of that year with Master of Arts and Bachelor of Law degrees from the University of Pennsylvania Law School. He became a partner 15 years after joining the firm, which he then led until his death, in 1939. The firm became Morgan, Lewis & Bockius in 1908, though it is still commonly referred to by its sobriquet, "Morgan Lewis."

The firm began representing the United Gas Improvement Company, later UGI, in 1882; it became the largest gas and electric utility company in the United States and remained a client of the firm well over a century later. From the early 20th century, Morgan, Lewis & Bockius clients have included Philadelphia's largest daily newspaper, The Philadelphia Bulletin; Pennsylvania's largest railroad, Baldwin Locomotive Works; Scott Paper; and several major banks and trust companies.

=== 20th century ===
The firm has adhered to the Cravath System, a standardized compensation model used by many elite American BigLaw firms throughout the 20th century. Under this system, associate salaries and bonuses increase predictably with seniority and are typically aligned with industry benchmarks.

In 1963, Morgan Lewis hired its first female law associate, Gail McKnight Beckman, daughter of Pennsylvania's Deputy Secretary of Banking Irland McKnight Beckman and family psychology author Elizabeth B. Hurlock. In 1980, Stephanie Abramson became its first female law partner; she was later an adjunct professor of clinical law and director of law and business experiential classes at New York University School of Law.

=== 21st century ===
Morgan, Lewis & Bockius originally held the domain name MLB.com, which it transferred to Major League Baseball in September 2000. MLB Commissioner Rob Manfred, elected in 2015, is an alumnus of the firm.

In 2012, Ted Cruz, a Morgan Lewis partner and head of the U.S. Supreme Court and Appellate Litigation practice, left Morgan Lewis upon becoming a United States Senator.

Jami McKeon, who joined the firm in 1981, became its first female chair in 2014. Re-elected in 2018, under her leadership, Morgan Lewis expanded into one of the largest law firms in the world, and received annual Gold Standard Certification from the Women in Law Empowerment Forum (WILEF). McKeon's term as chair concludes in September 2026.

In 2015, Morgan Lewis filed a historic amicus brief for the definitive Supreme Court case of Obergefell v. Hodges, on behalf of 379 companies, including Apple, Google, Microsoft, Amazon, Walmart, JPMorgan Chase, and the New England Patriots, which argued "a business case for legalizing same-sex marriage across the country." The firm is an affiliate firm of the Minority Corporate Counsel Association (MCCA).

In February 2018, Morgan Lewis published findings of its investigation into sexual harassment at NPR, led by labor and employment partner Grace Speights. The findings precipitated the resignation of NPR's senior vice-president of news, Michael Oreskes. That April, former Morgan Lewis partner John Ring was confirmed by the U.S. Senate for a seat on the National Labor Relations Board (NLRB), one of several firm partners who have served on the NLRB, including Harry Johnson and senior counsel Charles Cohen, and, later, Crystal Carey, confirmed as its general counsel in late 2025. Following his NLRB tenure, in 2023, Ring resumed practicing at Morgan Lewis.

In March 2019, Chai Feldblum, former Equal Employment Opportunity Commission member and lead drafter of the Employment Non-Discrimination Act, became a partner of Morgan Lewis.

In November 2023, amid clashes at some universities following the start of the 2023 Israel-Hamas war; Morgan, Lewis & Bockius was among more than two dozen law firms that submitted a letter to 14 American law school deans, denouncing anti-Semitism, Islamophobia, and racism, and advising those mentoring future law graduates of entrenched workplace policies against harassment or discrimination at their firms.

Morgan Lewis announced a strategic partnership, in December 2023, to furnish input and beta testing, aimed at helping to shape legal AI tools in development by Thomson Reuters.

Morgan Lewis unanimously elected the head of its employment practice, David A. McManus, to a five-year term as chair, in March 2026. The 30-year firm veteran assumed leadership on October 1, succeeding Jami McKeon, and installed a global leadership team. In an interview, he assured Law360 that Morgan Lewis remained committed to pro bono and community service. Based in the firm’s Boston and New York City offices, the day after McManus acceded to chair, its pending Manhattan relocation from Park Avenue to nearby 1251 Avenue of the Americas was announced. The following week, a 12-member leadership council for its offices in Europe, the Middle East and Asia (EMEA) was introduced.

== Mergers and office locations ==
Morgan Lewis was a forerunner of multinational law firms when its first international office opened in London in 1981, growing to over 2000 legal professionals worldwide by 2017, with 33 offices in Abu Dhabi; Beijing; Boston; Brussels; Century City, California; Chicago; Costa Mesa, California; Dallas; Dubai; Frankfurt; Hartford, Connecticut; Hong Kong; Houston; Almaty and Astana, Kazakhstan; London; Los Angeles; Miami; Munich; New York; Palo Alto (Silicon Valley), California; Paris; Philadelphia; Pittsburgh; Princeton, New Jersey; Riyadh; San Francisco; Seattle; Shanghai; Singapore; Tokyo; Washington, D.C.; and Wilmington, Delaware.

On November 14, 2014, the firm's partnership voted to admit 227 partners from Bingham McCutchen LLP into the firm as partners, making Morgan Lewis one of the largest law firms in the world, with the addition of 750 partners, attorneys, and staff joining Morgan Lewis on November 24, 2014.

In 2015, Morgan Lewis and Singapore's Stamford Law Corporation announced a combination that created a fully integrated law firm in Singapore.

In June 2022, Morgan Lewis opened an office in Seattle with a 34-member team, including 19 lawyers, 14 of whom joined the firm from Calfo Eakes.

In January 2025, the firm absorbed a 54-attorney team in Paris, where it has operated since 1999, from rival law firm Kramer Levin Naftalis & Frankel. That November, Morgan Lewis opened its third Middle East office, in Riyadh.

== Representation ==
Morgan, Lewis & Bockius clients include nearly 90 per cent of all Fortune 100 companies, in 2025. It was noted, in 2017, as representing over half of Fortune 500 and Fortune Global 100 companies, and nearly half of all Fortune Global 500 companies.

Pro bono clients have included John Thompson (1963–2017), represented by Michael L. Banks and J. Gordon Cooney Jr., whose execution was stayed in 1999 based on forensic evidence which had been "deliberately hidden" by a former assistant prosecutor; Thompson was finally freed in 2003. Attorneys Christina K. Harper and George Cumming waged a successful 11-year pro bono legal battle to gain freedom for Kelly Savage, whose sentence for a 1995 murder conviction was commuted in 2017 by California Governor Jerry Brown.

Represented pro bono by Morgan Lewis & Bockius, with Lambda Legal and Immigration Equality; in October 2020, the United States Department of State withdrew its appeal of the verdict in Kiviti v. Pompeo, and declined to appeal Mize-Gregg v. Pompeo. Federal district courts ruled the State Department's refusal to recognize children born overseas to married same-sex, American citizen couples as U.S. citizens to be unlawful in both cases. Both cases successfully challenged the State Department's policy of denying children born outside of the U.S. to some American same-sex, married couples birthright citizenship.

As outside counsel, the firm has represented Elon Musk, including in a lawsuit filed by former Twitter executives, in April 2024, alleging that Musk and X Corp withheld severance pay.

=== U.S. presidents and presidential candidates ===
Morgan Lewis has represented several prominent politicians in various venues, including:

- Donald Trump – Morgan, Lewis & Bockius represented United States President Donald Trump, advising him and the Trump Organization from 2005 to January 2021. Critics have accused Morgan Lewis of aiding Trump in using his presidential office for personal gain. The Wallace Global Fund fired Morgan Lewis over its ties to Trump. Morgan Lewis issued a letter in May 2017 stating they had examined Trump's tax returns and found no significant financial connection to Russia. Sheri Dillon, a member of the firm, is Donald Trump's former tax attorney.
- Partner James Hamilton was one of three assistant chief counselors of the United States Senate Watergate Committee during 1973 - 1974, the findings of which prompted the impeachment process against Richard Nixon that led to Nixon's resignation on August 9, 1974. Hamilton was reported by the Washingtonian, in 2016, as the "go-to guy for Democratic nominees in search of a vice-presidential pick;" he has vetted running mates for:
  - Hillary Clinton, in 2016
  - Barack Obama (with Eric Holder and Caroline Kennedy), in 2008
  - John Kerry, in 2004
  - Al Gore, in 2000.

== Recognition ==
In 2025, Vault named Morgan Lewis as the No. 1 best law firm for compensation, the No. 2 best law firm to work for, and the top firm for pro bono. The firm also placed 10th in The American Lawyer's 2025 ALM AmLaw 200 list, which ranks U.S. law firms by gross revenue.

Morgan Lewis ranked 11th in the 2024 Global 200 survey. In September 2024, The Lawyer recognized Morgan Lewis as one of the top 10 international firms in its Global Litigation 50 report.

In 2023, Morgan Lewis received a perfect score on the Human Rights Campaign Foundation's Corporate Equality Index, receiving an Equality 100 Award. Since 2008, Morgan Lewis has been named annually as among the "Best Places to Work for LGBT Equality" by the Human Rights Campaign (HRC).

== See also ==
- List of largest United States-based law firms by head count
- List of largest law firms by profits per partner
- List of largest law firms by revenue
