= Francis Draper Lewis =

American lawyer

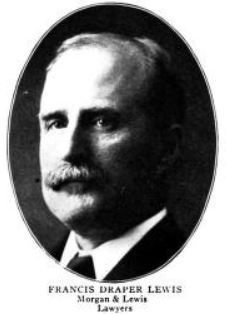

Francis Draper Lewis was a Pennsylvania lawyer who co-founded the law firm Morgan Lewis at Philadelphia in 1873 with Charles Eldridge Morgan, Jr.

== Early life and marriage ==
Born in Boston on August 29, 1849, his parents were Ann Homer (née Kidder) Lewis and Joseph W. Lewis, Lewis Brothers & Company dry-goods wholesale merchant. (Note: Lewis was a descendant of James Draper, an early settler of the Massachusetts Bay Colony, and of Puritan pioneer Georges Lewes (1600 - 1663), an early settler at Plymouth Colony. Lewis, a clothier-turned-farmer, also became an early surveyor of highways, and was appointed constable of the town of Barnstable in 1651.) (Note: His first cousin, William Draper Lewis, became Dean of University of Pennsylvania Law School in 1896.)

On April 28, 1887, he married Mary Humphreys Chandler, daughter of Charles Wesley Chandler (1833 - 1882) and Julia Adelaide Peabody. (Note: Chandler was the great-granddaughter of noted American pioneer physician, Jesse Chandler (1764 – 1814), who succumbed to a severe fever known as "the cold plague" in 1814, (later referenced as "Erysipelatous fever" and "Epidemic Erysipelatous Inflammation"); Dr. Chandler's brother, Captain John Chandler, is the namesake of Chandlersville, Ohio.)

== Education and career ==
Lewis graduated from Amherst College in 1869, then from Harvard Law School in 1871. He was admitted to the Pennsylvania Bar in 1872 and began his practice in the offices of John Christian Bullitt.

On March 10, 1873, Lewis and Charles Eldridge Morgan, Jr. co-founded law firm Morgan Lewis, which became Morgan, Lewis & Bockius in 1883.
