= William B. Draper =

William Bemis Draper (1804 - April 17, 1885) was an importer and president of the Flushing National Bank (today, National Bank of New York City) in Flushing, New York.

== Biography ==
He was one of seventeen children of Simeon Draper. His brother, Simeon, was Collector of the Port of New York (1864 - 1865). The last of the seventeen siblings to survive, Draper was born in Brookfield, Massachusetts.

For many years he was a member of the firm Draper, Cumble & Company. As a young man he established a branch of the silk importing firm in Paris, France. He retired from business in 1865. Draper was a fervent Republican Party (United States) member.

He died in 1885 at the age of 81. He was survived by a daughter, Mrs. Robert S. Browne, of Flushing. His funeral took place at St. George's Church in Flushing, and he was buried in Brookfield.
