= Herbert Wechsler =

American legal scholar (1909–2000)

- Born: December 4, 1909; New York City, U.S.
- Died: April 26, 2000 (aged 90); New York City, U.S.
- Education: City College of New York (BA); Columbia University (LLB)
- Occupations: Law professor; author
- Employer: Columbia Law School
- Awards: Henry J. Friendly Medal (1993)

Herbert Wechsler (December 4, 1909 – April 26, 2000) was an American legal scholar and former director of the American Law Institute (ALI). He is most widely known for his constitutional law scholarship and for the creation of the Model Penal Code. The Journal of Legal Studies has identified Wechsler as one of the most cited legal scholars of the 20th century.

== Early life and education ==
Wechsler entered City College of New York at 16 and graduated in 1928, with a bachelor's degree in French. He enrolled at Columbia Law School, where he served as editor-in-chief of the Columbia Law Review and graduated in 1931. After graduation, he joined the faculty and took a one-year leave to clerk for Justice Harlan F. Stone of the Supreme Court of the United States.

== Lawyer ==
In 1940, Wechsler went to Washington, D.C., to work for the Department of Justice. He argued five cases in front of the Supreme Court of the United States during that period.

During World War II, Wechsler served as assistant attorney general in charge of the War Division. This included leading the United States' defense in Korematsu v. United States, the leading case challenging the Internment of Japanese Americans during World War II.

In 1945 and 1946, Wechsler was a principal assistant to US Judge Francis Biddle and US Alternate Judge John J. Parker at the Nuremberg trials, the trials of the principal Nazi war criminals. He then returned to Columbia Law School, where he would remain an active professor until taking emeritus status in 1978.

In 1959, Wechsler delivered a lecture at Harvard Law School called "Toward Neutral Principles of Constitutional Law." It was also around this time that Wechsler authored a number of casebooks that changed ideas about criminal law and the federal courts. In 1963, Wechsler's proposed official draft of the Model Penal Code was approved, bringing to a close a decade-long project at the American Law Institute. Wechsler's wife, Doris Wechsler, noted that he considered the Model Code to be his greatest achievement. Shortly after the approval of the Model Code, he was named director of the Institute, a position which he held until 1984.

In 1964, Wechsler argued the seminal case New York Times v. Sullivan before the Supreme Court. In New York Times, the court unanimously held that the First and Fourteenth Amendments barred awards of damages to a public official for defamation relating to his or her official conduct unless the public official proves "actual malice."

Wechsler served as the first chair of the New York Commission on Judicial Nomination from 1977 until 1982.

== Accomplishments ==
During Wechsler's tenure as director, the American Law Institute completed the second Restatements of conflict of laws, contracts, judgments, and torts, as well as the original Restatement of U.S. foreign relations law and large parts of the second Restatement of property. The Institute also conducted various studies in federal taxation and completed the Federal Securities Code, the Model Land Development Code, the Model Code of Pre-Arraignment Procedure, the Study of the Division of Jurisdiction Between State and Federal Courts, and made major revisions to the Uniform Commercial Code. The ALI's Principles of Corporate Governance and the current Restatement of Foreign Relations Law of the United States were also conceived, initiated, and developed under his direction.

Following his retirement as director of the ALI in 1984, Wechsler remained active in the Institute's activities as a member of the council until his death in 2000.

== Awards and honors ==
In 1993, Wechsler became the third recipient of the American Law Institute's Henry J. Friendly Medal for "outstanding achievement in promoting reform and clarification of the law" and for the way that his "outstanding intelligence, integrity, and devotion to the law... enriched the subjects of Constitutional Law, Criminal Law, and Federal Jurisdiction, as well as legal thinking generally."

Wechsler also received the Association Medal of the New York City Bar Association for exceptional contributions to the honor and standing of the bar in the community.

Wechsler was a member of both the American Academy of Arts and Sciences and the American Philosophical Society.

== See also ==
- List of law clerks for the ninth seat of the Supreme Court of the United States

Academic offices
Preceded by Herbert Funk Goodrich	Director of the American Law Institute; 1963–1984	Succeeded by Geoffrey C. Hazard, Jr.
