= Uniting American Families Act =

2013 U.S. bill

Legislative history
- Bill citation: H.R. 519; S. 296
- Introduced by: Rep. Jerry Nadler (D-NY); Sen. Patrick Leahy (D-VT)
- Introduced: February 5, 2013

Uniting American Families Act of 2013
- Long title: To amend the Immigration and Nationality Act to promote family unity, and for other purposes.
- Announced in: the 113th United States Congress
- Sponsored by: Rep. Jerrold Nadler (D‑NY 10th)
- Number of co-sponsors: 16

Codification
- Acts affected: Cuban Adjustment Act, Cuban Refugee Adjustment Act, Immigration and Nationality Act, LIFE Act, Miscellaneous Appropriations Act, 2001
- Agencies affected: Department of Homeland Security,

Legislative history
- Introduced in the House as H.R. 519 by Rep. Jerrold Nadler (D, NY-10) on February 5, 2013; Committee consideration by United States House Committee on the Judiciary,

The Uniting American Families Act (UAFA, H.R. 519, S. 296) is a U.S. bill to amend the Immigration and Nationality Act of 1952 to eliminate discrimination in immigration by permitting permanent partners of United States citizens and of lawful permanent residents to obtain lawful permanent resident status in the same manner as spouses of citizens and of lawful permanent residents and to penalize immigration fraud in connection with permanent partnerships. If the partnership ends within two years, the sponsored partner's immigrant status would be subject to review.

Beginning in the 111th Congress, the full text of UAFA, further expanded to provide rights to the children or stepchildren of the foreign-born partner, has been included as Title II of the Reuniting Families Act (H.R. 717), an immigration reform bill, last introduced in the United States House of Representatives on February 14, 2013, by California Congressman Michael Honda (D-CA).

UAFA was introduced on February 13, 2013, in the United States Senate by Vermont Senator Patrick Leahy (D-VT) and in the United States House of Representatives by New York Congressman Jerrold Nadler (D-NY). The Senate version has 29 cosponsors. The Senate legislation has been referred to the Senate Committee on the Judiciary. Most of the cosponsors are Democrats and there is little Republican support for the legislation. The 2013 bill was cosponsored by Republican Congressmen Charlie Dent and Richard L. Hanna.

There are an estimated 36,000 same-sex binational couples in 2000, according to the Census, who could benefit from this act.

== Definitions of Permanent Partner and Permanent Partnership ==
UAFA includes the following definitions:

The term "permanent partner" means an individual 18 years of age or older who--

(A) is in a committed, intimate relationship with another individual 18 years of age or older in which both parties intend a lifelong commitment;

(B) is financially interdependent with that other individual;

(C) is not married to or in a permanent partnership with anyone other than that other individual;

(D) is unable to contract with that other individual a marriage cognizable under this Act; and

(E) is not a first, second, or third degree blood relation of that other individual.

The term "permanent partnership" means the relationship that exists between two permanent partners.

== Legislative history ==
Congress	Short title	Bill number(s)	Date introduced	Sponsor	# of cosponsors (excluding sponsor)	Latest status
106th Congress	Permanent Partners Immigration Act of 2000	H.R. 3650	February 14, 2000	Rep. Jerry Nadler (D-NY)	59	Died in House Subcommittee on Immigration and Claims
107th Congress	Permanent Partners Immigration Act of 2001	H.R. 690	February 14, 2001	Rep. Jerry Nadler (D-NY)	106	Died in House Subcommittee on Immigration and Claims
108th Congress	Permanent Partners Immigration Act of 2003	H.R. 832	February 13, 2003	Rep. Jerry Nadler (D-NY)	129	Died in House Subcommittee on Immigration, Border Security and Claims
108th Congress	Permanent Partners Immigration Act of 2003	S. 1510	July 31, 2003	Sen. Patrick Leahy (D-VT)	12	Died in Senate Judiciary Committee
109th Congress	Permanent Partners Immigration Act; Uniting American Families Act	H.R. 3006	June 21, 2005	Rep. Jerry Nadler (D-NY)	115	Died in House Subcommittee on Immigration, Border Security, and Claims
109th Congress	Permanent Partners Immigration Act; Uniting American Families Act	S. 1278	June 21, 2005	Sen. Patrick Leahy (D-VT)	13	Died in Senate Judiciary Committee
110th Congress	Uniting American Families Act of 2007	H.R. 2221	May 8, 2007	Rep. Jerry Nadler (D-NY)	118	Died in House Subcommittee on Immigration, Citizenship, Refugees, Border Security, and International Law
110th Congress	Uniting American Families Act of 2007	S. 1328	May 8, 2007	Sen. Patrick Leahy (D-VT)	18	Died in Senate Judiciary Committee
111th Congress	Uniting American Families Act of 2009	H.R. 1024	February 12, 2009	Rep. Jerry Nadler (D-NY)	135	Died in House Subcommittee on Immigration, Citizenship, Refugees, Border Security, and International Law
111th Congress	Uniting American Families Act of 2009	S. 424	February 12, 2009	Sen. Patrick Leahy (D-VT)	25	Died in Senate Judiciary Committee
111th Congress	Reuniting Families Act (Title II: Uniting American Families Act)	H.R. 2709	June 4, 2009	Rep. Michael Honda (D-CA)	81	Died in House Judiciary Committee
112th Congress	Uniting American Families Act of 2011	H.R. 1537	April 14, 2011	Rep. Jerry Nadler (D-NY)	144	Died in House Judiciary Committee.
112th Congress	Uniting American Families Act of 2011	S. 821	April 14, 2011	Sen. Patrick Leahy (D-VT)	29	Died in Senate Judiciary Committee
112th Congress	Reuniting Families Act (Title II: Uniting American Families Act)	H.R. 1796	May 6, 2011	Rep. Michael Honda (D-CA)	78	Died in House Judiciary Committee.
113th Congress	Uniting American Families Act of 2013	H.R. 519	February 5, 2013	Rep. Jerry Nadler (D-NY)	139	Referred to the House Judiciary Committee.
113th Congress	Uniting American Families Act of 2013	S. 296	February 13, 2013	Sen. Patrick Leahy (D-VT)	30	Referred to Senate Judiciary Committee
113th Congress	Reuniting Families Act (Title II: Uniting American Families Act)	H.R. 717	February 14, 2013	Rep. Michael Honda (D-CA)	68	Referred to House Judiciary Committee.

In the House of Representatives the bill was referred to the United States House Judiciary Subcommittee on Immigration, Citizenship, Refugees, Border Security, and International Law. This subcommittee has sixteen members including the Chairman Zoe Lofgren (D-CA) and ranking member Representative Steve King (R-IA). The subcommittee consists of representatives from the states of California, Texas, Illinois, Utah, Iowa, Mississippi, New York and Resident Commissioner Pedro Pierluisi (D) from Puerto Rico. The subcommittee has six Republicans and ten Democrats on board.

In the Senate the bill was referred to the Senate Committee on the Judiciary which consists of nineteen members which includes Chairman Patrick Leahy (D-VT) who re-introduced the bill and Ranking Member Senator Jefferson Sessions (R-AL). The committee consists of seven Republican Senators and twelve Democratic Senators. The Representatives on the committee come from seventeen different states; this differs vastly from the subcommittee to which the House of Representatives bill has been referred to. Senator Patrick Leahy held a hearing on the bill on June 3, 2009. The hearing was the first-ever hearing on the Uniting American Families Act. In the opinion of the national organization, Immigration Equality, the hearing was a fundamental and important first step for bringing UAFA into comprehensive immigration reform.

On December 15, 2009, Congressman Luis Gutiérrez (D-IL) introduced his comprehensive immigration reform bill, H.R. 4321, the Comprehensive Immigration Reform for America's Security and Prosperity Act of 2009 (CIR ASAP Act). Initially, it did not include UAFA, which upset many gay rights activists. However, on July 15, 2010, Congressman Gutiérrez announced, "provisions of UAFA must be part of any comprehensive immigration reform bill." Senator Charles Schumer wrote a letter to his LGBT constituency in March 2010 indicating that he is currently working with colleagues of both parties to work on comprehensive immigration reform. This comprehensive immigration reform, which in Senator Schumer's mind is more effective than "piecemeal legislation", will address the issue in the Uniting American Families Act. An important political issue with UAFA revolves around the principle of family reunification; many conservatives do not want to be seen as anti-family reunification, especially with the growing Latino voter base. Of note, is the fact that forty percent of LGBT binational couples in the United States include a Latino family member.

== Effects of Obergefell v. Hodges Supreme Court decision ==
In response to Obergefell v. Hodges Secretary of Homeland Security Janet Napolitano issued a statement on July 1, 2013, clarifying that LGBT spouses and fiancés would henceforth be treated the same as heterosexual couples for immigration purposes. This eliminated the need for a stand-alone bill.

== Support for Uniting American Families Act ==
The support for the Uniting American Families Act has increased in the House of Representatives, but much less so in the Senate. Organizations such as the Human Rights Campaign (HRC) and Immigration Equality, both supporters of LGBT rights legislation, support the bill. The HRC points out that the process for sponsoring a partner will have the same requirements that opposite-sex couples face. HRC also reports that 22 countries recognize same-sex couples under immigration law, including France, Germany, Israel, and the United Kingdom, among others. The American Civil Liberties Union wrote in a letter of support for UAFA to senators that the bill does not provide special benefits for same-sex couples, but provides equal sponsorship. The ACLU also mentions that the bill follows traditional family reunification principles in immigration law that are already commonplace in various countries. The Mexican American Legal Defense and Education Fund (MALDEF) supports UAFA and asks that comprehensive immigration reform include lesbian and gay immigrants.

Several corporations and organizations, such as Intel Corporation and the Hotel Employees and Restaurant Employees Union, have expressed support for the bill. The Immigration Equality website has a list of organizations, labor unions, civil rights groups, religious institutions, and businesses that support the bill including Parents, Families and Friends of Lesbians and Gays, the U.S. Conference of Mayors, League of United Latin American Citizens, American Bar Association, American Airlines and the American Jewish Committee.

== Opposition to Uniting American Families Act ==
Opponents believe that UAFA could open up the doors for Illegal immigration even though it would penalize those who attempt to evade immigration law. They believe that it will be hard for immigration officers to actually determine whether the partnership is long-term and permanent. The Center for Immigration Studies does not support the bill because, in their opinion, it does not provide a reliable measure for indicating who is in a long-term committed partnership. While previously supporting family reunification legislation, such as H.R. 6638, the United States Conference of Catholic Bishops does not support the inclusion of the Uniting American Families Act in a larger bill or standing on its own. National Hispanic Christian Leadership Conference's (NHCLC) leader Reverend Samuel Rodriguez predicts that the wide and strong support that the NHCLC has garnered for comprehensive immigration reform will be lost if same-sex couples are to benefit from the reform.

Roy Beck, the founder of NumbersUSA, an which works for lower immigration levels, opposed the Act.

== Coverage of different-sex couples ==
The bill's language applies only to applicable LGBT individuals and excludes different-sex couples from becoming permanent partners under its provisions. Same-sex couples with valid marriage certificates are prohibited from being considered "married" under this act and can only apply for visas as permanent partners. Due to the inability to be recognized as married partners under this act, the act then allows individuals who have had the opportunity in other states and countries to be married, but have chosen not to, the same immigration rights as those who have pursued marriage.

Although the bill is designed to align the rights of same-sex couples with those of different-sex couples, binational same-sex couples are unlikely to resemble different-sex couples. This could be due to international immigration law, especially in the case of financial interdependence if certain countries require finances to be kept separate in these cases, thus already excluding some couples and asking more than what different-sex couples must prove.
