= List of Phillips Academy alumni =

The following is a list of notable past students of Phillips Academy (also known as Phillips Academy Andover) and of the former Abbot Academy (Phillips became coeducational in 1973 by merging with its sister school).

== A ==
- Joseph Carter Abbott, Union Army general; North Carolina congressman and lawyer
- Hafsat Abiola, Nigerian political activist; winner of 1999 Women to Watch Award from the Association of Women's Development (graduated 1992)
- Ernie Adams, director of Football Research, New England Patriots (graduated 1971)
- Chris Agee, poet, essayist and editor living in Ireland (graduated 1974)
- Kurt E. Alexander, Governor of the 18th Judicial Circuit, The Florida Bar, and attorney (graduated 1982)
- Wallace M. Alexander (1869–1939), heir, corporate director, philanthropist
- Jonathan Alter, senior editor and columnist at Newsweek (graduated 1975)
- Julia Alvarez, author (graduated 1967)
- Adelbert Ames Jr., scientist
- Carl Andre, minimalist artist (graduated 1953)
- James T. Austin, 22nd Massachusetts attorney general (graduated 1794)

== B ==
- Joseph Bae, co-CEO of KKR & Co. (graduated 1990)
- Thomas J. Baldrige, Pennsylvania attorney general and Superior Court president judge (graduated 1892)
- Sullivan Ballou, Union soldier (graduated 1849)
- Alexander Bannwart, businessman (graduated 1902)
- Charles Barber, author on mental health and psychiatric issues
- Lisa Barlow, photographer ( graduated 1976)
- John Barres, current Roman Catholic bishop of Rockville Centre
- Ed Bass, Texas billionaire philanthropist (graduated 1963)
- Robin Batteau, composer, singer-songwriter (graduated 1965)
- James Phinney Baxter III, former president of Williams College and Pulitzer Prize winner
- Willow Bay, CNN news anchor (graduated 1981)
- Henry C. Beck III, CEO, The Beck Group (graduated 1973)
- Bruce Beemer, former Pennsylvania attorney general and current Pennsylvania inspector general (graduated 1987)
- Bill Belichick, coach of New England Patriots (graduated 1971)
- James Bell, New Hampshire politician and lawyer
- Charles R. Bentley, glaciologist and geophysicist
- Paul R. Berger, engineering professor and IEEE fellow (graduated 1981)
- John Berman, CNN senior news anchor and journalist (graduated 1990)
- Michael Beschloss, historian (graduated 1973)
- Hiram Bingham III, archaeologist; rediscovered ruins of Machu Picchu (graduated 1894)
- David B. Birney, Union general in the American Civil War
- Jennifer Bishop, Baltimore-based photojournalist (graduated 1975)
- H.G. "Buzz" Bissinger, author of Friday Night Lights and Pulitzer Prize–winning journalist (graduated 1972)
- Les Blank, independent documentary filmmaker (graduated 1954)
- Humphrey Bogart, actor (attended 1918; expelled)
- Paul Bremer, diplomat notable for his role as administrator of the Coalition Provisional Authority of Iraq following the 2003 invasion (graduated 1959)
- Johnny Broaca, professional baseball player
- Richard Brodhead, president of Duke University (graduated 1964)
- Michael Burlingame, historian (graduated 1960)
- John Horne Burns, author (graduated 1933)
- Edgar Rice Burroughs, author (student until 1894, then transferred to Michigan Military Academy)
- George H. W. Bush, 41st U.S. president (graduated 1942)
- George W. Bush, 43rd U.S. president (graduated 1964)
- Jeb Bush, governor of Florida (graduated 1971)

== C ==
- Norman Cahners, publisher and athlete; qualified for 1936 Olympics but boycotted because games were held in Nazi Germany
- Jonathan G. Callahan, former Wisconsin assemblyman
- Johnson N. Camden Jr., former United States senator from Kentucky
- Steven Cantor, film director and producer; STEP, Dancer, Chasing Tyson, Between Me and My Mind
- Isaac N. Carleton, educator, president of the American Institute of Instruction (graduated 1855)
- Lincoln Chafee, former Rhode Island senator (graduated 1971)
- Levi Chamberlain, missionary
- Otis Chandler, former publisher of the Los Angeles Times (graduated 1946)
- Chang Hee-jin, South Korean Olympic swimmer (graduated 2005)
- Thomas Chapin, jazz saxophonist (graduated 1975)
- Sarah Chayes, expert in religious studies and former Kandahar field director (graduated 1980)
- Susan Chira, editor, The New York Times (graduated 1976)
- Shouson Chow, Hong Kong businessman and leader (graduated 1881)
- George M. Church, professor of genetics, Harvard Medical School; pioneer of human genetics (graduated 1972)
- Sloane Citron, magazine publisher (graduated 1974)
- Stephen Carlton Clark, art collector and philanthropist; founder of the Baseball Hall of Fame (graduated 1899?)
- Christian Clemenson, Emmy Award-winning film and television actor (graduated 1976)
- Harlan Cleveland, U.S. ambassador to NATO under President Lyndon B. Johnson (graduated 1934)
- Raymond C. Clevenger, judge for the U.S. Court of Appeals for the Federal Circuit (graduated 1955)
- Thomas Cochran, banker and philanthropist to Phillips Academy (graduated 1890)
- Charles Codding, New Jersey legislator from 1894 to 1895
- Olivia Coffey, won the gold medal in the quad sculls at the 2015 World Rowing Championships as well as competed in 2016 Summer Olympics & The Boat Race 2018 (graduated 2007)
- William Sloane Coffin, reverend and peace activist (graduated 1942)
- Edwin J. Cohn, protein scientist and blood fractionation expert (graduated 1911)
- Donald B. Cole, instructor in history and dean of Phillips Exeter Academy (graduated 1940)
- Frank Converse, actor (graduated 1956)
- Joseph Cornell, sculptor (graduated 1921)
- Justin Cronin, author (graduated 1980)
- Sumner McKnight Crosby, art historian (graduated 1928)
- Bill Cunliffe, Grammy Award-winning composer, arranger, and jazz pianist (graduated 1974)
- Peter Currie, Netscape executive, investor, and charter trustee of Phillips Academy (graduated 1974)

== D ==
- William Damon, author, psychologist, and Stanford University educator (graduated 1963)
- Lucy Danziger, editor-in-chief of Self magazine (graduated 1978)
- John Darnton, Pulitzer Prize-winning foreign correspondent for the New York Times (graduated 1960)
- Robert Darnton, historian (graduated 1957)
- Benjamin Darrow, New York district attorney (graduated 1879)
- Justin Dart Jr., advocate for the rights of disabled people (graduated 1949)
- Natalie E. Dean (née Exner), assistant professor of Biostatistics at the University of Florida (graduated 2005)
- Jonathan Dee, author (graduated 1980)
- Dana Delany, actress (graduated 1974)
- Sarah Demers, physicist (graduated 1994)
- Zak DeOssie, professional football player for the New York Giants; Super Bowl-winning long snapper (graduated 2003)
- George Horatio Derby, humorist (graduated 1838)
- Norman Dodd, banker, financial adviser and head investigator for the Reece Committee (graduated 1918)
- Tim Draper, venture capital investor and founder of Draper Fisher Jurvetson (DFJ)
- Warren Fales Draper, publisher, educator, and philanthropist; significant donor to Phillips Academy; namesake of Draper Hall and Draper Cottage (graduated 1843)
- Bill Drayton, entrepreneur, coined the phrase "social entrepreneur"
- Charles Duits, writer
- Teddy Dunn, actor (graduated 1999)

== E ==
- Richard Eder, literary critic; winner of the 1987 Pulitzer Prize for Criticism
- Carol Edgarian, author (graduated 1980)
- Alonzo Elliot, composer
- Trey Ellis, novelist, screenwriter (graduated 1980)
- Sam Endicott, singer-songwriter and vocalist for The Bravery (graduated 1992)
- David B. Ensor, CNN correspondent (graduated 1969)
- Harold Perry Erskine, sculptor and architect
- Walker Evans, photographer (graduated 1922)

== F ==
- Charles Finch, author (graduated 1998)
- Charles B. Finch, businessman and political activist
- Tom Finkelpearl, NYC commissioner of cultural affairs (graduated 1974)
- Paul Finnegan, co-founder of Madison Dearborn Partners(graduated 1971)
- David Fishelson, Broadway producer, playwright, filmmaker (graduated 1974)
- Charles L. Flint, lawyer, educator, first secretary of the Massachusetts Board of Agriculture, fourth president of the University of Massachusetts and one of its original founders (graduated 1854)
- Thomas C. Foley, former U.S. ambassador to Ireland (graduated 1971)
- John Murray Forbes, railroad entrepreneur and philanthropist who re-established Milton Academy
- Theodore J. Forstmann, billionaire businessman and philanthropist
- Hollis Frampton, avant-garde filmmaker, photographer, and theoretician (attended 1951 to 1954; never received diploma)
- Peter Franchot, state comptroller of Maryland
- Andy Frankenberger, poker champion
- Ziwe Fumudoh, comedian (graduated 2010)

== G ==
- Robert A. Gardner, two-time U.S. Amateur golf champion
- Jeffrey Garten, dean of the Yale School of Management (graduated 1964)
- Glenn Gass, rock 'n' roll educator (dropped out upper year, would have graduated 1974)
- Isaac Wheeler Geer, railroad executive
- A. Bartlett Giamatti, president of Yale University and seventh Major League Baseball commissioner (graduated 1956)
- Nils Gilman, historian and futurist (graduated 1989)
- Salvador Gómez-Colón, youth activist (graduated 2020)
- Stephanie Gosk, journalist and correspondent for NBC News (graduated 1990)
- David Graeber, professor of anthropology; anarchist (graduated 1978)
- Anthony Grafton, noted scholar (graduated 1967)
- Richard Theodore Greener, first African-American to graduate from Harvard College (graduated 1865)
- Horatio Greenough, sculptor known for U.S. government commissions The Rescue (1837–50), George Washington (1840), and The Discovery of America (1840–43)
- James Greenway, curator, Museum of Comparative Zoology at Harvard University, renowned ornithologist, lt. commander U.S. Navy, intelligence officer with the Office of Naval Intelligence (graduated 1926)
- John Campbell Greenway, general, U.S. Army, Rough Rider, intelligence officer with the Office of Naval Intelligence, mining magnate (graduated 1895 [PhB])
- David L. Gunn, former president of Amtrak (graduated 1955)
- Philip F. Gura, William S. Newman Distinguished Professor of American Literature and Culture, University of North Carolina at Chapel Hill (graduated 1968)

== H ==
- Roderick Stephen Hall, OSS agent murdered by the SS in 1945 (graduated 1934)
- Peter Halley, artist (graduated 1971)
- George Hamlin, tenor; Victor recording artist 1905–1916 (graduated 1889)
- Thomas H. Harvey Jr., U.S. Army officer and Distinguished Service Cross recipient (graduated 1954)
- Garnet Hathaway, ice hockey forward for the NHL's Washington Capitals (graduated 2010)
- Julian Hatton, abstract landscape artist (graduated 1974)
- Brian Henson, president of Jim Henson Productions (graduated 1982)
- Samuel Prescott Hildreth, pioneer physician, scientist, and chronicler of the early settlement of the Northwest Territory
- Frank Lauren Hitchcock, MIT mathematician (graduated 1892?)
- Oliver Wendell Holmes Sr., author (graduated 1825)
- Fred A. Howland, secretary of state of Vermont and president of National Life Insurance Company (graduated 1883)
- Thomas J. Hudner Jr., U.S. Navy officer and Medal of Honor recipient (graduated 1943)
- Chris Hughes, co-founder of Facebook; publisher and editor-in-chief of The New Republic (graduated 2002)
- Angela Hur, author (graduated 1998)

== I ==
- Eugen Indjic, classical pianist (graduated 1965)
- Robert Ingersoll, former United States deputy secretary of state under presidents Richard Nixon and Gerald Ford (graduated 1933)

== J ==
- Thomas H. Jackson, former president of the University of Rochester (graduated 1968)
- Edward Hopkins Jenkins, director of the Connecticut Agricultural Experiment Station (graduated 1868)
- Clay Johnson III, deputy director of the United States Office of Management and Budget (graduated 1964)
- Osgood Johnson, 5th principal of Phillips Academy (graduated 1823)

== K ==
- Peter Kapetan (1956–2008), Broadway actor, singer, and dancer (graduated 1974)
- Marsha Kazarosian, trial attorney (graduated 1974)
- R. Crosby Kemper Jr., banker and philanthropist, namesake of the Kemper Museum of Contemporary Art
- Charles West Kendall, U.S. representative, lawyer, and newspaper editor
- Mel Kendrick, artist (graduated 1967)
- John F. Kennedy Jr., publisher, son of former U.S. president John F. Kennedy (graduated 1979)
- Max Kennedy, author (expelled)
- Patrick J. Kennedy, former U.S. representative from Rhode Island (graduated 1986)
- Vanessa Kerry, physician and health care administrator who founded the non-profit Seed Global Health, daughter of John Kerry
- Prince Rahim Aga Khan, son of the Aga Khan IV (graduated 1990)
- Victor K. Kiam, businessman and owner of the New England Patriots (graduated 1944)
- Brian Kibler, game designer and professional Magic: the Gathering player
- Tracy Kidder, Pulitzer Prize winner for Soul of the New Machine (graduated 1963)
- Richard H. Kimball, venture capitalist (graduated 1974)
- William King, first governor of Maine (graduated 1781)
- Karl Kirchwey, poet (graduated 1974)
- Jonathan Philip Klein, dog behavior consultant (graduated 1974)
- John Kluge Jr., philanthropist, investor, son of John Kluge (graduated 2001)
- William Standish Knowles, winner of the 2001 Nobel Prize in Chemistry (graduated 1935)
- Lawrence Kohlberg, psychologist (graduated 1945)
- Chris Kreider, player for Boston College hockey team, and then New York Rangers (graduated 2010)
- Erik S. Kristensen, lieutenant commander, United States Navy SEALs; killed in action during Operation Red Wings (graduated 1991)
- James Simon Kunen, author, journalist known for writing The Strawberry Statement

== L ==
- Raymond A. Lamontagne, philanthropist
- John Lardner, sports writer (graduated 1929)
- Ring Lardner Jr., Academy Award-winning screenwriter
- Frank Lavin, former undersecretary for International Trade of the U.S. Department of Commerce (graduated 1975)
- George Ayres Leavitt, early New York publisher (graduated 1840)
- Gary Lee, journalist, travel writer (graduated 1974)
- Nate Lee, writer, senior editor of Newcity in Chicago (graduated 1974)
- Jack Lemmon, actor (graduated 1943)
- Chentung Liang Cheng, Chinese ambassador to the United States (did not graduate)
- I. Lewis "Scooter" Libby, disbarred lawyer, government official, policy advisor, and novelist (graduated 1968)
- Caroline Lind, two-time Olympic gold medalist in rowing (graduated 2002)
- Gordon Lish, editor, author, and teacher (graduated 1952)
- Seth Lloyd, physicist and researcher in quantum information theory (graduated 1978)
- David Longstreth, founding member of rock band The Dirty Projectors
- Alfred Lee Loomis, pioneer of ultrasonics (graduated 1905)
- Phillips Lord, radio program writer, creator, producer and narrator
- Francis Cabot Lowell, businessman, City of Lowell, Massachusetts named after him (graduated 1786)

== M ==
- Heather Mac Donald, political commentator (graduated 1974)
- Moses Macdonald, US congressman (graduated 1827)
- Torbert MacDonald, lawyer and politician
- Lisa MacFarlane, principal of Phillips Exeter Academy (graduated 1975)
- April March, musician and animator
- Mozhan Marnò, actress, writer, director
- George Perkins Marsh, diplomat and philologist; credited as one of the first environmentalists (graduated 1816)
- John Marsh, early pioneer and settler in California; often regarded as the first person to practice medicine in California (graduated 1818)
- Othniel Charles Marsh, first professor of paleontology at Yale University (graduated 1856)
- Laurel Massé, founding member of The Manhattan Transfer (expelled 1969)
- Marcia McCabe, daytime television actor (graduated 1973 from Abbot)
- Barry R. McCaffrey, U.S. general, drug czar (graduated 1960)
- Vance C. McCormick, politician and businessman; chair of the American delegation at the Treaty of Versailles
- Walsh McDermott, medical researcher and public health doctor
- Joe McGlone, football player
- James P. McLane Jr., three-time Olympic champion (graduated 1949)
- Scott Mead, investment banker, photographer, and former partner and managing director of Goldman Sachs (graduated 1973)
- Jonathan Meath, children's TV producer and Santa Claus (graduated 1974)
- Thomas C. Mendenhall, expert of collegiate rowing and former president of Smith College (graduated 1928)
- Thomas Mesereau, attorney whose clients include Robert Blake and Michael Jackson (graduated 1969)
- Charles A. Meyer, former assistant secretary of state for Inter-American Affairs (graduated 1935)
- Marvin Minsky, expert on artificial intelligence, robotics, and computers (graduated 1944)
- Paul Monette, author and activist (graduated 1963)
- John U. Monro, academic administrator and dean of Harvard College
- William Henry Moody, U.S. Supreme Court justice (graduated 1871)
- Edwin V. Morgan, United States ambassador to Brazil 1912–1933
- Samuel Morse, inventor of the single-wire telegraph and Morse Code (graduated 1805)
- Seth Moulton, U.S. congressman representing Massachusetts's 6th Congressional District (graduated 1997)
- Lachlan Murdoch, son of media mogul Rupert Murdoch; chairman of News Corporation (graduated 1990)
- Charles B. G. Murphy, writer and philanthropist; honored with the Charles B.G. Murphy professorship at Yale University (graduated 1923)
- Gerald Clery Murphy, artist, socialite, CEO of Mark Cross (graduated 1908)
- Patrick O. Murphy, mayor of Lowell, Massachusetts

== N ==
- Ted Nace, computer publisher, anti-coal activist (graduated 1974)
- Joseph Hardy Neesima, founder of Doshisha University in Japan (graduated 1867)
- Sara Nelson, former editor-in-chief of Publishers Weekly (graduated 1974)
- Guy Nordenson, structural engineer (graduated 1973)
- William D. Nordhaus, co-recipient of the 2018 Nobel Memorial Prize in Economic Sciences (graduated 1959)
- Lisa Anne Novelline, children's book author

== O ==
- Jens David Ohlin, dean of Cornell Law School (graduated 1992)
- Richard O'Kane, recipient of the Medal of Honor (graduated 1930)
- Frederick Law Olmsted, architect and designer of Central Park (graduated 1838)
- Kevin Olusola, cellist and member of a cappella group Pentatonix (graduated 2006)

== P ==
- Peter Palandjian, CEO of Intercontinental Real Estate Corporation
- Steven C. Panagiotakos, senator
- U.S. Army Major General James Parker, awarded the Medal of Honor (graduated 1870)
- Rufus Parks, Wisconsin politician
- Henry Day Penfield, mayor of Evanston, Illinois
- Jonathan Penner, actor on Survivor: Cook Islands, Survivor: Micronesia, and Survivor: Philippines
- Ross Perlin, linguist and author (graduated 2001)
- Elizabeth Stuart Phelps Ward, early feminist author
- Gerard Piel, journalist (graduated 1933)
- Gilbert Pillsbury, forced to leave Andover after founding its first Abolitionist Society, Massachusetts state senator (1854)
- David Pingree, MacArthur Award-winning Brown University writer (graduated 1950)
- Katie Porter, U.S. congresswoman representing California's 45th Congressional District (graduated 1992)
- Jane Pratt, publisher, founder of Jane magazine (graduated 1980)

== Q ==
- Josiah Quincy, mayor of Boston, 1823–1828; president of Harvard College, 1828–1845 (graduated 1786)

== R ==
- Sarah Rafferty, actress (graduated 1989)
- Herbert H. Ramsay, attorney and president of the United States Golf Association who created many of the standards used in professional golfing (graduated 1905)
- Henry Riggs Rathbone, congressman and lawyer from Illinois; his parents were with Abraham Lincoln when he was shot at Ford's Theater (graduated 1887)
- C. Cybele Raver, developmental psychologist (graduated 1982)
- Paul Reardon, justice of the Massachusetts Supreme Judicial Court (graduated 1927)
- DeForest Richards, fifth governor of Wyoming
- Pete Robbins, jazz saxophonist (graduated 1997)
- Robin L. Rosenberg, U.S. District Court judge (graduated 1979)
- Charles Ruff, lawyer who defended Bill Clinton during his impeachment trial in 1999 (graduated 1956)
- Richard S. Rust, forced to leave Andover after founding its first Abolitionist Society, founder of Wilberforce University, namesake of Rust College
- Frederic Rzewski, composer and pianist (graduated 1954)

== S ==
- Charles G. Sawtelle, U.S. Army brigadier general
- Will Scharf, assistant to the president and White House staff secretary (graduated 2004)
- Pierce Schenck, business executive from Dayton, Ohio
- Stacy Schiff, journalist, biographer, winner of the Pulitzer Prize for her biography of Véra Nabokov (graduated 1978)
- G. David Schine, entrepreneur, businessman, and political activist
- Cory Schneider, New Jersey Devils goaltender (graduated 2004)
- Peter Sellars, theater director (graduated 1975)
- Tanya Selvaratnam, author, actor, producer, and activist (graduated 1988)
- Robert B. Semple Jr., associate editor for the New York Times; Pulitzer Prize winner for environmental editorial writing (graduated 1954)
- James Shannon, former U.S. representative from Massachusetts and former Massachusetts attorney general (graduated 1969)
- Duncan Sheik, musician (graduated 1988)
- Charles Sheldon, leader of the Social Gospel movement (graduated 1879)
- George Pearson Smith, co-recipient of the 2018 Nobel Prize in Chemistry (graduated 1958)
- Peter Plympton Smith, assistant director-general for education at UNESCO and first president of California State University, Monterey Bay (graduated 1964)
- Andong Song, first China-born hockey player to be drafted in the National Hockey League (NHL) (graduated 2016)
- James Spader, actor (class of 1978; dropped out)
- Lyman Spitzer, physicist (graduated 1931)
- Benjamin Spock, pediatrician (graduated 1921)
- Alfred E. Stearns, educator and 9th headmaster of Phillips Academy (graduated 1890)
- Robert B. Stearns, founder of Bear Stearns (graduated 1906)
- Joshua Steiner, financier (graduated 1983)
- Frank Stella, painter (graduated 1954)
- Alexander Stille, journalist (graduated 1974)
- Henry L. Stimson, secretary of state under President Hoover, secretary of war under presidents Taft, F. Roosevelt and Truman
- William H. Sumner, son of Governor Increase Sumner; graduated from Harvard College in 1799; practiced law; general in the Massachusetts militia; wrote The History of East Boston
- Richard K. Sutherland, U.S. Army general during World War II (graduated 1911)
- William Irvin Swoope, U.S. congressman from Pennsylvania

== T ==
- Oscar Tang, Chinese-American investment banker and philanthropist; chairman of board of trustees of Phillips Academy and largest donor in Phillips Academy history (graduated 1956)
- William Davis Taylor, publisher and chair of the Boston Globe (graduated 1927)
- Thomas D. Thacher (1881–1950), one-time solicitor general of the United States
- Evan Thomas, assistant managing editor of Newsweek
- Nicholas Thompson, editor in chief of Wired (graduated 1993)
- William R. Timken, former U.S. ambassador to Germany under George W. Bush (graduated 1956)
- Rufus Tobey (1873), founder of Tufts Childrens Hospital
- William Tong, Connecticut state representative
- Alexander Trowbridge, U.S. secretary of commerce under President Lyndon Johnson; former president, National Association of Manufacturers (graduated 1947)
- Augustus Trowbridge, physicist and Princeton University professor
- Ming Tsai, chef and restaurateur (graduated 1982)

== U ==
- Robert Uihlein Jr., businessman and polo player (graduated 1934)
- James Ramsey Ullman, writer and mountaineer (graduated 1925)

== V ==
- Caroline Van Zile, third solicitor general of Washington, D.C. (graduated 2002)
- Bill Veeck, former owner of the Chicago White Sox (graduated 1932)
- Willard Lamb Velie, grandson of John Deere; developed advanced engines for automobiles and airplanes (graduated 1885)
- William Vickrey, awarded the Nobel Prize in Economics in 1996
- James von Klemperer, architect

== W ==
- Jigme Khesar Namgyel Wangchuck, king of Bhutan
- Daniel S. Weld, professor of Computer Science at the University of Washington (graduated 1978)
- Theodore Dwight Weld, abolitionist (graduated 1820)
- George Whipple, winner of the Nobel Prize for Medicine in 1933 for cure for pernicious anemia
- George M. Whitesides, professor of chemistry at Harvard University
- Reed Whittemore, poet and twice Poet Laureate Consultant in Poetry to the Library of Congress
- Olivia Wilde, actress (graduated 2002)
- Andrew Wilson, American national team swimmer, world championship gold medalist (graduated 2012)
- Dick Wolf, Emmy Award-winning television producer of Miami Vice and Law & Order (graduated 1965)
- Dudley Wolfe, yachtsman, skier and mountaineer (asked to leave 1916)
- Michael M. Wood, former United States ambassador to Sweden
- Francesca Woodman, photographer
- Leonard Woods, fourth president of Bowdoin College
- Christopher A. Wray, director of the FBI (graduated 1985)
- Philip K. Wrigley, manufacturer of Wrigley's Chewing Gum (graduated 1915)
- Timothy Wynter, competed in the 2016 Summer Olympics (graduated 2014)

== Y ==
- Tachi Yamada, president of the Global Health Program, Bill & Melinda Gates Foundation (graduated 1963)
- Carissa Yip, 4-time and current U.S. Women's Chess Champion
- Jesse Colin Young, musician (expelled)

== Z ==
- Dan Zanes, member of The Del Fuegos and children's music writer (graduated 1979)
