= Mel Kendrick =

American sculptor

- Born: 1949 (age 76–77); Boston, Massachusetts
- Education: Phillips Academy, Andover, Trinity College, Connecticut, Hunter College
- Known for: Sculpture
- Awards: Academy Award from the American Academy of Arts & Letters, National Endowment for the Arts Fellowship, Art Omi Francis J. Greenburger Award

Mel Kendrick (born July 28, 1949) is an American visual artist and sculptor known primarily for his abstract, three-dimensional forms derived from sliced and reconstituted wooden blocks. Kendrick's work is understood to reflect a deep fascination with process, space, geometry, and natural forms and materials.

== Early life and education ==
Born in Boston, Massachusetts, Kendrick discovered his interest in art-making through photography at Phillips Academy, Andover, which educated a number of important post-war and contemporary artists including Carl Andre, Carroll Dunham, Peter Halley, and Frank Stella. He continued his art education at Trinity College, Connecticut before he moved to New York City in 1971 to study at Hunter College where he studied under Robert Morris and wrote his masters thesis under the supervision of Tony Smith and apprenticed under Dorothea Rockburne.

== Work ==
Kendrick moved to New York in 1971, where he initially developed a minimalist artistic style, with a strong emphasis on architectural forms and techniques deployed across horizontal space. This approach was influenced by minimalist precursors like Donald Judd, Sol LeWitt, Richard Serra, and Rockburne. His first solo exhibition took place at Artists Space in 1974 where, in an alternative approach, Kendrick painted the gallery floor's margins to match its walls, presenting viewers with a unique challenge to their perceptions of horizontal and vertical space, upon which he arranged pairs of small geometric canvases.

Over the following decade, Kendrick's art practice transitioned to a more architectural style, featuring 'linear' works with spider-like wood formations. However, in 1982, he underwent what he called a "major shift" as he moved away from the intellectual restrictions of minimalism towards a more expressive, materially-focused style. His subsequent works were less premeditated, embracing conventions such as sculptural bases and pedestals, which he felt minimalism had previously discarded. Kendrick favored this approach as it allowed both himself and his audience to interact more directly with the art objects, with the New York Times commenting that the resulting work "looks offhand, but is in fact complex almost to the point of craziness, Piranesi-style."

Often framing sculpture as drawing or "poetry in space," Kendrick has employed a wide range of materials, including wood, bronze, rubber, paper, and cast concrete in his work. "Wielding a chainsaw like a pencil" – Kendrick is said to own five – Kendrick's work has continue to be characterized by its complex and intricate nature, inviting viewers to contemplate the creative process and the relationships between form and function. The artist's retrospective, “Seeing Things in Things,” organized by the Addison Gallery of American Art and later displayed at the Parrish Art Museum, revealed a central aspect of his practice – deconstruction and reconstruction of form, resulting in complex, abstract creations.

== Exhibitions ==
Kendrick has participated in over four dozen solo exhibitions and numerous group exhibitions, showcasing a diverse body of work. Notable solo exhibitions include Artists Space's second-ever show in 1974, "Sculpture" at John Weber Gallery in 1983, the "Markers" series of monumental sculpture in Madison Square Park in 2009, and "Seeing Things in Things" at the Parrish Art Museum and the Addison Gallery of American Art. His work has also been featured in group exhibitions such as "Contemporary Sculpture: Selections from the Collection" at The Art Institute of Chicago, "The Shape of Space: Sculpture from the Collection" at The Metropolitan Museum of Art, "The International Survey of Painting and Sculpture" at the Museum of Modern Art (MoMA), and the 1985 Whitney Biennial.

Kendrick's work is housed in over 30 permanent and museum collections around the world, including the Metropolitan Museum of Art, the Museum of Modern Art, the Whitney Museum of American Art, the Art Institute of Chicago, the Yale University Art Gallery, the Philadelphia Museum of Art, the Museum of Fine Arts, Houston, the High Museum of Art, the Walker Art Center, the Baltimore Museum of Art, the Australian National Gallery, the Museum of Fine Arts, Boston, the Brooklyn Museum, the Addison Gallery of American Art, and the National Gallery of Art.

== Awards ==
Kendrick has received numerous awards and recognitions for his work. Notable accolades include two National Endowment for the Arts fellowships, and an Academy Award from the American Academy of Arts & Letters. In 2008 Kendrick was selected by Brice Marden to receive the Art Omi Francis J. Greenburger Award, an honor bestowed upon artists for their significant contributions to advancing the field of contemporary art. In 2023 Kendrick was elected to the National Academy of Design in recognition for his contributions to contemporary American art.

== Personal life ==
Kendrick lives and works in New York City.
