= Salvador Gómez =

Salvador Gómez may refer to:

- Salvador Gómez (water polo) (born 1968), former water polo player from Spain
- Salvador Videgain Gómez (1845–1906), Spanish actor, singer, producer and composer
- Salvador Gómez, former mayor of Nizao in the Dominican Republic
- Salvador Gómez-Colón (born 2002), youth activist from Puerto Rico
