= WPAA =

WPAA may refer to:

- WPAA (AM), a radio station (1190 AM) licensed to St. Marys, Georgia, United States format is classic country. the station is owned by Blueberry broadcasting inc headed by neal ardman.
- WPAA (Massachusetts), a radio station (91.7 FM) formerly licensed to Andover, Massachusetts, United States, which held the call sign from 1965 to 2004
