= Angela Hur =

American writer

Angela Mi Young Hur
- Born: Los Angeles, California
- Education: Harvard University, 2002 Notre Dame University, 2005
- Occupation: Writer

Angela Mi Young Hur is an American writer based in Sweden. Her debut novel, The Queens of K-Town, was published in 2007 by MacAdam/Cage. Her second novel, Folklorn, is forthcoming from Erewhon in 2021.

== Early life and education ==
Raised in Gardena, California, Hur graduated from Phillips Academy, an Andover, Massachusetts boarding school, in 1998. She graduated from Harvard University in 2002. As a Sparks Fellow, she received her Master of Fine Arts in fiction at Notre Dame in South Bend, Indiana. Graduating in 2005, she won the Sparks Prize, a post-graduate fellowship.

== Career ==
Her debut novel, The Queens of K-Town, was published in 2007 by MacAdam/Cage.

Hur lived in Long Beach, California when The Queens of K-Town was published. She later moved to Seoul, South Korea to take up a position as a lecturer of English Literature and Creative Writing at the Hankuk University of Foreign Studies.

Between 2010 and 2014, Hur lived in Stockholm, Sweden. She worked as an editor for the Stockholm International Peace Research Institute and as a writer for the Korean Cultural Center in Stockholm.

Between 2014 and 2020, Hur lived in the Bay Area, CA. She taught for Writopia, a national non-profit providing writing workshops for kids and teens. She attended Tin House Writer's Workshop in 2017, where her novel Folklorn was chosen by Kelly Link for a Tin House Mentorship. Excerpts have been published in Harvard's Azalea: Journal of Korean Literature and Stockholm University's Two Thirds North.

Her second novel, Folklorn, forthcoming from Erewhon in 2021, was selected as one of "The 30 Most Anticipated SFF Books of 2021" by Tor.Com. Amal El-Mohtar of The New York Times listed Folklorn as one of the Best Science Fiction and Fantasy Books of 2021.

== Works ==
- Hur, Angela Mi Young, Folklorn (2021), Erewhon. ISBN 978-1645660163
- Hur, Angela Mi-Young (2007), The Queens of K-Town (paperback ed.), MacAdam/Cage, ISBN 978-1-59692-244-0
- Hur, Angela Mi-Young (2007), The Queens of K-Town (paperback ed.), MacAdam/Cage, ISBN 978-1-59692-245-7
