= Jennifer Bishop (photojournalist) =

American photojournalist

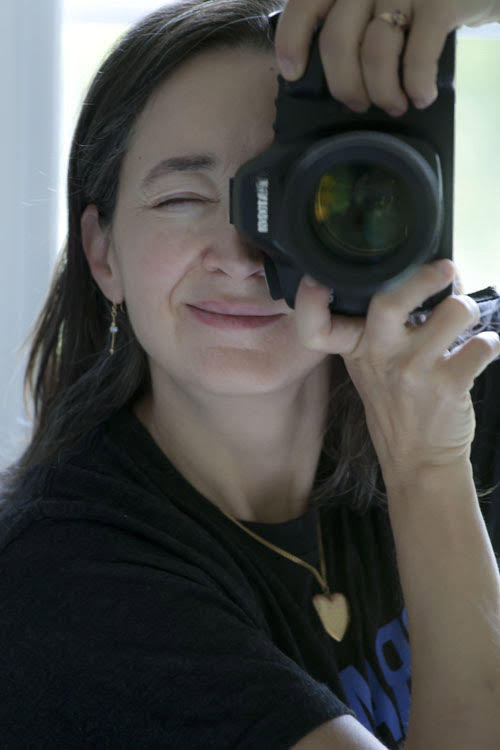
- Born: May 1, 1957 (age 69); Cleveland, Ohio, USA
- Education: Phillips Academy (1975); Johns Hopkins University B.A. 1979
- Occupation: Photojournalist
- Awards: Maryland State Arts Council Awards (2018, 2012, 1993, 1989) TASH Positive Images award (2011) Arc Award of Excellence (2007)
- Website: jenniferbishopphotography.com

Jennifer Bishop is an American photojournalist based in Baltimore who is notable for her street photography. She was one of the founders of the alternative weekly Baltimore City Paper when it began publishing in 1977, and she contributed photographs consistently to the publication from its inception to 1994. She was given her own space, choosing pictures which were "unfettered by second-guessing editors", in which she often recorded "the quirky moments, sudden epiphanies, visual paradoxes and poetic ironies that define the strangeness of everyday life", often of "gritty inner-city neighborhoods."

Bishop contributed photographs to the Baltimore Sun, Baltimore City Paper, Baltimore News-American, The Washington Post magazine, Health magazine, People magazine, USA Today and other publications. In addition to her commercial work for foundations and advertising agencies and institutions, including hospitals with a focus on children and medicine, much of her career has been devoted to chronicling the city of Baltimore. Her work often focuses on advocacy for people with disabilities. In 2006, she started Maryland's first Heart Gallery, a photo exhibit to promote the adoption of children with special needs.

According to the magazine Baltimore Fishbowl, Bishop's documentary style is "quirky and deeply humanistic" with a "compassionate knack for capturing people" in "circumstance-revealing moments." According to Glenn McNatt of the Baltimore Sun, she has an "immensely sensitive antenna for the emotional emanations of ordinary people, conveying the mystery and wonder of everyday life." Critic Michael Olesker wrote that Bishop "denies us cheap sentimentality" and that her pictures offer "wry ironies that look unsettlingly like the truth."

Bishop shot many of her photos on Tri-X film with a minimum of equipment, usually in black and white. Since 2004, she employs color digital photography, shooting with a Nikon mirrorless Z series camera, sometimes converting her images to black and white.

Bishop was born in Cleveland and grew up in Tyringham, Massachusetts.
