= Marcia McCabe =

American soap opera actress

- Born: March 5, 1955 (age 70); Pennsylvania, U.S.
- Education: Abbot Academy
- Alma mater: Rollins College
- Occupation: Actor
- Years active: 1978–present
- Spouse: Christopher Goutman (1985-2016)
- Children: 2
- Relatives: Thomas Bayard McCabe (grandfather)
- Awards: Distinguished Service Award; 2021 Andover

Marcia B. McCabe is an American actress.

== Early life and education ==
Marcia McCabe was born in Pennsylvania, the granddaughter of Scott Paper Company chairman Thomas B. McCabe and of Parade Publications publisher Arthur H. Motley. She graduated from Abbot Academy in 1973 and attended Rollins College before moving to New York City.

== Career ==
McCabe played Sunny Adamson in the daytime television drama Search for Tomorrow from 1978 to 1986. In 1989, she was cast as publishing executive Alicia Grande in One Life to Live. She's also appeared in episodes of Another World, As the World Turns, and All My Children and appeared as herself on the Bob Braun Show, the Match Game Hollywood Squares Hour and the television program entitled Go.

=== Awards and recognition ===
In 2021, she was honored by Phillips Academy for developing regional programming including Meals on Wheels and for her dedication and positive attitude in numerous other Non sibi projects.

== Personal life ==
McCabe married fellow actor and director Christopher Goutman in Pennsylvania in 1985. The couple divorced in 2016.

== Filmography ==
Television
Year	Show	Role
1978-1986	Search for Tomorrow	Sunny Adamson
1988-1989	One Life to Live	Alicia Grande
1992-1993	All My Children	Leslie DuPres
1995	Another World	Bunny Eberhardt
2008	As the World Turns	Carolyn Wheatley

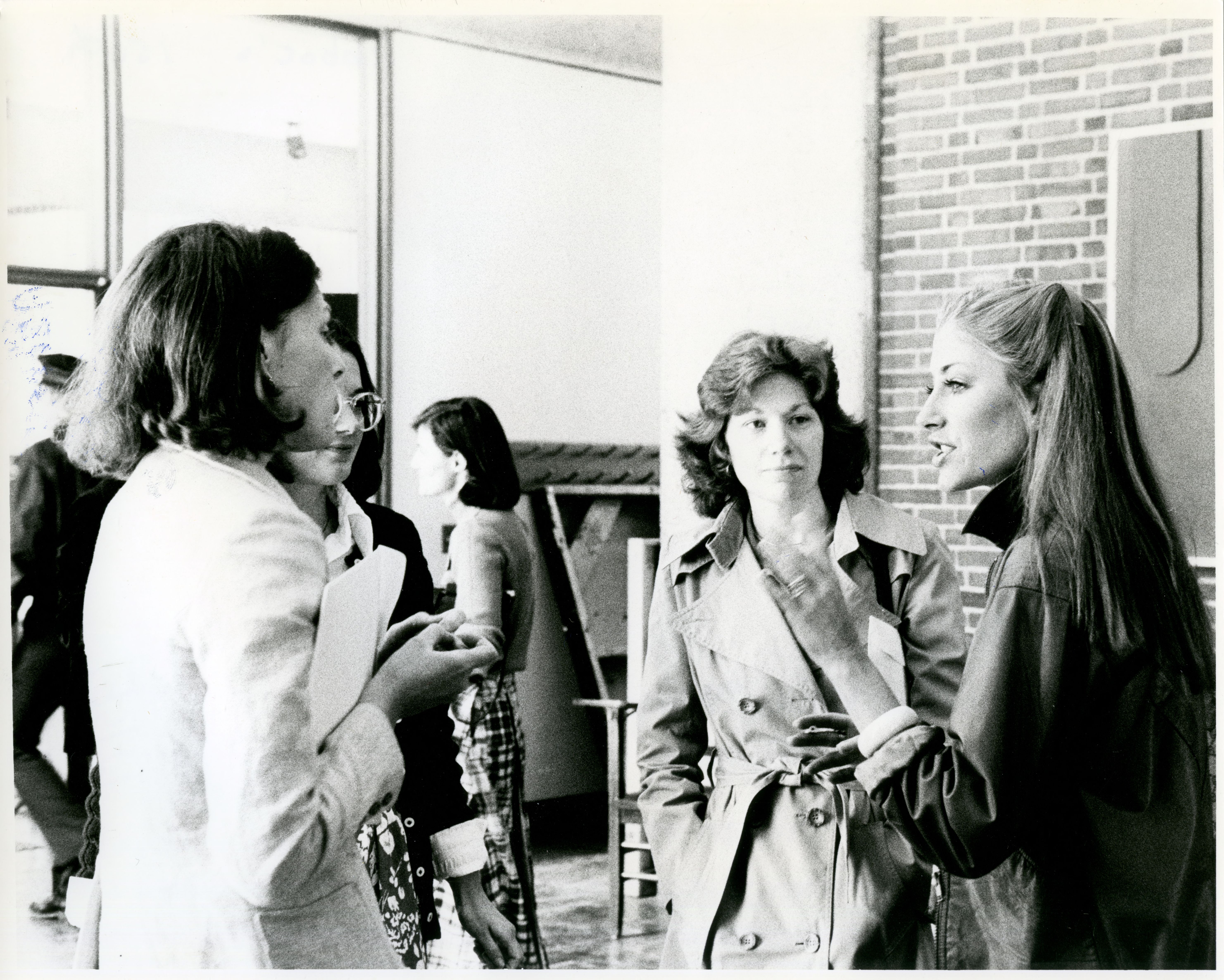
Marcia McCabe (right) in 1979 at the 150th celebration of Abbot Academy.
