= Salvador Gómez-Colón =

Puerto Rican author

Salvador Gabriel Gómez-Colón
- Born: 2002 (age 23–24); San Juan, Puerto Rico
- Education: Saint John's School; Phillips Academy; Yale University
- Occupation: Author
- Known for: Founding Light and Hope for Puerto Rico
- Notable work: Hurricane: My Story of Resilience
- Awards: Time's 30 Most Influential Teens of 2017; President's Environmental Youth Award; Diana Award (2019); Straubel Foundation Impact Leader Award
- Website: salvadorgomezcolon.com

Salvador Gabriel Gómez-Colón (Latin American Spanish: [salβaˈðoɾ ɣaˈβɾjel ˈɣomes koˈlon]; born 2002) is an author and advocate from Puerto Rico. In 2017, Gómez-Colón founded the humanitarian initiative Light and Hope for Puerto Rico in response to Hurricane Maria. He published the nonfiction book Hurricane: My Story of Resilience in 2021.

== Early life ==
Gómez-Colón was born in 2002. He was raised in San Juan, Puerto Rico, and attended Saint John's School until 2018 and left to Phillips Academy in Andover, Massachusetts. During his senior year, he served as one of the student body co-presidents.

== Career ==
=== Light and Hope for Puerto Rico ===
After the hurricane in September 2017, Gómez-Colón launched a crowd funding campaign called "Light and Hope for Puerto Rico." Starting in November 2017, he raised funds and delivered solar lamps and hand-operated washing machines to the affected communities through his campaign. The campaign raised over $170,000 and distributed 4,100 lamps to over 3,500 households across the island.

Gómez-Colón petitioned for R.C.S.455, which requires climate and resilience education for K–12 curriculums in Puerto Rico. The legislation was passed in 2024.

=== Davos 2020 ===
In January 2020, Gómez-Colón attended the annual meeting of World Economic Forum in Davos, Switzerland. He spoke along with Greta Thunberg, Natasha Mwansa, and Autumn Peltier on a panel named Forging a Sustainable Path to a Common Future. Gómez-Colón was named one of the inaugural teenage change-makers at the annual meeting.

=== Writing career ===
In 2021, Gómez-Colón published the memoir Hurricane: My Story of Resilience, about his efforts establishing Light and Hope for Puerto Rico. The book was one of the inaugural titles in W. W. Norton & Company's "I, Witness" series for young readers. The book received a starred review from School Library Journal, praising its accessibility, clear narrative, and sense of emotional urgency and immediacy.

The Mark Twain House and Museum hosted a discussion event with Gómez-Colón about the book in February 2025.

He has also published opinion editorials for various media, including Time magazine, The Independent, and CNN Business.

== In popular culture ==
Gómez-Colón is featured on Marvel's Hero Project, in the episode "Superior Salvador" of Season 1.

== Honors and awards ==
Gómez-Colón was named one of "The 30 Most Influential Teens of 2017" by Time magazine. In 2019, Gómez-Colón received the Diana Award for his humanitarian work.
