= Raymond A. Lamontagne =

- Born: November 14, 1934 (age 91); Manchester, New Hampshire
- Citizenship: United States
- Education: Phillips Academy
- Alma mater: Yale University (BA)

Raymond A. Lamontagne (b. November 14, 1934) is an American philanthropist. A former investment banker and president of Lano International Inc., Seavest Inc., and the Encore Company, Lamontagne has been a major financier and administrator of several prominent nonprofits. He participated in establishing the Peace Corps and later the Hole in the Wall Camp for seriously ill children, and worked with the Asia Society, the Japan Society, the Population Council, and the Agricultural Development Council. He has also served as chairman of the City Center 55th Street Theater Foundation, a performing arts venue in New York City, and as director of the Dyson Foundation.

== Early life ==
Raymond Lamontagne was born to David and Mabel Lamontagne in Manchester, New Hampshire, in 1934. His father, originally a professional boxer, had emigrated from Quebec at the age of twelve and spent his game winnings to start the Red Arrow restaurant in Manchester in 1922. The Red Arrow was known for offering quality food for a worker's budget. Raymond Lamontagne grew up working at the family restaurant.

== Education ==
Lamontagne attended Phillips Andover Academy, graduating in 1953. At Phillips Academy, he was highly engaged with school sports. He was a running back on the football team, he participated in the broad jump, and he occupied center field in baseball, winning a Coach's Award for the most valuable team player.

Lamontagne joined the Yale University class of 1957, and throughout his undergraduate career played baseball for the Elis. Upon his graduation, he turned down an offer to play for Major League Baseball when he received a Yale in China fellowship. With this grant he learned Mandarin at the Yale Far Eastern Language Institute, and taught at New Asia College in Kowloon, Hong Kong, from 1957 to 1959. Lamontagne's decision to opt out of the major league was featured in The New York Times, and drew the attention of Eleanor Roosevelt, the former First Lady of the United States. In summer 1957, Roosevelt invited Lamontagne to her home, Val-Kill, which is now part of the Eleanor Roosevelt National Historic Site.

In 1960 Lamontagne was admitted to Yale Law School. He took a leave of absence after his first year to help Sargent Shriver in Washington D.C. in founding the Peace Corps. He returned to Yale Law in 1964.

== Career ==
In 1959, Ray Lamontagne served as director of Phillips Andover Academy's capital campaign The Andover Program. In summer 1960, he worked as a group leader for Crossroads Africa, taking students to build a school outside Libreville, Gabon. In 1961-63 Lamontagne helped Sargent Shriver to launch the Peace Corps.

After graduating from Yale Law School, Lamontagne gained employment as an associate of John D. Rockefeller III in New York City through a connection to a former roommate, Rockefeller's son Jay Rockefeller. It was during this period that Lamontagne became involved with the nonprofits that Rockefeller had founded or chaired, such as the Asia Society, the Japan Society, the Population Council, and the Agricultural Development Council.

In 1968, Ray Lamontagne founded a private investment company called Lano International Inc. and acted as its president until 1983. He then worked as president of the investment companies Seavest, Inc. and the Encore Company until his retirement in 1999.

In 1987, Lamontagne aided actor Paul Newman's initiative to create the Hole in the Wall Camp for seriously ill children, by joining the board and pioneering its initial capital campaign. Lamontagne later served as Chairman of the Board, and became the first Chairman of the Association of Hole in the Wall Camps which promoted the development of similar camps globally.

Lamontagne chaired the City Center 55th Street Theater Foundation in New York City. He directed the Dyson Foundation, and has been a member of the Franklin and Eleanor Roosevelt Institute’s Board of Governors. He endowed the Ray Lamontagne prize in French North American Studies at Yale University, and was appointed as a Paul Newman Senior Fellow in Philanthropy at Marist University.

== Accolades ==
- 2007. Received the John D. Rockefeller Jr. Founder’s Award for a lifetime of philanthropic achievement by Historic Hudson Valley.
- 2009. Listed as a member of the undefeated Andover Football Team of 1953 when it won a place in the Andover Athletics Hall of Honor.
- 2011. Inducted into the Andover Athletics Hall of Honor
