= Thomas B. McCabe =

American business executive (1893–1982)

Thomas McCabe
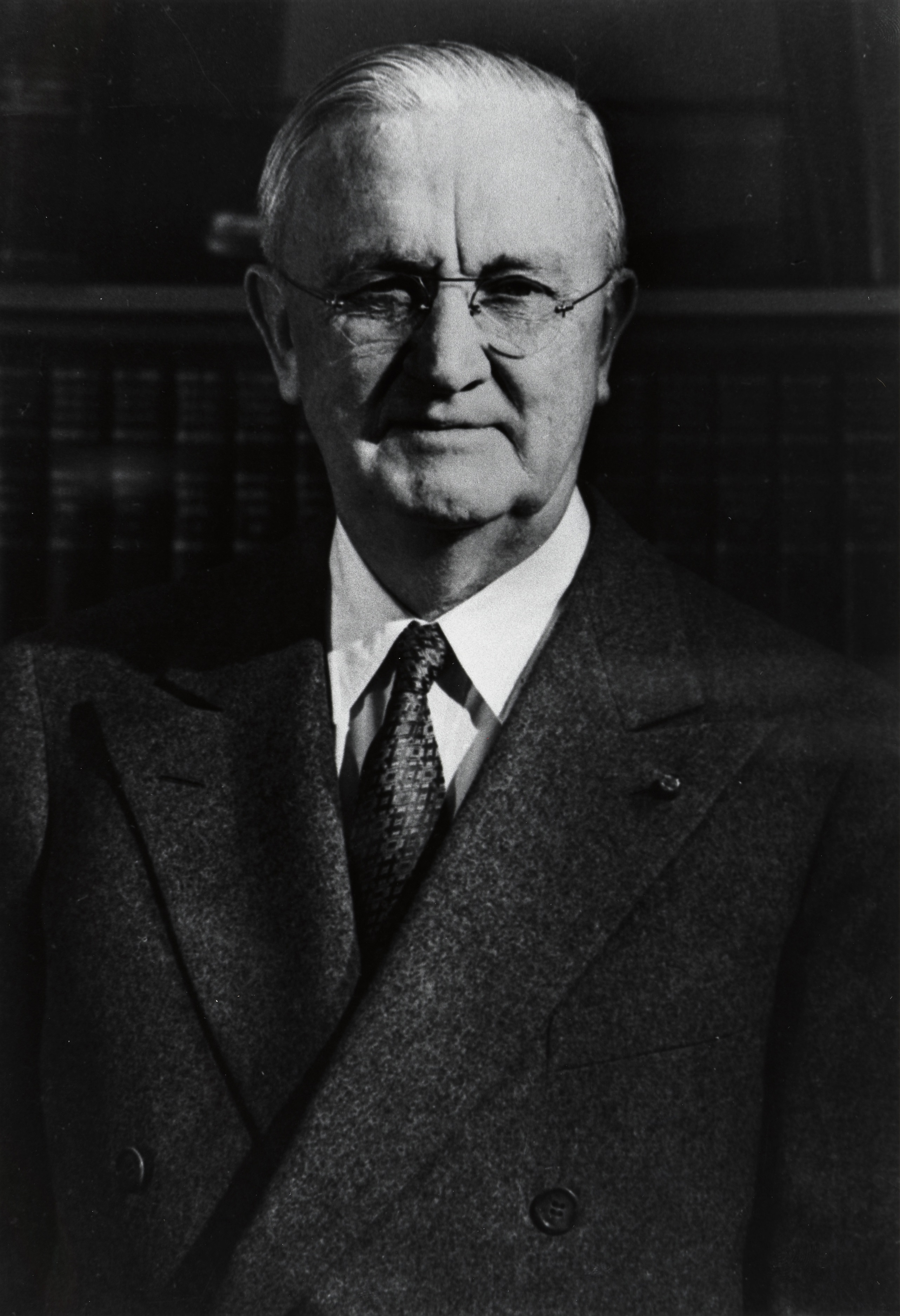

8th Chairman of the Federal Reserve
- In office April 15, 1948 – March 31, 1951
- President: Harry Truman
- Preceded by: Marriner S. Eccles
- Succeeded by: William McChesney Martin

Member of the Federal Reserve Board of Governors
- In office April 15, 1948 – March 31, 1951
- President: Harry S. Truman
- Preceded by: Ronald Ransom
- Succeeded by: William McChesney Martin

Personal details
- Born: Thomas Bayard McCabe; July 11, 1893 Whaleyville, Maryland, U.S.
- Died: May 27, 1982 (aged 88) Swarthmore, Pennsylvania, U.S.
- Party: Republican
- Spouse: Jeannette Everett Laws
- Relatives: Marcia McCabe (granddaughter)
- Education: Swarthmore College (BA)

Thomas Bayard McCabe (July 11, 1893 – May 27, 1982) was an American businessman who served as the 8th chairman of the Federal Reserve from 1948 to 1951. McCabe also served as president and CEO of Scott Paper Company for 39 years.

== Background ==
The youngest of five children, Thomas Bayard McCabe was born on July 11, 1893, to William Robbins McCabe and Beulah Whaley in Whaleyville, Maryland. According to family records, his paternal ancestors were early pioneers of Selbyville, Delaware, dating as far back as the late 1700s. By 1837, Thomas's great-great-great grandfather, Arthur McCabe, owned what was then all of Selbyville. His grandfather, William S. McCabe was involved in the local mercantile business for over 50 years.

When McCabe's father came of age, the firm William S. McCabe & Son was formed and became one of the leading business firms in Sussex County, Delaware. His father later founded and served as the first president of the Selbyville Bank as well as a banking and insurance commissioner for the State of Delaware in the early 20th century. He was an early advocate of the Federal Reserve System.

== Education ==
McCabe attended preparatory school at Wilmington Conference Academy (now called Wesley College) in Dover, Delaware, from 1907 to 1910. Following graduation from WCA, he entered Swarthmore College, where he studied economics, graduating in 1915 with an associate bachelor's degree. While attending Swarthmore, he joined the fraternity Delta Upsilon, as well as the Book & Key secret society. In addition, he held honorary doctoral degrees from 15 colleges and universities

== Scott Paper Company ==
In 1916 McCabe joined Scott Paper as a $15-a-week salesman when he was 23 years old. Scott Paper was then a small one-mill paper company. In 1917, McCabe left Scott temporarily to serve in World War I. He enlisted as a private and advanced to captain by 1919. McCabe returned to civilian life and to the Scott Paper Company at the age of 26. He advanced rapidly, moving up from assistant sales manager to become the president and CEO by age 34. By the late 1940s, McCabe was described as having shown "an advanced and enlightened policy that made the company a recognized standard for modern manufacturing and sales operations". He introduced music into the mill during working hours, stock purchase plans; insurance, hospitalization, recreation, and retirement plans, at a time when benefits such as those were relatively new for American workers. McCabe transformed Scott Paper from a 500-person paper mill company in Chester, Pennsylvania, into a multinational concern with over 60 manufacturing plants throughout the world employing over 40,000 people. By the time he retired from the company's board in 1980, Scott Paper had become a $2 billion operation.

== Federal Reserve and government service ==
In 1937, McCabe joined the Federal Reserve Bank of Philadelphia as a class C director, followed by his appointment as chairman of that Reserve Bank’s board of directors in 1939. During his tenure the institution took an increasingly active role in local affairs as part of the national system. McCabe leaned toward decentralization and away from the highly centralized philosophy that marked the federal government during the previous 15 years. His philosophy was in a strong local government. He felt that without healthy local business units there could be no overall national strength. McCabe called for cooperation between management, labor, and government as it means to combat inflation. He urged a cut in the federal debt as a step that should precede tax reduction, and he leaned toward a policy of credit contraction and saving as primary means of curtailing the inflation spiral. He was intensely interested in extending aid to foreign nations, being administered by one man who would report directly to the President. McCabe thought that the unification of American, British and French commands in Europe were necessary to rehabilitate Europe after World War II.

During World War II, McCabe took leave from Scott and worked for the Franklin D.Roosevelt administration. In 1941–42 he served as deputy administrator of the Lend-Lease program. During 1944–45 he served as deputy director of the division of priorities of the Office of Production Management also known as the War Production Board (WPB). He became commissioner of Army-Navy liquidation in 1945; and served as a member of the Department of Commerce’s Business Advisory Council. In 1946, he was awarded the Medal for Merit, the highest civilian honor at the time.

In 1948, two years after McCabe had returned to Scott, President Harry Truman appointed him to be the 8th Chairman of the Federal Reserve Board of Governors. He served from April 15, 1948 – March 31, 1951. McCabe took another leave of absence from Scott to serve in this position. As Fed chairman, McCabe supported a strong and independent Federal Reserve System.

When a dispute arose between the Federal Reserve and the US Treasury over interest rate policy and credit restraint in 1949–50, McCabe participated in the committee Truman created to hammer out a compromise. The agreement, known as the Treasury-Fed Accord, also known as the 1951 Accord was reached on March 3, 1951. His leadership was instrumental in establishing a firm opposition to the restrictive rate pegging policies that were being imposed on the Fed by the Treasury. The accord laid the foundations for the monetary policy the Fed pursues today. After resigning from the Board, McCabe returned to the private sector.

== Committee for Economic Development ==
In 1942 Thomas McCabe was a founding trustee of the Committee for Economic Development. A nonprofit, nonpartisan, business-led public policy organization still in existence today.

== Eisenhower Fellowships ==
In 1953, to celebrate President Dwight D. Eisenhower's 63rd birthday, his first since being elected to the presidency, a group of businessmen led by McCabe, founded an international leader exchange program to honor his devotion to world peace. They created a private, non-profit, non-partisan organization, governed by a board of trustees whose members included presidents of IBM, B.F. Goodrich, Chairman of G.E., a governor, U.S. Cabinet Secretary, U.S. delegate to the U.N. and 7 university or college presidents. Years later, Eisenhower described the program as "possibly the most splendid birthday present I have ever received."

== Scholarships, fellowships, and endowments ==
The McCabe Scholarships at Swarthmore College were established in 1952 by McCabe. The National McCabe Scholarship places emphasis on ability, character, personality, leadership, and service to school and community. The Regional McCabe Scholarship is merit-based scholarship. Every year, two Regional McCabe Scholars are selected each from the Delmarva Peninsula Chester County, Montgomery County, or Delaware County in Pennsylvania. The McCabe Engineering Award is presented each year to the outstanding engineering student in the senior class. A committee of the Engineering Department faculty chooses the recipient.

The Thomas B. McCabe Jr. and Yvonne Motley McCabe Memorial Fellowship is awarded annually to graduates of Swarthmore College, and provides a grant toward an initial year of study at Harvard Business School, University of Chicago, Massachusetts Institute of Technology, Northwestern University, University of Pennsylvania, or Stanford University. Special consideration is given to Fellowship applicants who demonstrate superior qualities of leadership.

The Thomas B. McCabe Lecture Series at Swarthmore College is an annual event that brings individuals with distinguished careers in varied fields to speak on campus.

The McCabe Library houses media items supporting the Humanities and Social Sciences, and facilitates access to a collection of over 500,000 ebooks, thousands of online journals, and a growing numbers of digital films. The Friends Historical Library and the Peace Collection, an acclaimed collection of rare materials and artist's books, can also be found there.

The McCabe Awards at the Perelman School of Medicine at the University of Pennsylvania were established in 1969 through a gift from Thomas B. McCabe and Jeannette E. Laws McCabe, to support junior faculty who initiate fresh and innovative biomedical and surgical research projects.

== Personal life ==
McCabe and Jeannette Everett Laws were married on March 1, 1924. Family records show that they had three sons: Thomas B. McCabe Jr (1926-1977), Richard Whaley McCabe (1932-2006), and James Laws McCabe (1943-).

McCabe also served as President of The Union League of Philadelphia in 1962.

== Notes ==
Government offices
Preceded by Ronald Ransom	Member of the Federal Reserve Board of Governors; 1948–1951	Succeeded by William McChesney Martin
Preceded by Marriner S. Eccles	Chairman of the Federal Reserve; 1948–1951	Succeeded by William McChesney Martin
