= Writopia Lab =

Writopia Lab is a non-profit creative writing program for kids and teens ages 4–18.

Founded in 2007 by journalist and educator Rebecca Wallace-Segall, Writopia integrates a student-centered methodology into the workshop, where each student sets individual own goals with the guidance of the instructor, and is encouraged to finish a full piece of writing by the end of the workshop period. Most Writopia students attend workshops at Writopia's main locations in Manhattan, Brooklyn, Westchester, Washington DC, Chicago, and Los Angeles. Workshops held at Writopia's main locations cost a fee on an honor-based sliding scale fee system. Writopia also runs free writing workshops offered throughout the New York Public Library, including the Edenwald branch, the 115th Street branch, the Throg's Neck Library, the Francis Martin branch, and Clason's Point Library. Writopia also runs writing workshops for children who reside at Homes for the Homeless "inns." In addition, Writopia runs free college essay workshops in partnership with Bryant Park and with the Office of The Mayor/NYC Service. Writopia Lab serves as a community partner to Scholastic Writing Awards in New York, and Writopia DC and Writopia Westchester serve as affiliates to the Scholastic Writing Awards in those areas, administering the local recognition programs and ceremonies. Notable authors of Writopia Lab's Advisory Council include Nicole Krauss, Susan Cain, Steve Young (writer), and Stephen Dubner.

== Worldwide Plays Festival ==
Writopia also runs the Worldwide Plays Festival each year, funded by David Letterman's production company, Worldwide Pants. This monthly festival culminates in a week of off-broadway showcases. Each play chosen for production throughout the year was written by a student and then produced, directed and performed by theatre professionals. The festival was initiated by playwright Daniel Kitrosser in 2010 and won financial support from Worldwide Pants in 2011. Worldwide Pants donated $50,000 in 2011, again in 2012, and $60,000 in 2013.

== External ==
- Organization's site
