= Peter Currie (businessman) =

American businessman

Peter L. S. Currie
- Born: 1956 (age 69–70)
- Education: Williams BA Econ/French; Stanford MBA 1982
- Occupation: Business executive

Peter L. S. Currie (born 1956) is an American business executive who was the chief financial officer for Netscape from 1995 to 1999. Currie has been described by Wall Street Journal reporter Jessica Vascellaro as one of the "Silicon Valley wise men". He was among the advisors to Facebook CEO Mark Zuckerberg about business matters in 2009. He is an investor in Internet start-ups and serves on the boards of numerous firms. He is president of Currie Capital and was a charter trustee of Phillips Academy; from July 2012 to June 2020, he served as the president of the school's board of trustees.

== Education and career ==
Currie graduated from Phillips Academy in Andover in 1974 and earned a B.A. degree from Williams College in 1978 and an M.B.A. degree from Stanford University. He worked in various capacities at Morgan Stanley including holding the title of Principal from 1982 to 1989. He held various management positions at McCaw Cellular from 1989 to 1995 before joining Netscape.

== Netscape rise and fall ==
Netscape was a key player that "fueled the Internet revolution," according to a report in "The New York Times," and Currie was an executive vice president who worked under its CEO James L. Barksdale and founder Marc Andreessen. Netscape developed the Secure Sockets Layer Protocol or SSL for securing online communication which is still widely used as well as JavaScript. Currie became its chief financial officer in 1995 when the company went public. He was Chief Administrative Officer at Netscape from July 1997 until March 1999. In addition to financial management, Currie was responsible for human resources, information technology, facilities, and operations departments.

Currie owned at least 37,500 shares of stock in Netscape which he sold in 1996, according to one report. Netscape was valued at $5 billion in November 1995. In 1999, Netscape was bought by America Online and became a holding company.

Netscape was seen as the first Internet superstar which had a meteoric rise but the firm was undone by numerous forces including well-established software firms such as Microsoft. In a conference in 2005, Currie described how "hectic and crazy things were" during the tumultuous years in the mid 1990s.

== Other ventures ==
In 1999, Currie and Barksdale and others formed a venture capital firm called Barksdale Group to invest in business start-ups, and raised at least $180 million according to one report. As an investor and consultant, he focused on the enterprise software sector of the business. Currie invested in an Internet start-up called Flipboard in 2010. Currie claims affiliations with Corsair Communications, Critical Path, Inkling, Listen.com, Kodak Imaging Network, Kontiki, IPVALUE Management, Oracle America, Tellme Networks, Zantaz, InfoSpace.com, Clearwire, CNET, Safeco, and Palamon Capital Partners. He serves on the board of directors for oilfield services giant Schlumberger. In 2016, Twitter released Currie from its board.

Currie's advice was sought by Facebook co-founder and chief executive officer Mark Zuckerberg in 2010.
