= Saint John's School (San Juan) =

Private school in San Juan, Puerto Rico, US

- San Juan; Puerto Rico

Information
- Type: Private, College Preparatory, Nonsectarian
- Motto: Veritas est libertas (Truth is liberty)
- Established: 1915
- Mascot: Hurricane
- Website: www.sjspr.org

Saint John's School is a private coeducational school located in the Condado neighborhood of San Juan, Puerto Rico. It has students from pre-kindergarten to the 12th grade.

== Background ==
Saint John's School is a non-profit, college preparatory, nonsectarian, coeducational day school founded in 1915. The school has an enrollment of over 800 students from pre pre-kindergarten to grade twelve. Instruction is mostly in English with the exception of language courses. Technology in the classroom includes tablets, laptops and smart boards.

== Academics ==
=== Elementary School (Pre-Pre-Kinder through Grade 6) ===
Traditional subjects such as reading and writing, mathematics, social studies, and science are organized by themes. The Spanish language program begins in PPK. Spanish as a Second Language instruction also is offered. Students have a computer literacy program, a physical development program based on the concept of “wellness”, and an integrated arts program including art, music, and performing arts. Community service projects are integrated into the academic programs.

=== Secondary School (Grades 7 through 12) ===
For grades seven and eight, every student takes the core academic classes of English, math, social studies, science, and Spanish. Physical education classes meet daily. In addition, all students take a number of exploratory classes that include visual and performing arts, technology, writing workshop, and research. Algebra I is offered to all eighth graders with a simultaneous class in math enrichment for those who need extra support. Each grade does community service projects a few times a year.

Students in grades nine through twelve follow a college preparatory curriculum enriched by electives and advanced placement courses. Advanced placement courses are usually offered in English literature, Spanish literature, French language, biology, chemistry, physics, calculus, economics, psychology, human geography, United States history and European history. Elective courses usually offered include anatomy and physiology, contemporary communications, art, film analysis, French, Hispanic culture, French culture and journalism.

=== AP courses offered ===
==== Humanities ====
AP Human Geography, AP Language and Composition, AP Psychology, AP European History, AP United States History, AP Government and Politics

==== STEM ====
AP Physics I, AP Physics II, AP Chemistry, AP Biology, AP Computer Science A, AP Computer Science Principles, AP Statistics, AP Calculus AB, AP Calculus BC

=== Advanced non-AP courses ===
Multivariable Calculus (taken by only one person in 2015)

== Facilities ==
Saint John's includes an elementary school complex with specialized areas for art, music, performing arts, computers and science, and a secondary building which contains science laboratories and a technology center. The library facilities include separate areas for elementary and secondary students. Each classroom is equipped with a computer and a monitor. All math and science classrooms are also equipped with projectors and a smart board. The school's gymnasium is used by all students. The school cafeteria serves breakfast, lunch, and snacks each day.

Administrative and Business Offices are housed in Casa Marbella. Admissions and Development Offices, as well as additional high school classrooms, can be found in The Annex.

== Extracurriculars activities ==
The school has a ham radio club and a school newspaper.

=== Athletics ===
Saint John's is an active member of the LAMEPI league at the elementary level and the PRHSAA at the middle and high school level. Mini, Juvenile, Junior Varsity and Varsity teams usually include girls’ and boys’ cross country, soccer, volleyball, basketball, swimming, tennis, and indoor soccer. Sailing is offered to students from grades five through eight as an exploratory program.

As part of the intramural program, there is a volleyball and basketball infantile league which includes first through fourth grade girls’ and boys’.
