= South Carolina Heart Gallery =

The Heart Gallery is a photographic exhibit of children in foster care who are awaiting adoption. Photographers across the United States donate their services. Display of the photographs online and in public venues raises awareness of the need for foster care adoption. The Heart Gallery began in New Mexico in 2001 and has since grown nationwide.

Established in 2005, the South Carolina Heart Gallery is a collaborative program administered and supported by the Children’s Foster Care Review Board – Office of the Governor and the South Carolina Department of Social Services.
