= Lucy Danziger =

American writer

Lucy Danziger is an American magazine editor and health writer.

She is the former editor-in-chief of Self magazine and was the Editorial Director of The Beet, a plant-based lifestyle guide website. She has launched digital media businesses and consults on content strategy for media companies and brands. She is currently a realtor with Old Purchase Properties in Bellport, NY.

== Background and career ==
=== Education ===
Danziger graduated from Phillips Academy in Andover, Massachusetts in 1978 and earned a Bachelor of Science in Art History from Radcliffe College in 1982.

=== Journalism ===
She worked as a general assignment reporter at the Star-Ledger of Newark for four years, covering everything from crime to court trials, business stories and local City Desk stories. She then became an associate editor at New York magazine and later worked at 7 Days, a New York-based weekly, as the founding Managing Editor. Additionally, she served as the founding editor-in-chief of Women's Sports & Fitness from 1997 to 2000 and as an editor in the Style News Department at The New York Times before becoming editor-in-chief at Self in 2001. Danziger has written for various publications, including The New York Times, The Wall Street Journal, Vogue, Outside, Condé Nast Traveler, Skiing, Allure, Time and USA Today. She has also appeared on several television shows, including Today, The View and Good Morning America.

During her tenure at Self, the magazine attracted more than 12 million monthly users and readers combined. She helped develop the Self Challenge, a three-month fitness program.

=== Websites ===
In 2019, Danziger launched The Beet, a plant-based website aimed at encouraging people to eat more plants.

=== Books ===
In March 2010, Danziger published The Nine Rooms of Happiness: Loving Yourself, Finding Your Purpose, and Getting Over Life's Little Imperfections with Hachette Books. In March 2012, she published The Drop 10 Diet: Add to Your Plate to Lose the Weight with Random House.

== Controversies ==
=== Image Retouching Controversy ===
In 2009, Danziger approved a retouched cover photograph of singer Kelly Clarkson for the September issue of Self, slimming Clarkson's figure. Facing public backlash against retouching, Danziger defended in her blog, stating that it is common practice for glossy magazines to retouch cover images. She wrote, "This is a collaboration. It's not a news photograph… Did we alter her appearance? Only to make her look her personal best. Did we publish an act of fiction? No. Not unless you think all magazine photos are that. But in the sense that Kelly is the picture of confidence-and she truly is-then I think this photo is the truest we have ever put on the newsstand."

=== Tutu Controversy ===
The April 2014 edition of Self contained a back page called the "BS Meter," which criticized false claims, including one by a tutus maker claiming that his tutus made runners faster. The photo editor illustrated the item with a picture of San Diego runner Monika Allen in a tutu. The magazine had contacted Allen to request permission to use her photo; they had not disclosed the context. Allen, a cancer survivor who sold tutus for charity, responded to the photo by contacting her local NBC affiliate, which resulted in significant backlash against Self and Danziger. Shortly after the incident, Condé Nast replaced Danziger with Cosmopolitan executive editor Joyce Chang, effective May 1, 2014.
