= WPAA (Massachusetts) =

Andover, Massachusetts; United States
- Broadcast area: Merrimack Valley
- Frequency: 91.7 MHz
- Branding: Phillips Academy Radio

Ownership
- Owner: Phillips Academy; (Trustees of Phillips Academy)

History
- First air date: May 1, 1965
- Last air date: 2003 (Note: The station had been off the air for over a year at the time its license was deleted in November 2004; WPAA has intermittently operated as an Internet radio station since then, but was dormant from 2019 to 2022.)
- Call sign meaning: "Phillips Academy Andover"

Technical information
- Licensing authority: Federal Communications Commission
- Facility ID: 68237
- Class: A
- ERP: 25 watts
- HAAT: 64 meters (210 ft)
- Transmitter coordinates: 42°38′53.17″N 71°07′49.22″W

Links
- Public license information: Public file; LMS

WPAA was a radio station, broadcasting from the campus of Phillips Academy in Andover, Massachusetts. Founded using Phillips alum and then-NBC president Robert Sarnoff's gift of $15,000, the station was launched in 1965 by a host of famous personalities, including Bob Hope, Jack Lemmon, David Brinkley, Sammy Davis Jr., and Hugh Downs. The station's signal was powered by a 33 watt transmitter and reached over 104 square kilometers, which, at launch, had the potential to reach over 150,000 people.

Following the loss of Phillips Academy's station equipment and the general decline of radio, WPAA refocused resources as a music studio, offering recording opportunities for student performers and providing live sound equipment for nearly all campus events, including the station's "Battle of the Bands" every spring.

== History ==
WPAA was licensed on April 26, 1965; it signed on May 1. It was a 10-watt station on 91.7 FM broadcasting from Evans Hall. The station later increased its power to 25 watts in 1984.

The Federal Communications Commission (FCC) canceled WPAA's license in November 2004, as the station had been off the air for more than a year. The Andover public school system had attempted to take over operations several years prior. With the deletion of the FM license, the station went Internet-only at WPAA.com. Additionally, Evans Hall was demolished in 2004, and the station was relocated to the basement of Morse Hall.

The deletion of WPAA's license prompted two further changes. Commercial station WXRV relocated its city of license from Haverhill to Andover, becoming the first and only radio service for the town, and Newburyport's WNEF 91.7 altered its signal pattern to put more power toward Andover. Lowell's WUML 91.5 was built with a directional signal to protect WPAA, which still is used even though there is no longer an adjacent nearby station to protect.

A decrease in student attention to the organization saw a decline in activity throughout the late 2010s, ceasing entirely by the end of 2019. By 2022, however, the station has begun rebuilding its presence on the Phillips Academy campus, with a focus on the future of music after radio.
