= Self (magazine) =

American online magazine

- Former editors: Lucy Danziger
- Categories: Women, health
- Frequency: Monthly
- Publisher: Condé Nast
- Total circulation: 1,492,959 (December 2012)
- First issue: January 1979
- Final issue: February 2017 (print)
- Company: Advance Publications
- Country: United States
- Based in: New York City
- Language: English
- Website: www.self.com
- ISSN: 0149-0699

Self (stylized in all caps) was an American online magazine for women that specializes in health, beauty, and style. Part of Condé Nast, its print edition had a circulation of 1,515,880 and a total audience of 5,282,000 readers, according to its corporate media kit in 2013. Self is based in the Condé Nast U.S. headquarters at 1 World Trade Center in New York, NY. In February 2017, the magazine became an online publication and ceased in April 2026.

== History ==
Self was founded in January 1979 by Phyllis Starr Wilson, who served as the editor-in-chief for the publication until January 1987, when she was named the founding editor. At its inception, the magazine began with many of the same philosophies it retains today, including health, fitness, nutrition, beauty and happiness, although the categories then were not as specifically named in the magazine. In her opening remarks in the first issue, Wilson wrote the following to the readers:

An extraordinary spirit and energy are emerging in women today. Fitness is the fuel. We have acquired a strong appetite for the full experience of life—the exhilaration of the outdoors, the challenge and success of professional work, the honest enjoyment of sex. Self will be a guide to the vitality we need to do all the things we want to do.

In 1979, cost of the magazine was $1.50 an issue or $10 for a one-year subscription. By 1983, the circulation for Self reached one million readers with its September issue. However, by 1986, the news-stand sales were stagnant. This may have been because other mainstream women’s magazines also began adding sections about health and fitness, so Self needed to redefine itself on the market. In January 1987, when Wilson became the founding editor, Valorie (Victoria) Griffith Weaver took over as editor-in-chief, but resigned within a year.

In July 1988, Anthea Disney took the position of editor-in-chief and made it her goal to refresh the magazine’s image. In the one year she held that position, she reworked the content by seeking out renowned authors such as Ann Hood, Susan Allen Toth, Alice Adams, Helen Mohr and Elizabeth Benedict to supply the magazine with fresher content with a higher degree of journalistic integrity. She revised their cover strategy by replacing airbrushed models with more natural-looking pictures of women in everyday surroundings. It was also at this time when the colors of teal and magenta were adopted for the magazine. Disney said in a New York Times article: "We deliberately chose colors not being used on other magazines". Between 1986 and 1989, the newsstand sales increased by 3 percent and the subscriptions increased by 22 percent.

Self was nominated in 2008 for a National Magazine Award (ASME) in the "personal service online" category for their annual Self Challenge, an interactive three-month weight-loss program that allows readers to log their workouts and watch videos, record their meals using an online nutrition diary, share recipes and tips, and communicate with the online community as they track their progress.

In the April 2014 edition (released in March), Self published a story mocking marathon runners wearing tutus. The runner in the associated picture was in fact a brain cancer survivor and was running for charity. After news of the offense spread online, the magazine made an apology.

In December 2016, it was announced Self would become online-only after their February 2017 issue was published. In April 2026, the magazine ceased, with coverage focused on women's health folded into Allure and Glamour.

== Editors-in-chief ==
- Rachel Wilkerson Miller (May 2022 - present)
- Leta Shy (May 2021 - May 2022)
- Carolyn Kylstra (December 1, 2016 - May 2021)
- Joyce Chang (May 1, 2014 – December 1, 2016)
- Lucy Danziger (June 2001 – April 2014)
- Cynthia (Cindi) Leive (August 1999 – May 2001)
- Rochelle Udell (September 1995 – June 1999)
- Alexandra Penney (August 1989 – September 1995)
- Anthea Disney (July 1988 – August 1989)
- Valorie Griffith Weaver (January 1987 – April 1988)
- Phyllis Starr Wilson (1979 – January 1987)

Joyce Chang was named editor-in-chief of Self in April 2014. Previously, Chang served as executive editor of Cosmopolitan. Prior to that, she was executive editor at Marie Claire and has held editorial roles at People, People StyleWatch, Lucky, The New York Times Magazine, and Allure. She graduated from Columbia's School of Journalism.
