= Phillips Academy =

Private high school in Andover, Massachusetts, US

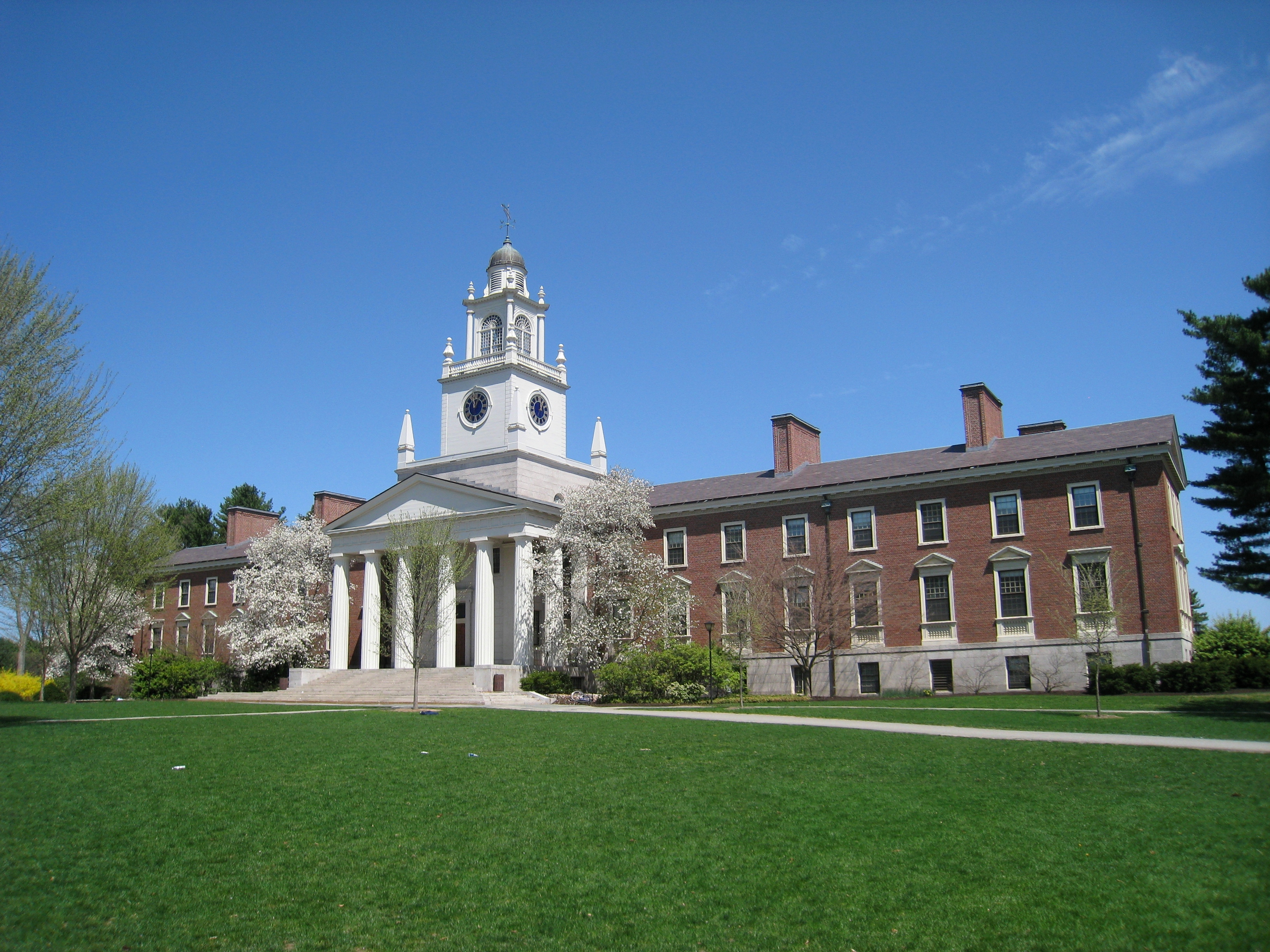
- Samuel Phillips Hall at Phillips Academy in 2008

Location
- 180 Main Street; Andover, Massachusetts 01810; United States; 42°38′50″N 71°07′54″W

Information
- School type: Private; Independent; College-preparatory; Day; Boarding
- Motto: Latin: Non Sibi ("Not for Self"); Latin: Finis Origine Pendet ("The End Depends Upon the Beginning"); Youth From Every Quarter; Knowledge and Goodness
- Religious affiliation: Nonsectarian
- Established: 1778; 248 years ago
- Founder: Samuel Phillips Jr.
- CEEB code: 220030
- NCES School ID: 00603199
- President: Amy Falls
- Head of School: Raynard S. Kington
- Teaching staff: 232
- Grades: 9–12, PG
- Gender: Co-educational
- Enrollment: 1,149 (2022-23)
  - Boarding students: 848
  - Day students: 282
- Student to teacher ratio: 7:1
- Campus size: 706 acres (3 km^{2})
- Campus type: Suburban
- Colors: Navy; White
- Athletics conference: NEPSAC
- Mascot: Gunga, the gorilla
- Team name: Big Blue
- Rival: Phillips Exeter Academy
- Accreditation: NEASC
- Newspaper: The Phillipian
- Yearbook: Pot Pourri
- Endowment: $1.67 billion (June 2026)
- School fees: Application fee: $60; International students application fee: $125
- Tuition: Boarding students: $79,800; Day students: $63,840
- Affiliations: ESA; TSAO
- Alumni: Old Phillipians
- Website: andover.edu

Phillips Academy, also known as Andover, is a private, co-educational, boarding-and-day, college-preparatory school located in Andover, Massachusetts, near Boston. It is the oldest incorporated academy in the United States, having been founded in 1778. The school enrolls approximately 1,150 students in grades 9 through 12, including postgraduate students. It is part of the Eight Schools Association and the Ten Schools Admission Organization.

Notable alumni include American presidents George H. W. Bush and George W. Bush, several members of the Washington family and Kennedy family, Oliver Wendell Holmes Sr., Josiah Quincy III, Philip K. Wrigley, A. Bartlett Giamatti, Benjamin Spock, Frank Stella, Bill Belichick, foreign heads of state, members of Congress, five Nobel laureates and six Medal of Honor recipients, and artists, athletes, and businesspersons.

Phillips Academy admits students on a need-blind basis and provides financial aid covering 100% of students' demonstrated financial need. 47% of Andover students receive financial aid, and 12% are on full scholarship.

== History ==
=== Revolutionary-era beginnings ===
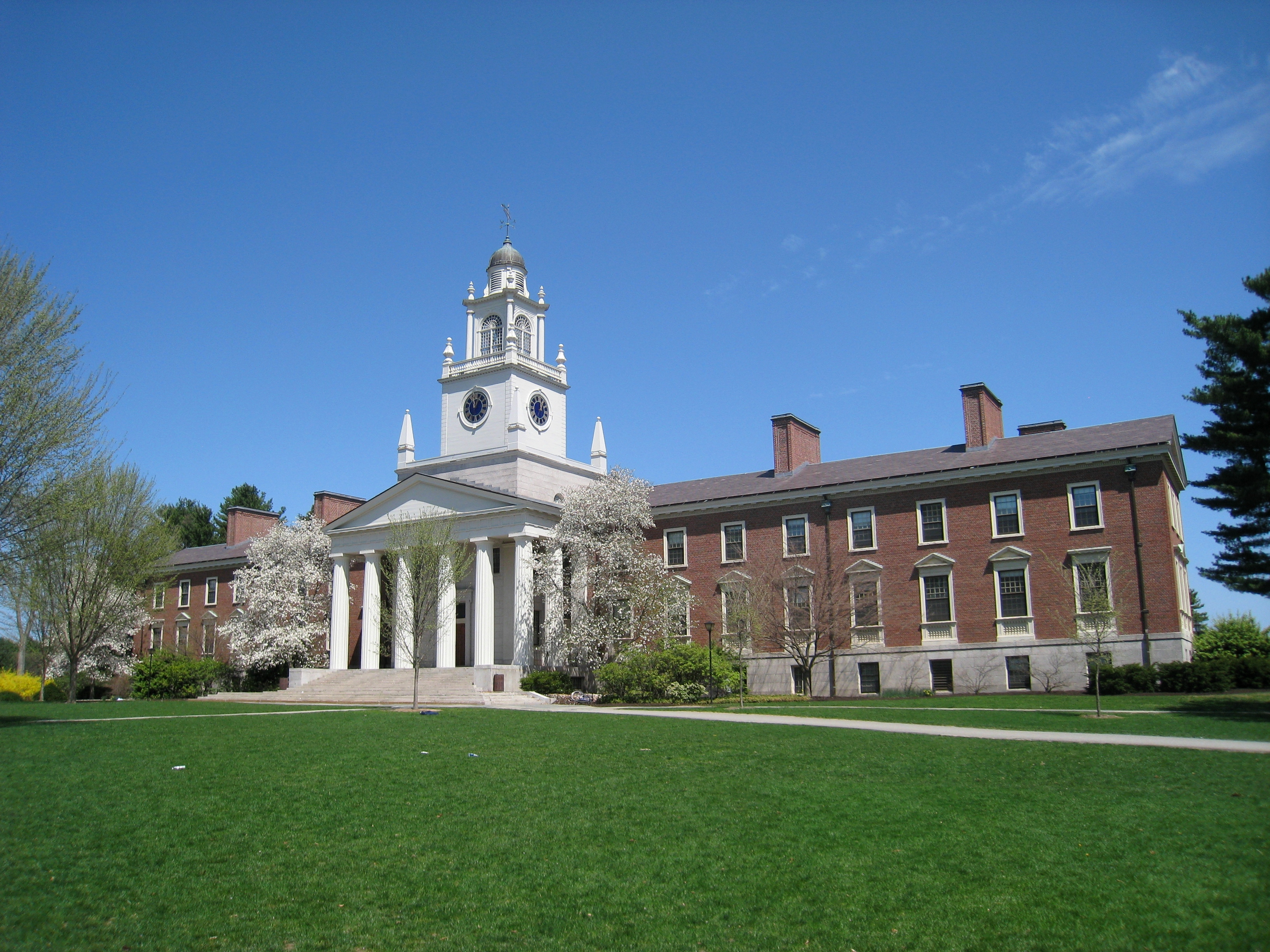
A view of Samuel Phillips Hall

Phillips Academy was established by Samuel Phillips Jr., a local businessman who hoped to educate Calvinist students for the ministry.

The American Revolutionary War had caused significant upheaval to education in New England, and Phillips Academy filled part of that gap. (For example, Boston Latin School shut down during the war because its headmaster John Lovell, a Loyalist, fled to British Canada after the fall of Boston in 1776.) The founders of Phillips Academy were strongly associated with the Patriot cause. Samuel Phillips and Eliphalet Pearson (later Andover's first head of school) manufactured gunpowder for the Continental Army, and the founders attempted to stock Andover's library with books confiscated from Loyalist families who had fled New England.

Several prominent Revolutionary figures maintained links with the academy, including George Washington (who personally visited the academy while president in 1789; eight of his nephews and grandnephews attended Andover), John Hancock (who signed the academy's articles of incorporation), and Paul Revere (who designed the academy seal). Revere's design of the academy seal incorporated a beehive, crops, the sun, and the academy's two mottos: Non Sibi ("not for oneself") and Finis Origine Pendet ("the end depends upon the beginning"). Other mottos include Youth from Every Quarter and Knowledge and Goodness, two paraphrases from the academy constitution.

In 1828, all-boys Phillips Academy was joined by a sister school, Abbot Academy. Abbot was one of the first secondary schools for girls in New England. Although the academies had neighboring campuses in the town of Andover, their administrations sought to limit and regulate contact between the student bodies. The two academies merged in 1973.

=== Andover Theological Seminary ===
From 1808 to 1907, Phillips Academy shared its campus with the Andover Theological Seminary, which was founded by orthodox Calvinists who had fled Harvard University after it appointed a liberal Unitarian theology professor. The Phillips family financially backed the seminary, and the two institutions shared a board of directors.

The Andover-Exeter rivalry developed after Samuel Phillips' uncle John Phillips founded Phillips Exeter Academy in 1781. The seminary's commitment to orthodox theology helped fuel the rivalry. Exeter was more welcoming to Unitarians, or at least less religious than Andover; as such, Exeter tended to send its students to Unitarian Harvard while Andover steered its students to Yale, more hospitable to Calvinists. The Phillips Academy constitution originally required all teachers and trustees to be Protestants, although the school has not enforced this restriction for many decades. Today, Andover and Exeter are both nonsectarian institutions.

Andover and Exeter's sports teams have meanwhile played each other since 1861, and the football teams have met nearly every year since 1878, making Andover-Exeter one of the nation's oldest high school football rivalries.

During the late 1800s, some New England families were drawn to Andover's reputation for theological conservatism. In the 1880s, the bulk of Andover students came from Congregationalist (mainly Calvinist) and Presbyterian households, and the academy enrolled "almost no" Unitarians or Methodists. However, by the 1900s, Calvinism was no longer popular in New England, and Andover Theological Seminary was facing declining enrollment. In 1907, the seminary reconciled with Harvard and returned to Cambridge.

=== Revival as college-preparatory institution ===
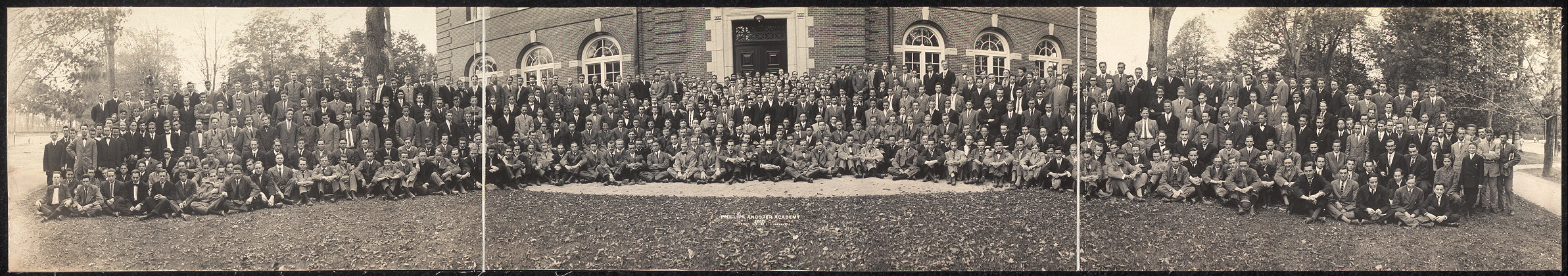
Student body, Phillips Andover, 1910

After a period of decline, Cecil Bancroft (h. 1873–1901), Alfred Stearns (h. 1903–33), and Claude Fuess (h. 1933–48) led Andover through a long era of expansion that transformed Andover into one of the largest and richest prep schools in the United States. Bancroft improved Andover's academic reputation; he reformed the curriculum to the expectations of college presidents and visited the English public schools to learn about best practices in Europe. Aided by a "sink-or-swim" policy of expelling underperforming or undisciplined students, the academy was able to place a majority of its students at Yale, Harvard, or Princeton (64% in 1931 and 74% in 1937). Enrollment, which had fallen from 396 students in 1855 to 177 in 1877, rebounded to roughly 400 by 1901 and passed 700 in 1937.

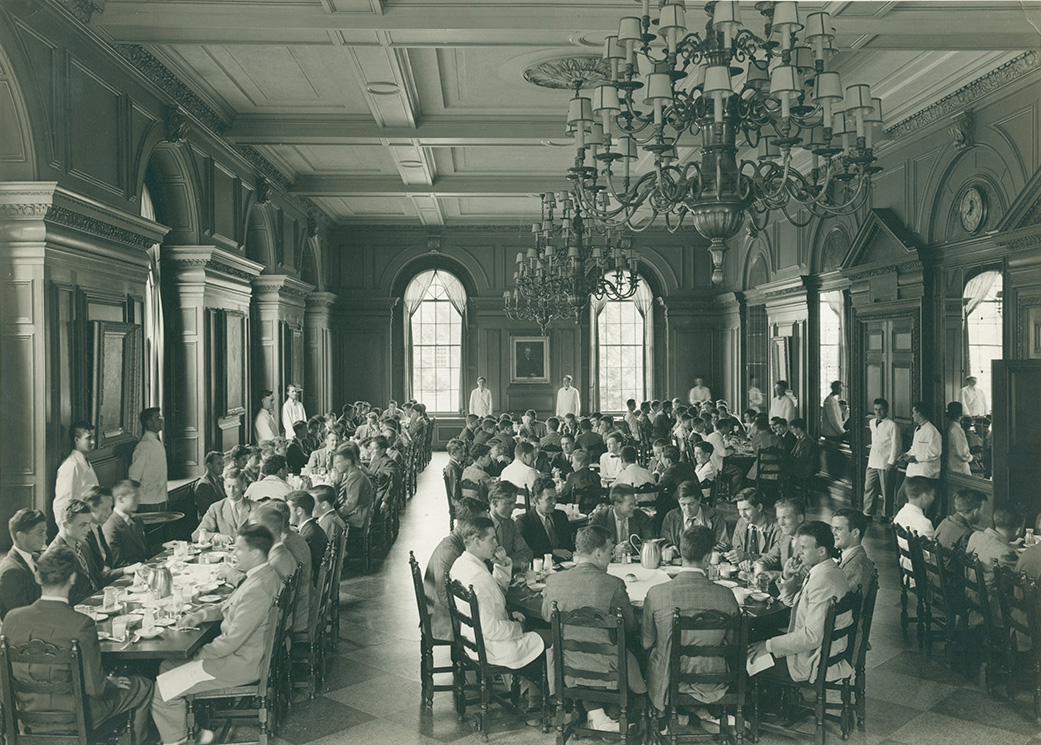
Paresky Commons in the 1930s

To compete with newer, fully residential boarding schools, the headmasters built new on-campus housing and modernized the academic facilities, a process that took over a generation to complete. Shortly after taking over, Bancroft recognized that Andover's historical reliance on local families for student housing was hurting its reputation. By 1901 Andover provided housing for approximately one-third of boarders; by 1929 all boarders could finally live on campus. Much of this expansion was funded by banker Thomas Cochran '90, a partner at J. P. Morgan who had no children and wanted to make Andover "the most beautiful school in America." Cochran donated roughly $10 million to Andover (approximately $181 million in February 2024 dollars); for reference, when he died his estate was probated at $3 million. In 1928, as many as 15,000 people visited Andover's campus to hear President Calvin Coolidge deliver the keynote address at Andover's 150th anniversary celebration, a speech that Cochran had arranged.

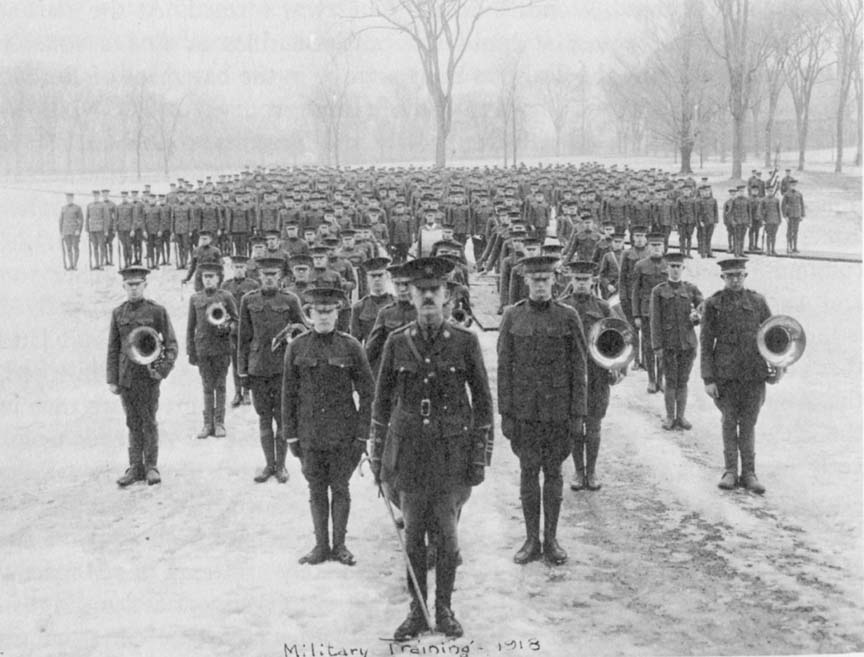
Andover Battalion cadets training at the school in 1918.

During this period, Andover was a primarily white and Protestant institution, although its expanding scholarship program and occasional steps toward racial integration made it relatively diverse by New England boarding school standards. The share of scholarship boys steadily increased from 10% in 1901 to roughly 25% in 1944. Andover was one of the first New England boarding schools to accept black students, starting in the 1850s. However, it had just five black students when Bancroft died in 1901, and black representation actually declined under Bancroft's successors: only four African-Americans attended Andover between 1911 and 1934. The academy admitted more Jewish students but capped their numbers at roughly 5% of the student body. Andover was also one of the first American schools to educate Chinese students, participating in the 1872–1881 Chinese Educational Mission; one student, Liang Cheng, later became the Chinese ambassador to the United States.

In the 1930s, Andover participated in the International Schoolboy Fellowship, a cultural exchange program between U.S. boarding schools, British public schools, and Nazi boarding schools. As U.S.-Germany relations deteriorated, Andover terminated the arrangement in 1939 at the State Department's request. Following America's entry into World War II, over 3,000 Andover graduates participated in the war effort in some capacity, with 142 deaths.

=== Post-war to present ===
John Kemper (h. 1948–71) updated the curriculum and improved salaries and benefits for faculty members. Under his leadership, Andover co-authored a study on high school students' preparation for college coursework, which led to the creation of the Advanced Placement program. Although tightening academic standards at elite universities and increased competition from public schools caused Andover's college placement record to decline significantly during Kemper's administration—the proportion of graduates attending Yale, Harvard, or Princeton fell to 55% in 1953 and 33% in 1967—nearly every major boarding school endured similar declines during this period.

Like many other boarding school administrators, Kemper and his successors also sought to democratize the campus. Andover began to admit more black students in the 1950s and 1960s, but progress was slow; by 1978, 6% of the student body was black or Hispanic. Andover abolished secret societies in 1949, although one society still exists. It also abolished mandatory attendance at religious services in the early 1970s. Phillips Academy became co-educational in 1973, when it merged with its sister school Abbot Academy.

During this period, Andover also began coordinating policy with other large and wealthy secondary schools. In 1952, the Ten Schools Admission Organization began coordinating outreach to potential applicants and streamlining the admissions process. After Kemper's retirement, Andover became a founding member of the Eight Schools Association, an informal group of headmasters of large boarding schools that began meeting in the 1970s and formalized in 2006.

Raynard S. Kington has been Head of School since 2019. He was previously the president of Grinnell College in Iowa. The previous Head of School was law professor (and 1990 Exeter graduate) John Palfrey, who left Andover to take over the MacArthur Foundation. The academy is supervised by a board of trustees, all of whom are alumni except the Head of School. It is accredited by the New England Association of Schools and Colleges.

On July 1, 2026 the school's trustees announced that alumnus Jim Ventre would take over as Head of School on July 1, 2027.

== Admissions and student body ==
=== Admission policies ===
Phillips Academy is one of the most selective boarding schools in the United States, especially in light of its size. In 2016, four boarding schools had an acceptance rate lower than 15%, and Andover was larger than the other three put together. The acceptance rate normally hovers around 13%, but during the COVID-19 pandemic, it fell to 9% in 2022.

Andover has practiced need-blind admission since 2007. It also offers financial aid that covers 100% of demonstrated financial need for every admitted student. To recruit U.S. students from "historically underrepresented" backgrounds, Andover pays for certain prospective financial aid applicants and their guardians to visit the campus during the admissions process.

About one of every eight Andover students (12.9%) has a parent who attended Andover, and at least one out of every five Andover students has a sibling who attended Andover.

=== Student body ===
Student body composition (2021–22)
Race and ethnicity	PA	Massachusetts
White	36.5%	69.6%
Asian	33.0%	7.7%
Black	10.2%	9.5%
Hispanic	10.5%	13.1%
Multiracial	9.3%	2.7%

Andover enrolls a student body that is more racially diverse than Massachusetts, although the numbers vary significantly depending on whether respondents are permitted to identify as two or more races. The academy reports that 59% of students identify as people of color.

For the 2021–2022 school year, Andover reported that 36.5% of its students were white, 33.0% were Asian, 10.2% were black, 10.5% were Hispanic, 0.5% were Native American/Alaska Native, and 9.3% were multiracial. The survey in question did not allow Andover to identify one student in multiple categories.

By contrast, a March 2023 survey conducted by Andover's student newspaper (to which 81.0% of the student body responded) found that 50.2% of Andover students identified as white, 42.9% as Asian (including 25.8% as Asian Americans), 13.4% as black (including 8.6% as African American), 10.9% as Hispanic or Latino, 1.4% as Native American/Alaska Native, and 1.3% as Native Hawaiian/Pacific Islander. This survey allowed students to identify with multiple categories. The percentage of black students represents a significant increase from 2021, when 10.4% of students identified as black and 6.8% as African American.

Andover enrolls a large international student population, representing approximately 15% of the student body. In March 2024, Andover enrolled 184 international students, of whom 55 were U.S. citizens living abroad. Conversely, a quarter of the student body lives off campus in neighboring communities.

The student body is relatively affluent and politically liberal. As of March 2023, 95.4% of Andover students have at least one parent who graduated from college, and 46.8% of students have family household incomes over $250,000/year, compared to the 11.3% of students with family household incomes under $100,000/year (another 22.9% do not know their family income). 38.8% of students identified as liberal, 13.3% as independent, 8.6% as conservative, and 8.0% as either communist or socialist (another 26.5% were unsure as to their political affiliation). 21.6% of students identified as agnostic and 21.1% as atheist, compared to 22.5% who identified as "Christian", 16.9% as Catholic, and 5.4% as Protestant (students could select multiple choices). In addition, 6.4% of students identified as ethnically Jewish and 5.3% as religiously Jewish.

== Academics ==
=== Curriculum ===
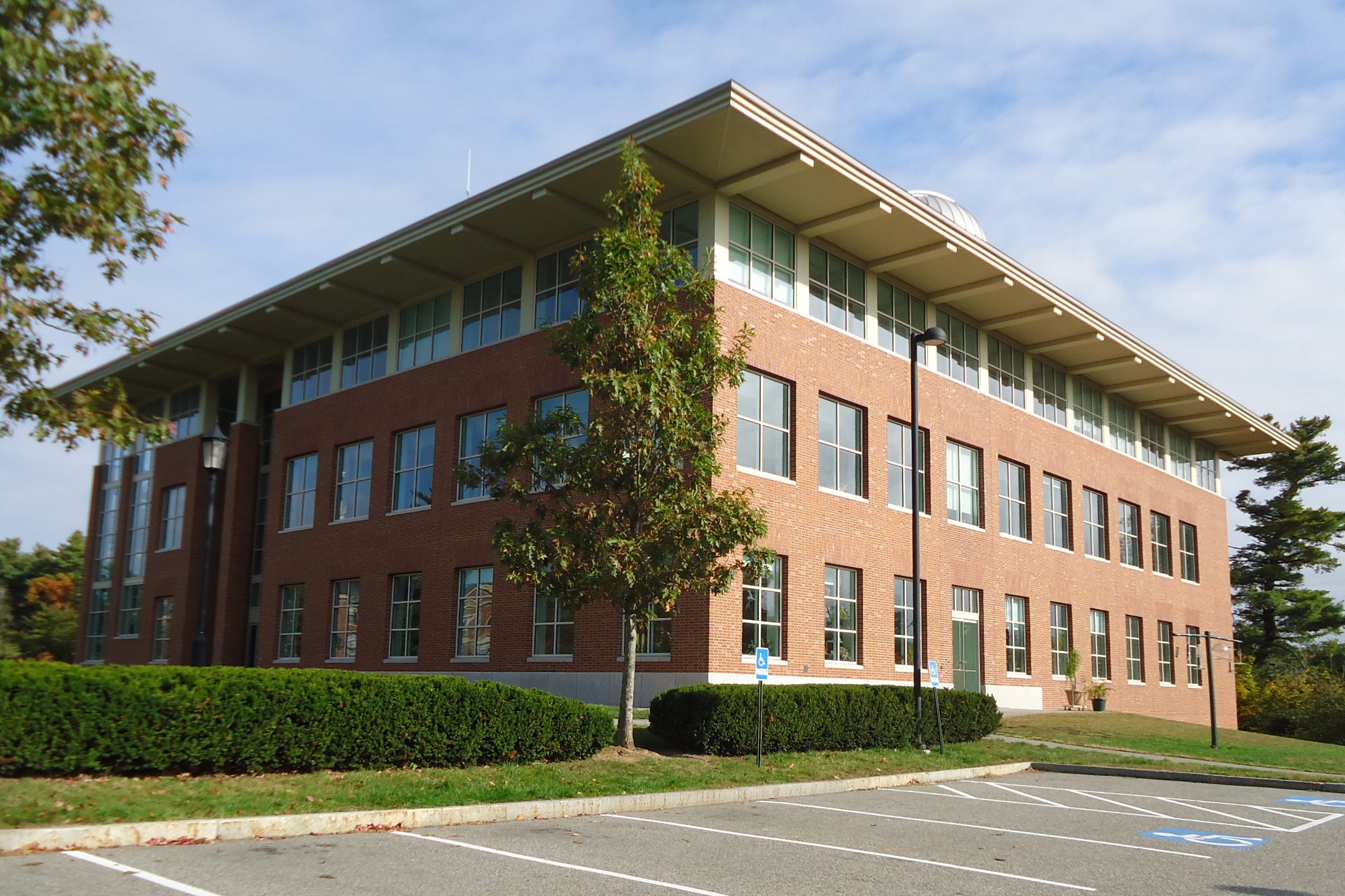
Gelb Science Center was opened in 2004.

Phillips Academy follows a trimester program, where a school year is divided into three terms lasting around ten weeks each. With 232 teaching faculty, a 7:1 student-faculty ratio, and an average class size of 13, Andover is able to offer 300 courses and a faculty-guided independent research option. Courses may last one, two, or three terms. Although Andover helped create the Advanced Placement program, the academy de-emphasized AP classes in the 21st century, citing a desire to maintain curricular flexibility and independence.

Andover does not rank students. It calculates GPA using a 6.0 scale instead of the usual 4.0 scale, where a 6 is considered outstanding, a 5 is an honors grade, and a 2 is a passing grade. A March 2023 student survey found that the average GPA was 5.41; it was 5.18 in 2018.

Andover also runs a five-week summer session for approximately 600 students entering grades 8-12, which dates back to 1942.

=== Test scores ===
Andover does not publicly report its students' standardized test scores, explaining that many colleges adopted test-optional admission policies during the COVID-19 pandemic. The Class of 2019's average combined SAT score was 1460 (720 reading, 740 math), and its average combined ACT score was 31.1.

=== Grade levels ===
In the 2022–23 school year, Andover enrolled 214 freshmen (in academy jargon, "juniors"), 276 sophomores ("lowers"), 311 juniors ("uppers"), and 348 seniors and postgraduates ("seniors" and "PGs"), for a total enrollment of 1,149 students.

== Facilities ==
- Academy Hill Historic District
- U.S. National Register of Historic Places
- U.S. Historic district
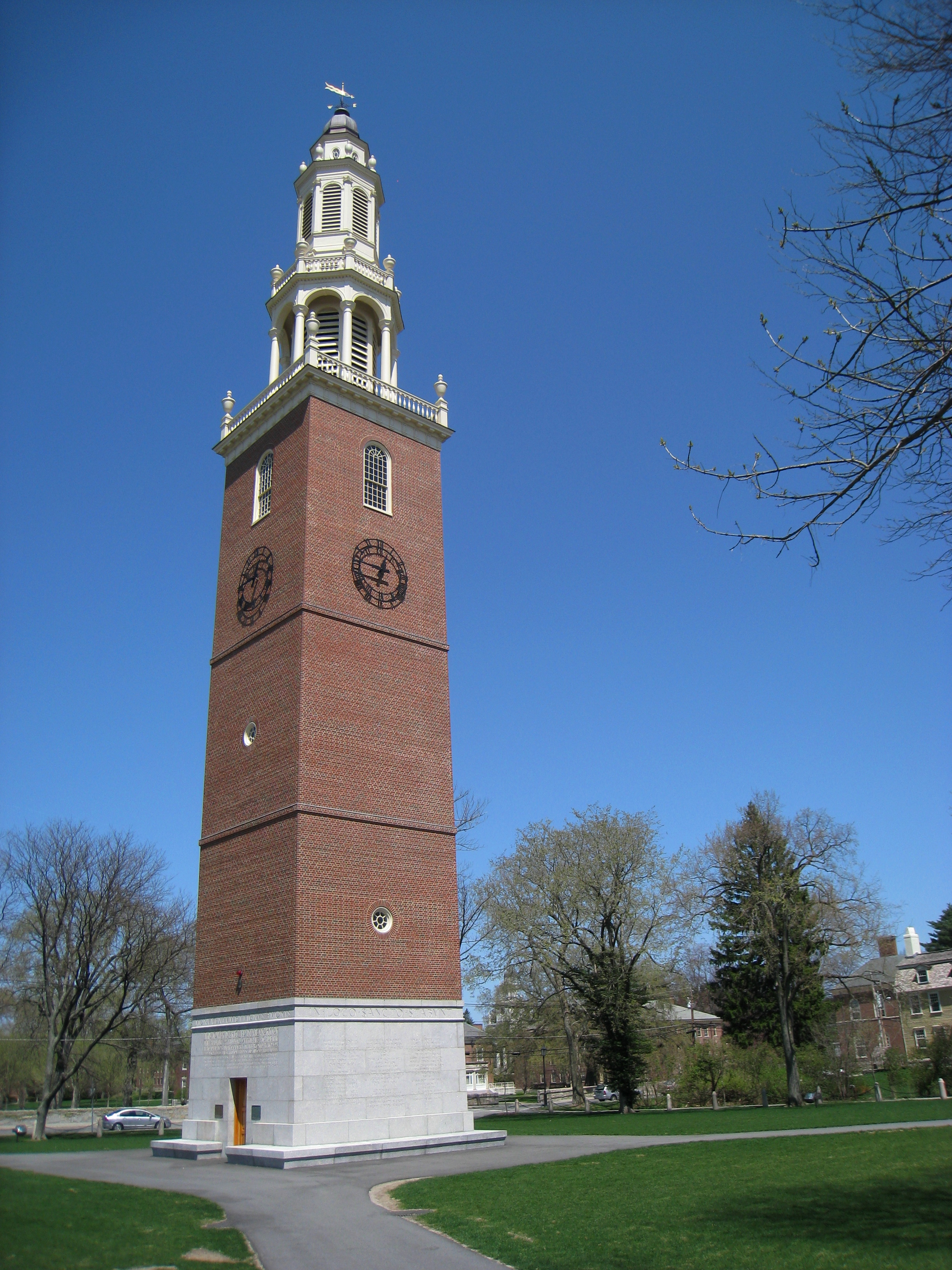
- Phillips Academy; Memorial Bell Tower
- Location: Andover, Massachusetts
- Built: 1780
- Architect: Multiple
- Architectural style: Mid 19th Century Revival, Other, Federal
- MPS: Town of Andover MRA
- NRHP reference No.: 82000475
- Added to NRHP: October 7, 1982

The Cycle of Life armillary sphere by Paul Manship

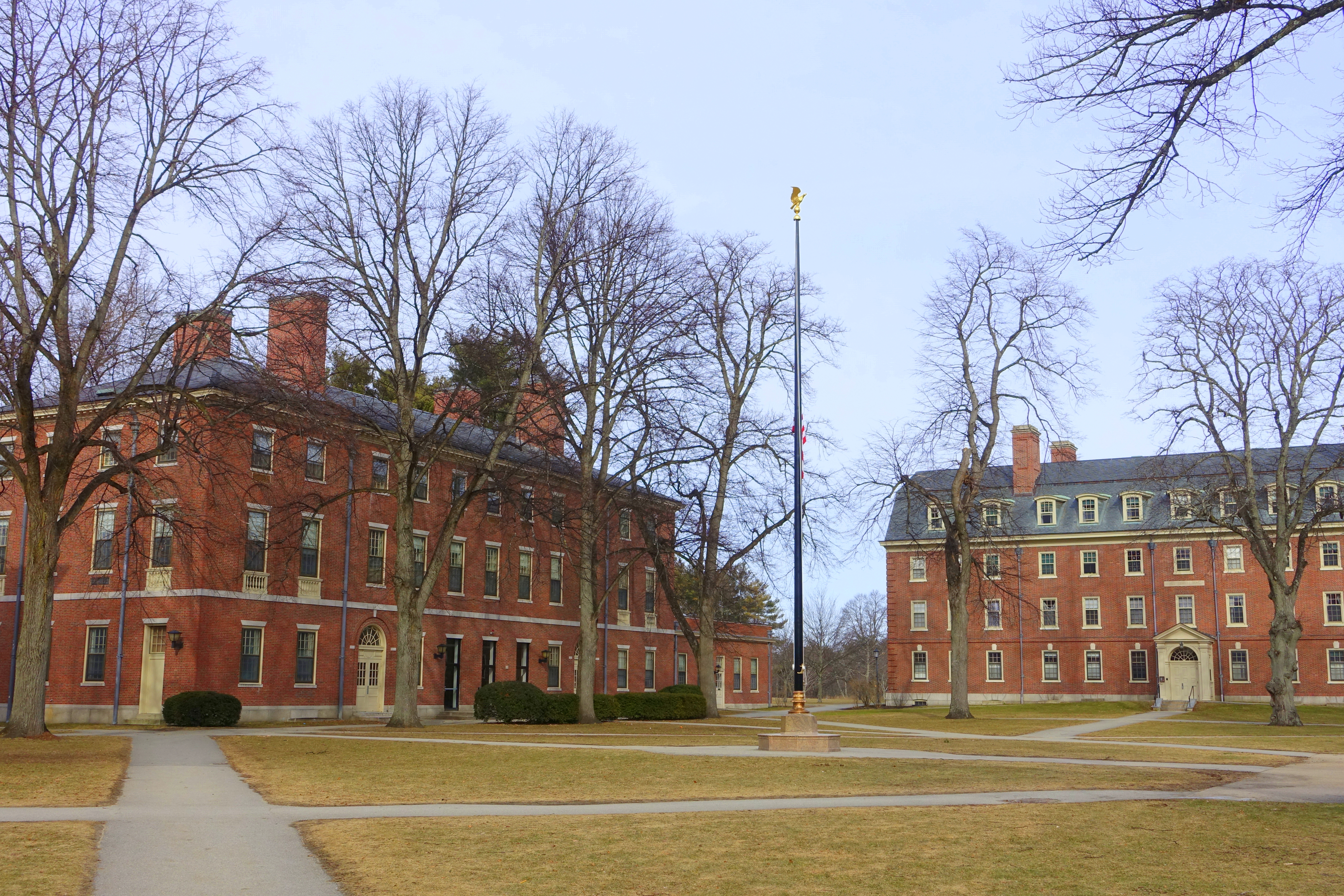
Andover's old campus core.

The old core of Phillips Academy's campus is listed on the National Register of Historic Places as part of the Academy Hill Historic District. It includes the historic campuses of Phillips Academy, Abbot Academy, and Andover Theological Seminary, the latter of which sold its buildings to Phillips Academy when it left Andover in 1907.

In the 1920s and 1930s, Andover added new buildings around this campus core, including the administrative building, library, dining hall, art gallery, chapel, math building, and dormitories. Many of the buildings were named after notable Americans, some (but not all) of whom attended Andover.

Portions of Andover's campus were laid out by Frederick Law Olmsted, (Note: Olmsted was an alumnus of the Andover English Academy & Teachers Seminary, a school established by PA donors on the PA campus to provide an alternative to PA's classics-focused college-preparatory curriculum. The school received little financial support from PA after its founding, but was ultimately merged into PA in some shape or form.) designer of Central Park. Beginning in 1891, Olmsted and his architectural firm advised Andover on campus design; this relationship would continue for the next five decades.

=== Notable academic facilities ===
- George Washington Hall hosts the school's administrative offices and the Drama and Art Departments. It also hosts the school post office, locker rooms, and Day Student Lounge. It was built in 1926.
- Bulfinch Hall hosts the English Department. It was built in 1819 and renovated in 2012. It was named after architect Charles Bulfinch, who taught the hall's architect Asher Benjamin.
- Pearson Hall hosts the Classics Department. It was built in 1817. It was formerly the chapel of Andover Theological Seminary.
- Morse Hall hosts the Math Department, the student radio station, some student publications, and the Community and Multicultural Development department. It was built in the 1920s/1930s. It was named after Samuel Morse '05, who invented the telegraph and Morse code.
- Gelb Science Center hosts the Science Department and an observatory. It was built in 2004. It was named after donor Richard L. Gelb '41, the heir to the Clairol hair care company.
- Oliver Wendell Holmes Library (OWHL) houses over 80,000 books and contains classroom space. It was built in 1929 and renovated in 1987 and 2019. It is named after Oliver Wendell Holmes Sr. '25, the poet and physician. Built in the Georgian Revival architectural style, it has been modernized over the years and now contains a silent study room and a makerspace.

=== Student facilities ===
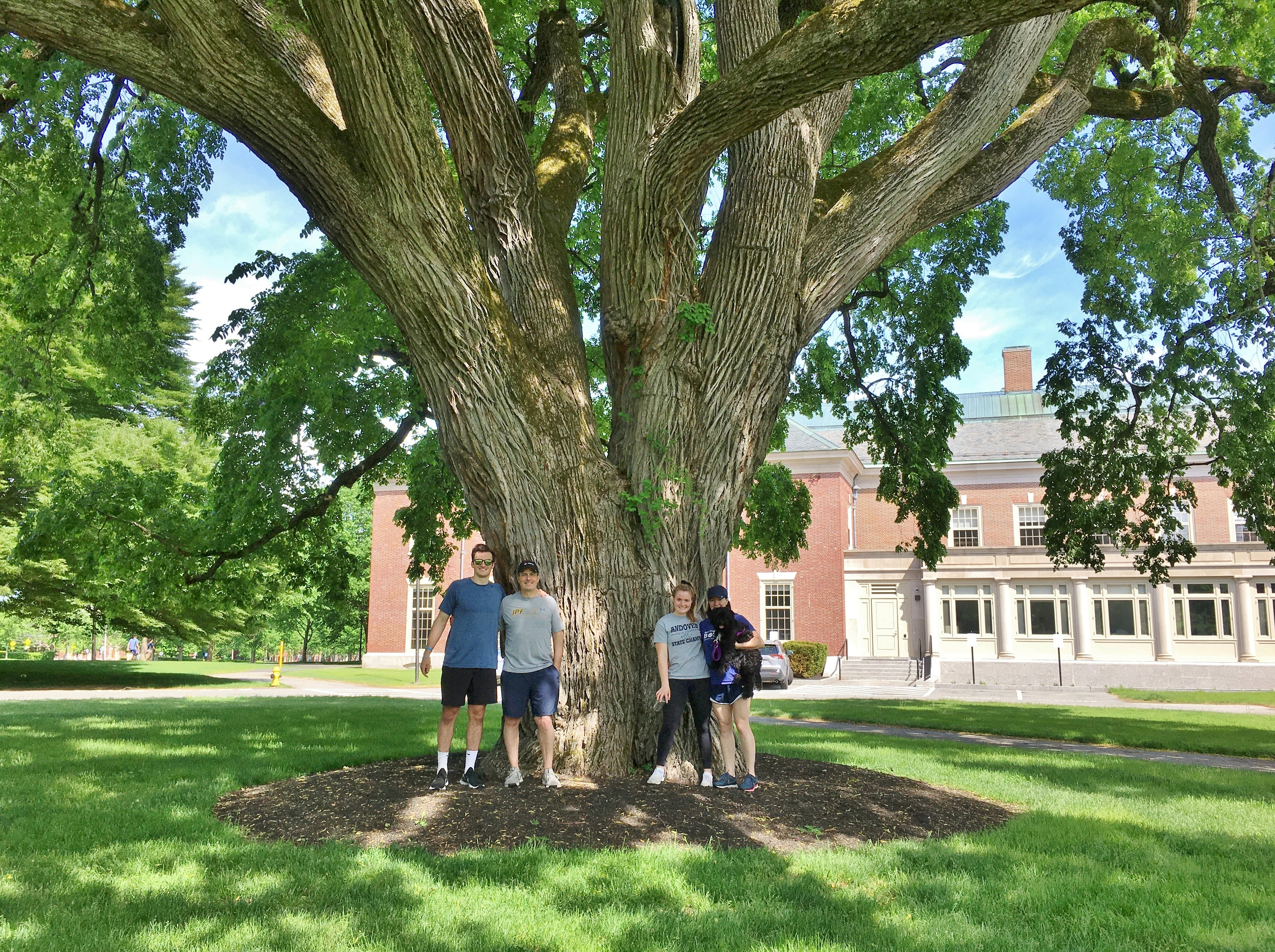
Visitors by the American elm in front of the library.

- Cochran Chapel hosts religious services and the philosophy, religious studies, and community service departments. It is the only building on campus named for the Cochran family, who built much of the modern-day Andover campus.
- Paresky Commons is the dining hall. Designed by Charles Platt in the Colonial Revival style, it opened in 1930 and was extensively renovated in 2007, after which it was renamed in honor of donor David Paresky '56. Commons earned LEED Silver certification in 2011. Since its opening, the individual grade levels have generally occupied their own sections of the dining hall.
- Cochran Wildlife Sanctuary covers 65 acres and contains the Log Cabin, a place for student groups to hold meetings and sleep-overs.
- Rebecca M. Sykes Wellness Center offers physical and mental health facilities.
- Andover has two athletic centers: the 98,000-square-foot Snyder Center and the 70,000-square-foot Pan Athletic Center.
- Falls Music Center, opened 2025, a 32,700 square foot music facility with stringent acoustical requirements met via low velocity HVAC air distribution and strategic use of displacement ventilation.

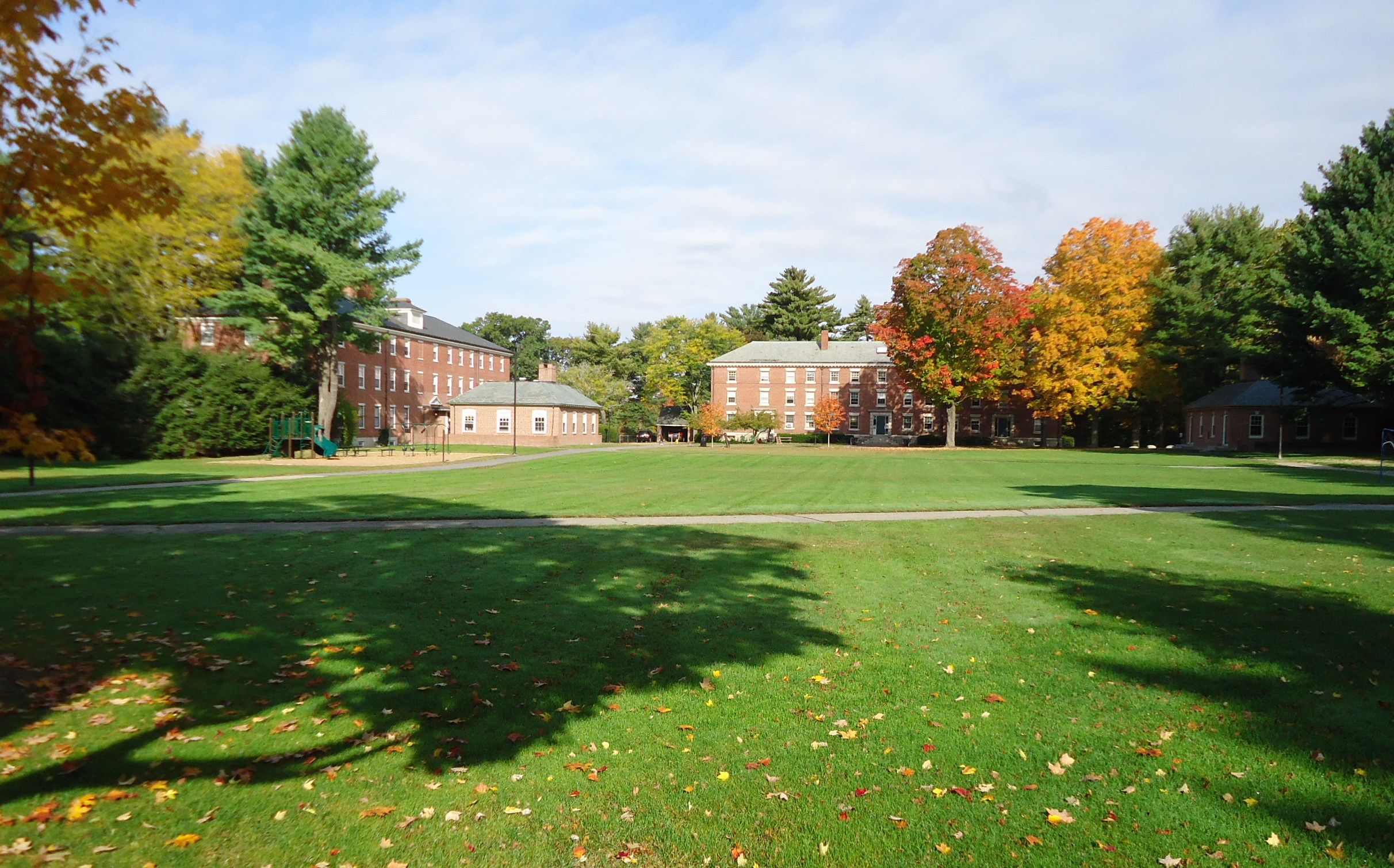
Western dormitory quadrangle ("West Quad").

The academy's dormitories vary in size from as few as four to as many as 40 students, and are organized into five "clusters" of roughly 220 students and 40 faculty affiliates each. Many social events are organized through the cluster system, including orientation, study breaks, and snacks. None of the original dormitory buildings remain; the oldest dorm is Blanchard House, built in 1789.

Two dormitory names carry on the Andover Theological Seminary tradition: America House, where the song America was penned by a seminarian, and Stowe House, the former residence of writer Harriet Beecher Stowe. Stowe's husband Calvin taught at the seminary from 1852 to 1864, and Stowe used her first royalty check from Uncle Tom's Cabin to renovate the building. The house was moved to its current location on Bartlet Street in 1929.

The academy also operates the Andover Inn, which has 30 guest rooms and various event spaces. Designed by Sidney Wagner, the three-story Georgian style building overlooks a pond. It was built in 1930 and was most recently renovated in 2023. It replaced another inn that had been operating on the same site since 1888.

== Museums ==
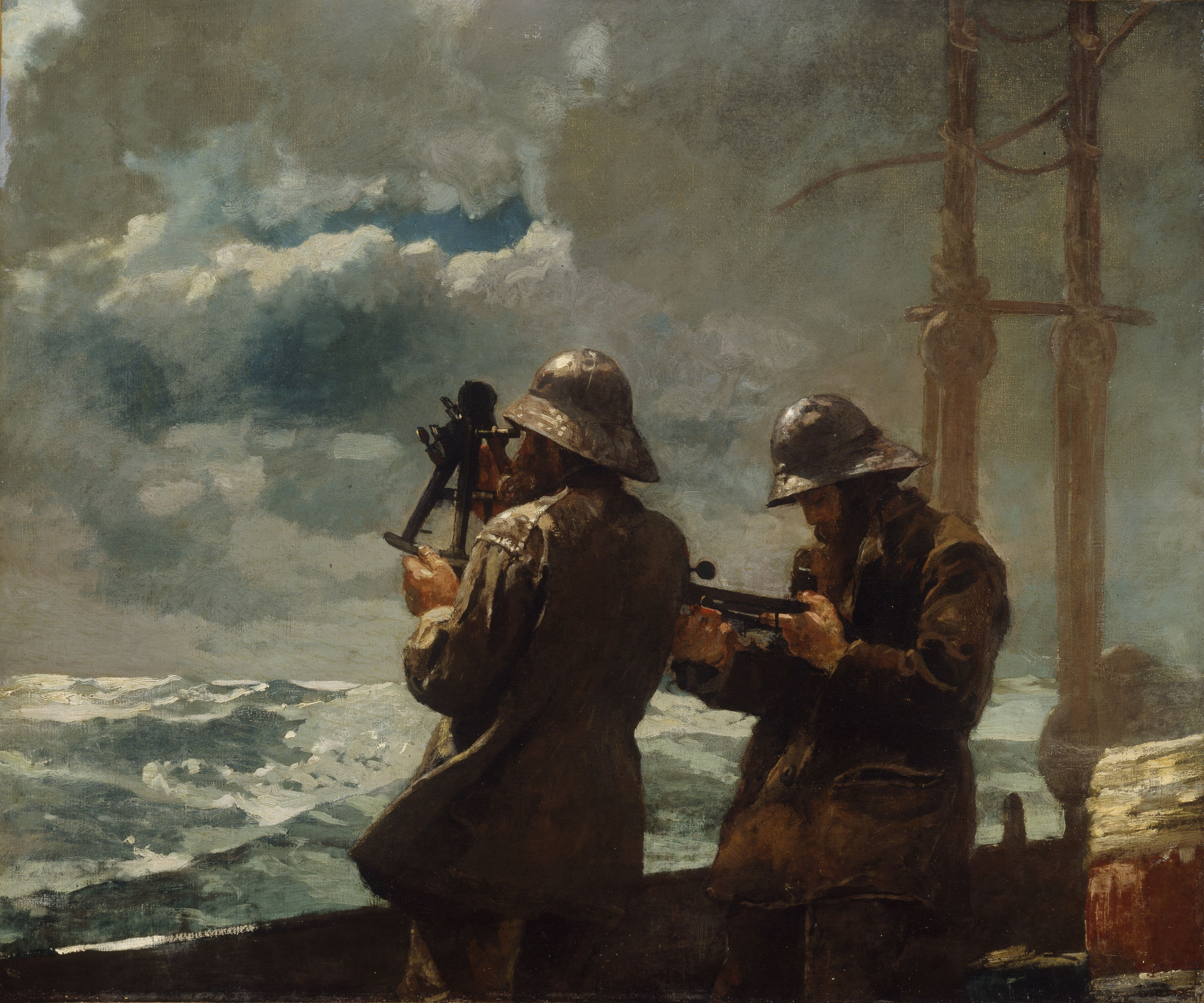
Winslow Homer's Eight Bells

The Addison Gallery of American Art is an art museum donated by Thomas Cochran in memory of Keturah Addison Cobb, the mother of his friend Zaidee Cobb Bliss. It is open to the public, and underwent a $30 million renovation and expansion from 2008 to 2010.

The gallery's permanent collection includes Winslow Homer's Eight Bells, along with work by John Singleton Copley, Benjamin West, Thomas Eakins, James McNeill Whistler, Frederic Remington, George Bellows, Edward Hopper, Georgia O'Keeffe, Jackson Pollock, Frank Stella, and Andrew Wyeth. The museum also features collections in American photography and decorative arts, with silver and furniture dating back to precolonial America and a collection of colonial model ships. The gallery also features rotating exhibitions.

The Robert S. Peabody Institute of Archaeology was founded in 1901. The academy bills it as "one of the nation's major repositories of Native American archaeological collections." Unlike the Addison Gallery, the Peabody Institute is accessible to researchers, public schools, and visitors only by appointment.

The collection includes materials from the Northeast, Southeast, Midwest, Southwest, Mexico and the Arctic, and range from Paleo Indian (more than 10,000 years ago) to the present day. Since the early 1990s, the museum has been at the forefront of compliance with the Native American Graves Protection and Repatriation Act.

== Extracurriculars ==
Phillips Academy's extracurricular activities include music ensembles, a campus newspaper, an Internet radio station (formerly broadcasting as WPAA), and a debate club.

Andover's weekly student newspaper, The Phillipian, has been publishing since 1857, making it the nation's first secondary school newspaper to be founded. According to the Phillipian website, the newspaper is "entirely uncensored and student run". The Philomathean Society, a parliamentary debate club, was founded in 1825.

Andover students operated the Phillips Academy Poll, the first public opinion poll to be conducted by high school students. In 2022, the poll was featured by Boston Channel 7 News and The New Yorker, among others, after releasing polling results for the 2022 midterm elections.

== Athletics ==
=== History ===
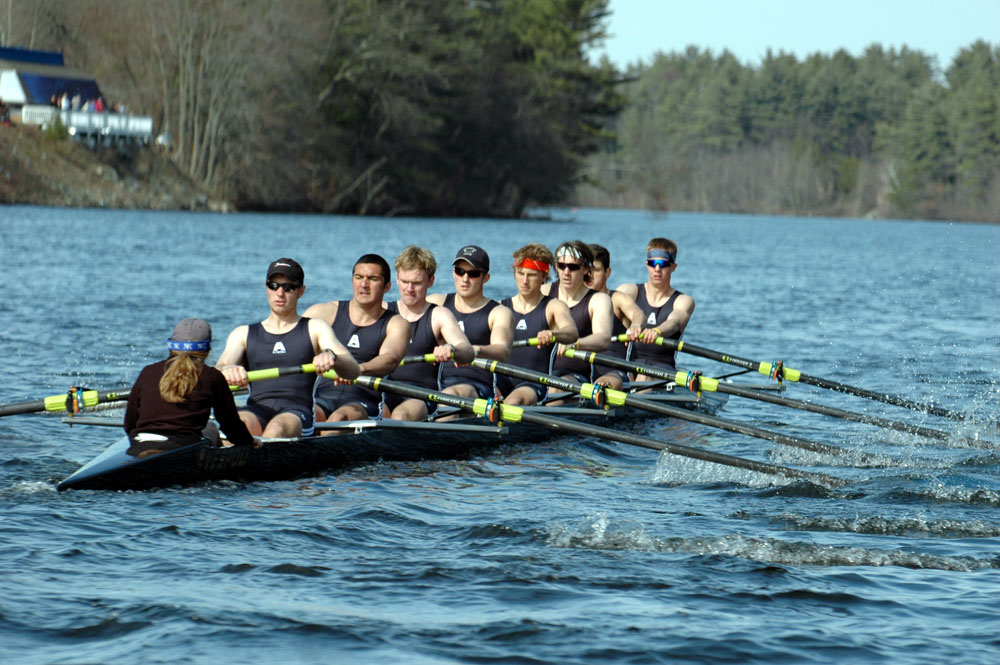
An Andover crew races on the Merrimack River.

Athletic competition has long been a part of the Phillips Academy tradition. As early as 1805, some form of "football" was being played on campus; that year, Eliphalet Pearson's son Henry wrote that "I cannot write a long letter as I am very tired after having played at football all this afternoon." (The first game of what is now known as American football was played in 1869, and resembled association football more than gridiron football.) Andover participated in the first-ever high school football game, playing Adams Academy in 1875. The school organized an athletics department in 1903 with the objective of "Athletics for All".

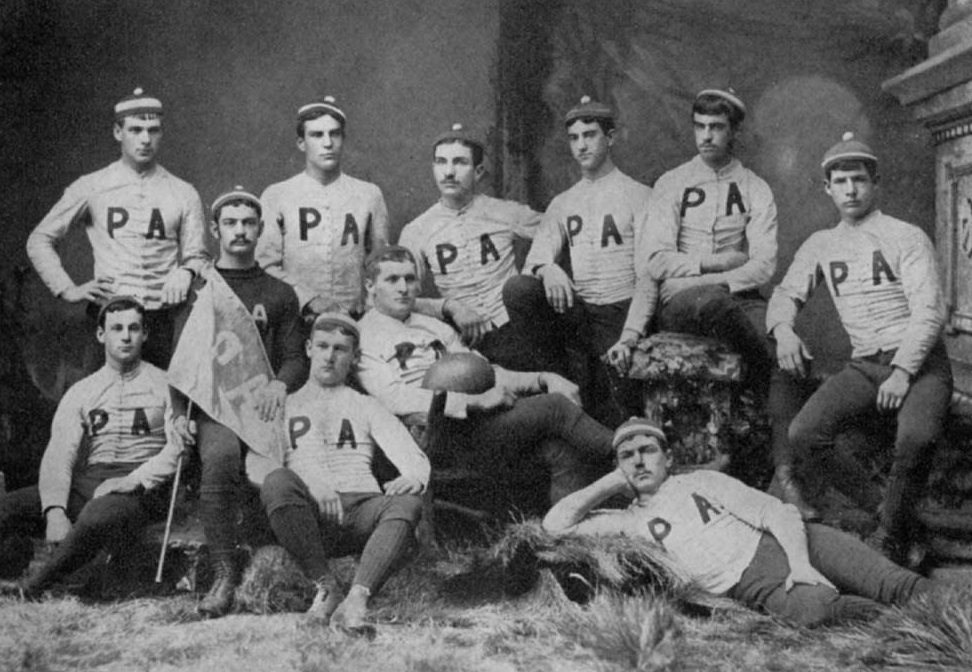
Andover football team posing for the school newspaper in 1883.

Today, Andover is an athletic powerhouse among New England private schools. Andover athletes have won over 110 New England championships in the last three decades. Some teams have even competed internationally; for example, the boys' crew has competed at England's Henley Royal Regatta.

Andover is not part of any formal athletic conference, but through its membership of the Eight Schools Association, it participates in certain ESA-specific athletic contests. In postseason play, Andover's teams compete in playoffs organized by the New England Preparatory School Athletic Council.

=== Sports ===
Andover offers 29 interscholastic programs and 44 intramural or instructional programs, including fencing, tai chi, figure skating, and yoga.

Fall athletic offerings

- Crew (instructional)
- Cross country
- Dance (Ballet, Modern, Hip-Hop; Beg–Adv levels)
- Fencing (instructional)
- Field hockey
- Skating (instructional)
- FIT (Fundamentals In Training)
- Football
- Gunga FIT ("extreme" version of FIT)
- Outdoor Pursuits (S&R)
- Pilates
- SLAM (instructional [cheerleading])
- Soccer
- Soccer (intramural)
- Squash (instructional)
- Swimming (instructional)
- Tennis (instructional)
- Volleyball (girls')
- Volleyball (instructional)
- Water polo (boys')
- Yoga
- Zumba

Winter athletic offerings

- Basketball
- Basketball (intramural)
- Dance (Ballet, Modern, Hip-Hop; Beg–Adv levels)
- FIT (Fundamentals In Training)
- Gunga FIT ("extreme" version of FIT)
- Hockey
- Hockey (intramural)
- Indoor cycling (instructional/cycling pre-season)
- Indoor track
- Junior Basketball (intramural)
- Nordic skiing
- Outdoor Pursuits (S&R)
- Recreational cross-country skiing
- SLAM (Spirit Leaders [cheerleading])
- Squash
- Squash (intramural)
- Swimming and diving
- Wrestling
- Yoga
- Zumba

Spring athletic offerings

- Baseball
- Crew
- Cycling
- Dance (Ballet, Modern, Hip-Hop; Beg–Adv levels)
- Fencing (instructional)
- FIT (Fundamentals In Training)
- Golf
- Gunga FIT ("extreme" version of FIT)
- Lacrosse
- Outdoor Pursuits (S&R)
- Pilates
- Softball
- Squash (instructional)
- Swimming (instructional)
- Tennis
- Tennis (intramural)
- Track
- Ultimate Frisbee
- Ultimate Frisbee (intramural)
- Volleyball (boys')
- Water polo (girls')
- Yoga

== Finances ==
=== Endowment and expenses ===
As of September 2024, Phillips Academy's financial endowment was $1.41 billion. In its Internal Revenue Service filings for the 2021–22 school year, the academy reported $110.2 million in program service expenses and $22.9 million in grants (primarily student financial aid).

The academy conducted a "record-setting" fundraising campaign from 2017 to 2023, raising $408.9 million. The campaign added over $103 million to the academy's financial aid endowment and raised $121 million to upgrade health, dormitory, library, music, and athletic facilities.

=== Tuition and financial aid ===
In the 2024–25 school year, Phillips Academy charged boarding students $73,780 and day students $57,190, of which financial aid covers approximately $58,000 for boarding students. The academy has a need-blind admission policy, and 47% of students receive financial aid. The academy also commits to meet 100% of each admitted student's demonstrated financial need, as determined by the academy's financial aid department.

In the twenty-first century, tuition charges at Phillips Academy have significantly increased. In the 2018–19 academic year, Phillips Academy charged boarding students $55,800 and day students $43,300, placing it among the most expensive boarding schools in the world.

Tuition at Phillips Academy since 2001
Year	Boarding Tuition	Day Student Tuition	Year/Year Boarding Increase %
2001–2002	$26,900	$20,900	(?)
2006–2007	$35,250	$27,450	6.82%
2011–2012	$42,350	$32,850	2.54%
2016–2017	$52,100	$40,500	3.58%
2021–2022	$61,950	$48,020	3.50%
2022–2023	$66,290	$51,380	7.01%
2023–2024	$69,600	$53,950	4.99%
2024–2025	$73,780	$57,190	6.01%
2025-2026	$76,731	$59,748	(?)

== Controversies ==
In 2013, Phillips Academy drew national attention for apparent bias against girls and women, as highlighted by a low number of girls in student leadership.

Reports in 2016 and 2017 identified several former teachers who had engaged in inappropriate sexual contact with students in the past. The academy hired an independent law firm to investigate allegations of misconduct, and the head of school, John Palfrey, and the head of the Board of Trustees, Peter Currie, sent an email to the Andover community stating that such transgressions must not recur.

== Notable alumni ==
Andover has educated two U.S. presidents (George H. W. Bush and George W. Bush), a Supreme Court justice (William Henry Moody), six Medal of Honor recipients (Civil War: 2; Spanish–American War: 1; World War II: 2; Korean War: 1), five Nobel laureates (making it one of only four secondary schools in the world to have educated five or more Nobel Prize winners), as well as winners of Tony, Grammy, Emmy and Academy Awards. It has educated numerous billionaires, including venture capitalist Tim Draper; private equity pioneer Ted Forstmann; oil heir and environmental philanthropist Ed Bass; Rahim Al-Hussaini Aga Khan V, 50th Imam of the Ismaili Muslims, and media heir Lachlan Murdoch.

=== Other notable alumni ===
- Alexander Trowbridge, U.S. Secretary of Commerce
- Anjali Sud, American Businesswoman, CEO of Tubi
- Benjamin Spock, pediatrician
- Bill Drayton, social entrepreneur
- Bill Veeck, owner of the Chicago White Sox and Cleveland Indians
- Buzz Bissinger, journalist
- Carl Andre, artist
- Julia Alvarez, writer
- Charles Ruff, White House Counsel to Bill Clinton
- Chris Hughes, co-founder of Facebook
- Christopher Wray, Director of the Federal Bureau of Investigation
- David B. Birney, Union General during the Civil War
- David Graeber, anthropologist and activist
- Edgar Rice Burroughs, author known for creating Tarzan of the Apes and John Carter of Mars;
- Bill Belichick, coach for the New England Patriots and recipient of eight Super Bowl rings
- Humphrey Bogart, an Academy Award-winning actor considered to be one of the greatest stars of American cinema
- Elizabeth Stuart Phelps, an early feminist and social reformer
- Francis Cabot Lowell, instrumental figure in the American Industrial Revolution and namesake of Lowell, Massachusetts
- George Church, geneticist
- Harlan Cleveland, U.S. Ambassador to NATO
- Heather Mac Donald, political commentator
- Henry L. Stimson, U.S. Secretary of State and Secretary of War
- Hiram Bingham III, Governor of Connecticut and U.S. Senator who rediscovered Machu Picchu
- Jack Lemmon, actor
- James Bell, U.S. Senator from New Hampshire
- Jeb Bush, former Governor of Florida, 2016 presidential candidate, and member of the Bush family
- Jigme Khesar Namgyel Wangchuck, King of Bhutan
- Philip K. Wrigley, chewing gum manufacturer
- John Berman, news anchor
- John Darnton, journalist
- Dana Delany, actress
- John F. Kennedy Jr., lawyer, journalist, and son of President John F. Kennedy
- Johnson N. Camden Jr., U.S. Senator from Kentucky
- Jonathan Alter, journalist for Newsweek and bestselling author
- Jonathan Dee, Pulitzer Prize-winning novelist
- Joseph Carter Abbott, U.S. Senator from North Carolina and colonel in the Civil War
- Joseph Cornell, influential avant-garde artist and filmmaker
- Josiah Quincy III, Mayor of Boston, President of Harvard University
- Kristen Faulkner, road cyclist
- Karl Kirchwey, poet
- Katie Porter, U.S. Representative for California's 45th congressional district
- Lincoln Chafee, U.S. Senator and Governor of Rhode Island
- Lucy Danziger, editor-in-chief of Self
- Michael Beschloss, historian
- Norman Cahners, publisher
- Oliver Wendell Holmes Sr., writer
- Olivia Wilde, director and actress
- Patrick J. Kennedy, U.S. Representative for Rhode Island's 1st congressional district and member of the Kennedy family
- Peter Currie, CFO of Netscape
- Peter Halley, postmodernist painter and essayist central to the development of Neogeo (art) in 1980s New York
- Raymond C. Clevenger, Senior U.S. Circuit Judge of the U.S. Court of Appeals for the Federal Circuit
- Richard H. Brodhead, president of Duke University
- Richard Theodore Greener, first African-American graduate of Harvard
- Robert B. Stearns, co-founder of Bear Stearns
- Sara Nelson, editor-in-chief of Publishers Weekly
- Sarah Rafferty, actress
- Scooter Libby, political advisor during the Bush administration
- Sokhary Chau, politician and mayor
- Seth Moulton, U.S. Representative for Massachusetts's 6th congressional district and 2020 presidential candidate
- Stephen Carlton Clark, founder of the Baseball Hall of Fame
- Sullivan Ballou, Union Civil War officer remembered for a letter written to his wife before he was killed at the Battle of Bull Run
- Theodore Dwight Weld, prominent abolitionist.
- Thomas C. Foley, U.S. Ambassador to Ireland
- Tracy Kidder, Pulitzer Prize-winning literary journalist
- Vanessa Kerry, physician, CEO Seed Global Health, World Health Organization Special Envoy for Climate Change and Health
- Vance C. McCormick, Chair of the DNC and of the American delegation at the Treaty of Versailles
- Victor Kiam, owner of the New England Patriots and entrepreneur
- Walker Evans, photojournalist
- Charles L. Flint, co-founder of the Massachusetts Institute of Technology and the University of Massachusetts Amherst
- A. Bartlett Giamatti, president of Yale University
- Walter Boardman Kerr, WWII correspondent for the New York Herald Tribune and author
- William Damon, noted psychologist and educator
- William King, first Governor of Maine and prominent proponent for Maine's statehood
- William R. Timken, U.S. Ambassador to Germany
- Willow Bay, journalist for the Huffington Post
- Jens David Ohlin, Cornell Law Dean and legal scholar
- Luke Cole, Environmental lawyer and activist

== In popular culture ==
=== Literature ===
- In J. D. Salinger's The Catcher in the Rye, Sally Hayes introduces Holden to a boy who attended Andover.
- F. Scott Fitzgerald's This Side of Paradise has several characters who attended Andover.
- Tom Wolfe's 1977 Mauve Gloves & Madmen, Clutter & Vine uses Andover as shorthand for the "elite prep" look.
- Lisa Birnbach's The Official Preppy Handbook references Andover repeatedly, calling it "humorlessly prep".
- Paul Monette's 1992 book Becoming a Man: Half a Life Story discusses his struggles being a gay student at Andover in the 1960s.

=== Theater and film ===
- John Guare's play Six Degrees of Separation has one character who laments that his parents could not afford to send him to Andover or Exeter.
- In the 1992 film Scent of a Woman, Charlie Simms (Chris O'Donnell) corrects Lt. Col. Frank Slade (Al Pacino) in pointing out that George H. W. Bush went to Andover.

=== Television ===
- George W. Bush sings a Phillips Academy fight song in a 2007 episode of American Dad!.
- A 2011 The Simpsons episode has T-shirts for "Springfield Andover" and "Phillips Springfield Academy".

=== Comics ===
- The Marvel Cinematic Universe references the school as being Tony Stark's high school from years 1977–1984 before continuing on to MIT.

== See also ==
- Abbot Academy
- List of Phillips Academy Heads of School
- List of Phillips Academy alumni
