= Anna Fuller =

- Born: November 9, 1853; Cambridge
- Died: July 11, 1916 (aged 62); Boston
- Education: Abbot Academy
- Occupation: Writer

Anna Fuller (November 9, 1853 – July 11, 1916) was an American novelist and short story writer.

Anna Fuller was born on November 9, 1853 in Cambridge, Massachusetts, the daughter of Robert Henry Fuller and Mary Lucretia Bent Fuller. She graduated from the Abbot Academy in Andover, Massachusetts. Her print debut was in the New York Evening Post at the age of 21, but her first book was not published until she was 38. That book was Pratt Portraits (1892), a popular collection of character studies originally published in Harper's Bazzar.

Her novel A Literary Courtship Under the Auspices of Pike's Peak (1893) features a pair of New Yorkers who travel to Colorado in search of the woman whose name one of them stole for a pseudonym. Her story collection Peak and Prairie: From a Colorado Sketchbook (1894) contains strong female protagonists and deals with issues such as spousal abuse and child abuse.

Anna Fuller died on 11 July 1916 in Boston.

== Bibliography ==
- Pratt Portraits: Sketched in a New England Suburb (1892)
- A Literary Courtship Under the Auspices of Pike's Peak (1893)
- Peak and Prairie: From a Colorado Sketchbook (1894)
- A Venetian June (1896)
- Katharine Day (1901)
- A Bookful of Girls (1905)
- Later Platt Portraits (1911)
- The Thunderland Lady (1913)
