= General Draper =

General Draper may refer to:

- Alonzo G. Draper (1835–1865), Union Army brevet brigadier general
- Dennis Draper (1875–1951), Canadian Militia brigadier general
- Warren Fales Draper (1883–1970), U.S. Army major general and Deputy Surgeon General of the U.S.
- William Draper (British Army officer) (1721–1787), British Army lieutenant general
- William Franklin Draper (politician) (1842–1910), Union Army brevet brigadier general
- William Henry Draper Jr. (1894–1974), U.S. Army major general

== See also ==
- Attorney General Draper (disambiguation)
