= Philena McKeen =

19th century American educator

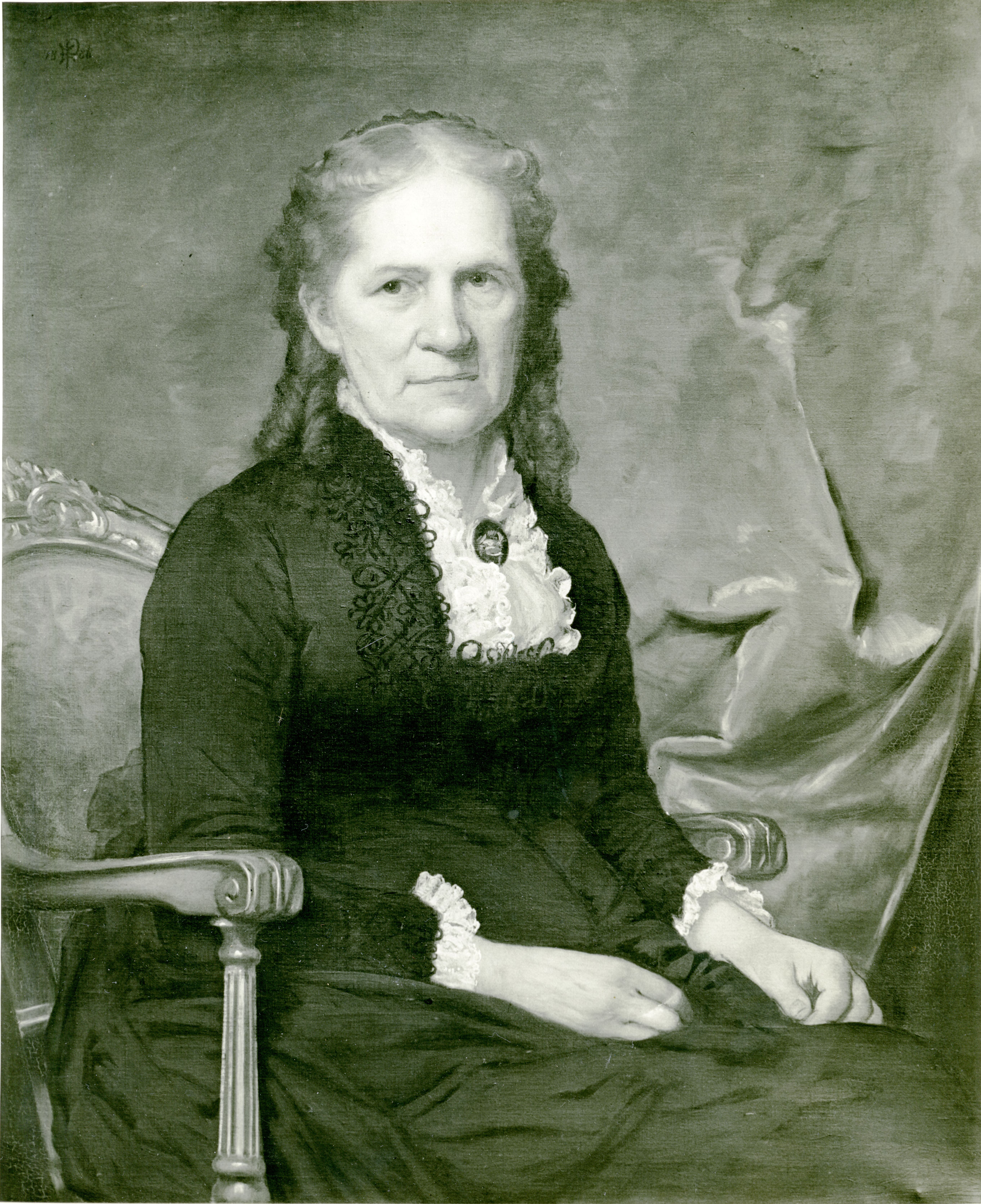

11th Principal of Abbot Academy
- In office 1859–1892
- Preceded by: Emma L. Taylor
- Succeeded by: Laura Sophia Watson

Personal details
- Born: Philena McKeen; June 13, 1822 Bradford, Vermont, US
- Died: June 13, 1898 (aged 76) Andover, Massachusetts, US
- Resting place: Upper Plain Cemetery, Bradford, Vermont
- Parent(s): Rev. Dr. Silas McKeen; Hannah Johnston

Philena McKeen (June 13, 1822 – May 13, 1898) was an American educator and the 11th principal of Abbot Academy in Andover, Massachusetts. During her thirty-year tenure, she managed the school in its "Golden Age" and established a curriculum that "educated for life."

== Early life ==
Philena McKeen was born on June 13, 1822, to Silas McKeen, a minister, and his second wife Hannah Johnston, in Bradford, Vermont. She was one of seven children, four of whom died of tuberculosis during childhood. Her home was a stop on the Underground Railroad for much of the 19th century. Her father homeschooled her and provided a more thorough education than the local schools.

== Career ==
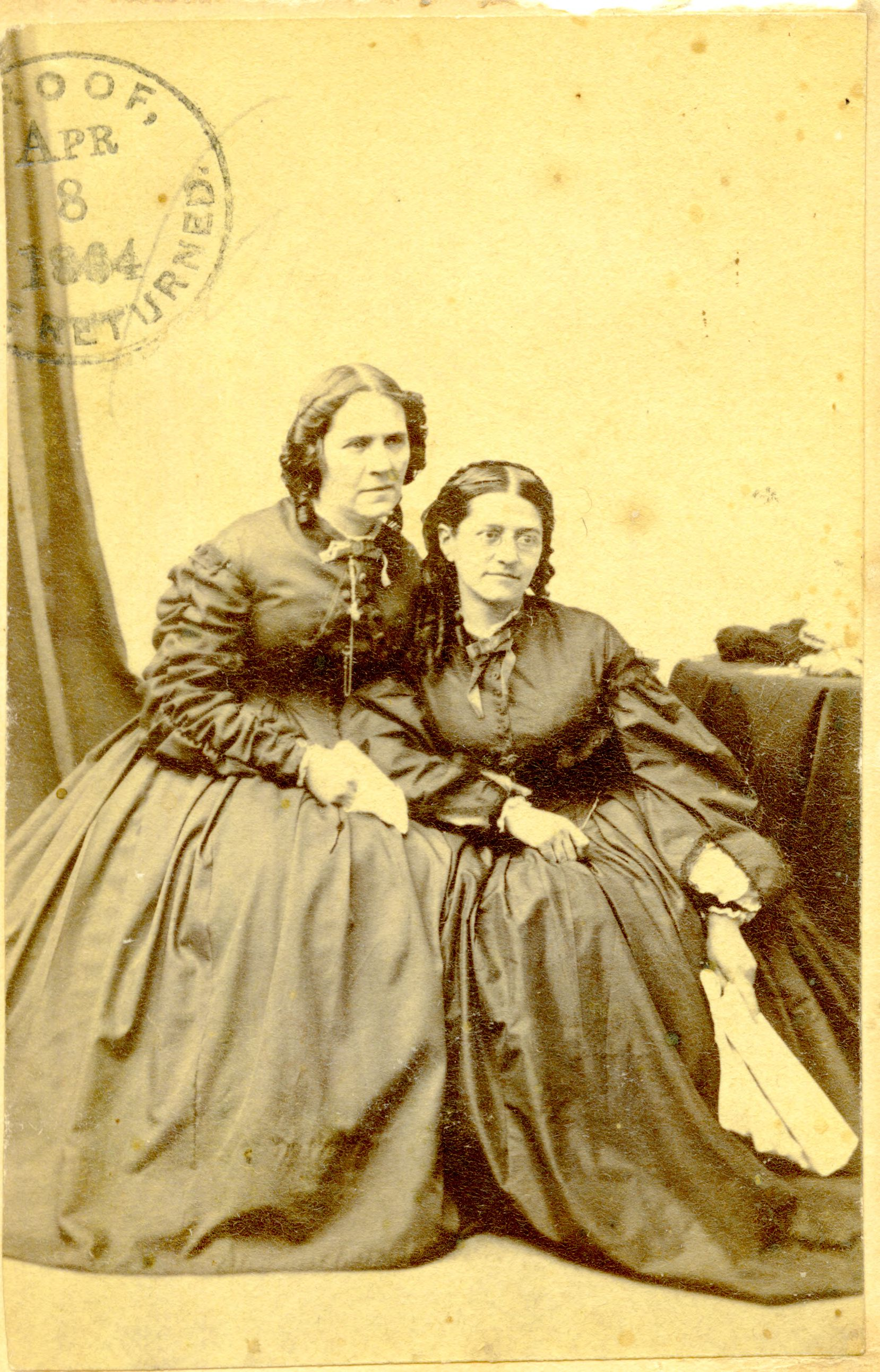
Philena (left) and Phebe McKeen (right)

McKeen taught at Mount Holyoke College and schools in Brighton, Maine and College Hill, Ohio in her early career. In 1855, she and her sister Phebe McKeen accepted jobs at the newly founded Western Female Seminary in Oxford, Ohio. Meanwhile, Abbot Academy in Andover, Massachusetts was struggling to find a new principal. The trustees, all men, wanted a female principal, and one that would stay for a long time. Philena and Phebe McKeen's careers were young and they made good candidates. In September 1859, they moved to Andover to become principal and assistant principal of Abbot Academy.

Philena McKeen's colleagues at Abbot Academy encouraged her to maintain the status quo, but she saw a school that was in desperate need of improvement. The library was small, the buildings were worn out and lacked decoration, and students had few supplies. The campus sat on just one acre. To raise money, she sold waste paper from students and organized lectures and other events with entrance fees. Boys from nearby Phillips Academy and Andover Theological Seminary were invited to perform in plays and participate in games. (Note: In a game of charades, students imitated crows by flapping constructed umbrella wings) Some funds came from members of the trustees. McKeen soon had the funds to clean buildings, add carpets and wall pictures, and purchase new silverware for the dining hall.

As the Civil War ensued, Abbot Academy supported Abraham Lincoln and the North. Students knit socks, rolled bandages, and sent letters to soldiers. The school experienced considerable growth during that time. McKeen reinvested profits into enlarging and improving the campus buildings and grounds. In charge of admissions, she created entrance exams to manage a large number of applications. According to Susan Lloyd, McKeen had brought the school into a "Golden Age".

=== Curriculum ===
McKeen's curriculum was influenced by her homeschooling as a child in Vermont. She believed Abbot Academy could be a college in its own right as a "healthful, refined, safe home" where students became "fit for teaching, for travel, for educated society, for church work, for literary clubs, and more than all, for cultivated Christian homes".

In language, French and German were "the mark of a sophisticated woman" according to McKeen. She had a personal interest in the history of the Christian church and art and added classes in these areas, too. While her curriculum could be considered unique, she was conservative when it came to English literature. She only taught from classic, accepted writers like Milton and ignored modern figures like Emerson and Thoreau. Meanwhile, other subjects were left at the wayside. Abbot had a weak science department, having to rely on Phillips Academy for supplies. Nonetheless, McKeen continued to improve the school's reputation. It wasn't until the 1870s when Cecil Bancroft became the new principal of Phillips Academy after the death of Samuel Harvey Taylor that they began to catch up with Abbot's curriculum.

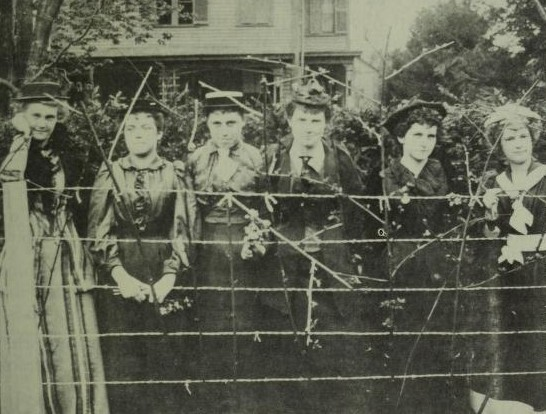
McKeen's fence ca. 1874

Abbot teachers stayed longer and became more invested in the school. They advocated for improvements that would fill in the gaps left by McKeen in the early years of her tenure. She welcomed these changes. Samuel Morse Downs, a music teacher, secured twelve pianos for the school. Additionally, she worked with colleagues to raise money for her own ideas. She purchased specimens for botany and zoological courses. McKeen worked with Edwards Amasa Park to purchase a statue for art history. In 1875, McKeen purchased a telescope and observatory with funds raised by Mary Belcher, a Latin and astronomy teacher.

McKeen provided her students with a wealth of resources. Abbot students had access to not only the books of their own school but those of Phillips Academy and the Andover Theological Seminary, too. Naturally, this would have led to social intermingling between students if it weren't for the strict rules set upon them. McKeen believed the ideal husband was a minister and furthermore that women rushed too quickly into marriage. Phillips Academy instructors agreed and helped her with her cause. She severely limited interaction with Phillips Academy boys with the hope of controlling what is described by a historian as an "ominous sexual awakening". McKeen constructed fences, recruited student spies, and expelled at least two students for flirting. Regardless, students mingled anyway and it was nearly impossible for her to exert complete control. McKeen considered coeducation but preferred to remain separate in light of a new wave of Victorian thinking that called for the protection of the qualities considered superior in women.

=== Semicentennial ===
In 1879, Abbot Academy celebrated its semicentennial. McKeen organized a great event for the occasion attended by about two thousand guests on a lawn near the South Church of Andover. The following year she and her sister Phebe authored a semicentennial history of the school published by Warren F. Draper, a fellow trustee. (Note: Annals of Fifty Years: A History of Abbot Academy, Andover, Mass., 1829-1879 by Philena and Phebe McKeen)

== Later life ==
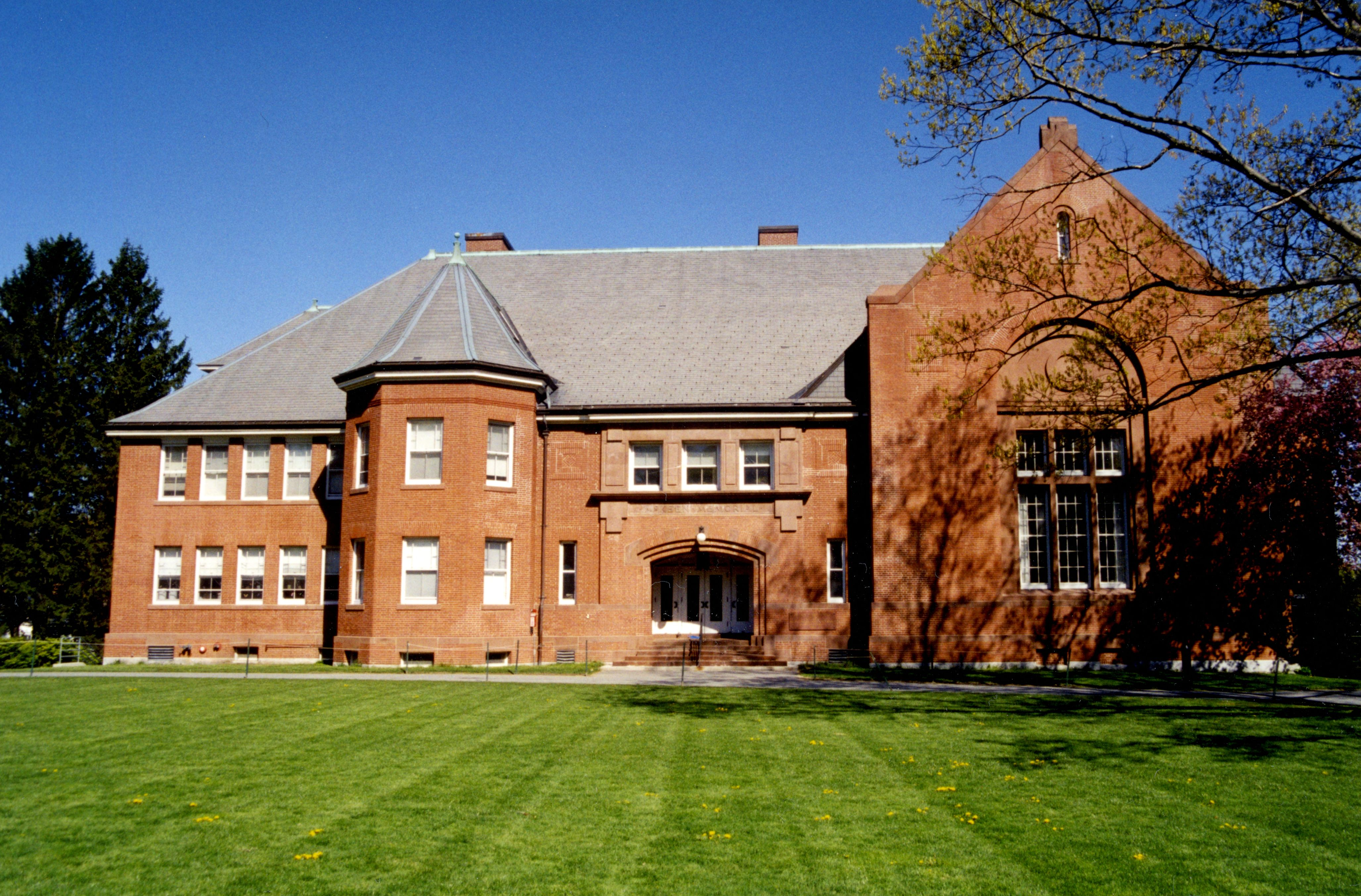
McKeen Hall, Abbot Academy, Andover, Massachusetts

In 1880 Phebe McKeen, her sister and longtime friend, died of tuberculosis. Philena was devastated but eventually recovered and continued her duties.

As principal, she worked to allow women to take on a greater role in society, in response to the increasing uncertainty of gender roles in the late 19th century. In addition to academics, McKeen considered herself the religious leader of the school, although the two were often intertwined. Women were not allowed to take on leadership roles in the church, and she actively criticized the Congregational church for enforcing these rules. McKeen also added women to the previously all-male board of trustees.

The semicentennial celebration of 1879 fueled a new push for updated facilities. McKeen made plans for a $150,000 project for a set of new buildings. In charge of fundraising, she tapped into a growing alumnae network but had trouble meeting her goal. She nearly resigned in 1888 when funding fell short and increasingly suffered from rheumatism, but renewed financial support from Warren Draper allowed construction to begin. The new building, named Draper Hall, was completed in 1890. Further campus improvements included electric lighting and better food. She hoped amenities like these would allow Abbot Academy to compete with some of the leading colleges for women at the time such as Smith and Wellesley College.

McKeen retired in 1892. On April 9, over 350 people attended a banquet in Boston hosted by trustees and alumnae. The trustees renovated a house on the Abbot campus nicknamed "Sunset Lodge" for her. During retirement, she wrote a sequel to her semicentennial history, published in 1897. (Note: Sequel to Annals of Fifty Years: A History of Abbot Academy, Andover, Mass., 1879-1892 by Philena McKeen)

Outside of Abbot Academy, McKeen was involved in the Andover November Club and the Andover Village Improvement Society (AVIS). She was a director of AVIS and worked to preserve and beautify a triangle of land, known as the Manse Green, opposite the South Church at a street intersection. She spent her summers at York Beach, Maine.

== Legacy ==
On May 13, 1898, she died suddenly. She was never married. She was buried in her hometown of Bradford, Vermont. A memorial was published and funds were raised to construct a new building in honor of her and her sister. McKeen Hall was dedicated in June 1904, the 75th anniversary of the school. The building contained classrooms, a study hall, and an assembly and gym hall. The building fell out of use after Abbot Academy was acquired by Phillips Academy in 1973. The building was used for storage until a renovation in the early 1990s. Today it has administrative offices and a community daycare center.

Abbot Academy continued to compete with colleges into the twentieth century as McKeen had in the nineteenth. She did not want Abbot to become a preparatory school. It could not last, however, and the school created a four-year college preparatory curriculum in the early twentieth century to appeal to a new generation of women.

== See also ==
- Elizabeth Robinson Abbott

== Bibliography ==
- Domingue, Robert A. (1990). "Chapter IX: Abbot Academy". Phillips Academy Andover, Massachusetts: An Illustrated History of the Property (Including Abbot Academy). RAD Publishing Co. ISBN 9780962072628.
- Downs, Annie Sawyer, ed. (1898). Memorial: Philena McKeen, June 13, 1822, May 13, 1898. Andover, MA: n.p.
- Lloyd, Susan McIntosh (1979). A Singular School: Abbot Academy 1828-1973. Andover, MA, Hanover, NH: Phillips Academy, The University Press of New England.
- McKean, Cornelius (1902). McKean Genealogies from the Early Settlement of McKeans or McKeens in America to the Present Time, 1902. Des Moines: The Kenyon Printing & Mfg. Co.
- McKeen, Philena; McKeen, Phebe (1880). Annals of Fifty Years: A History of Abbot Academy, Andover, Mass., 1829-1879. Andover, MA: Warren F. Draper.
- McKeen, Philena (1897). Sequel to Annals of Fifty Years: A History of Abbot Academy, Andover, Mass., 1879-1892. Andover, MA: Warren F. Draper.
- Mofford, Juliet Haines (1980). AVIS: A History in Conservation. Andover, MA: Andover Village Improvement Society.
- Roberts, Paige (December 5, 2019). "McKeen Memorial Hall, 1903-1904, at Phillips Academy". Clio: Your Guide to History. The Clio. Archived from the original on September 11, 2023.
- Sklar, Kathryn Kish (1976). Catharine Beecher: A Study in American Domesticity. New York: W. W. Norton & Company. ISBN 9780393008128.
