= James Draper (settler) =

Colonial Massachusetts settler (1622–1694)

James Draper "The Puritan"
- Born: 28 July 1622; Heptonstall, Yorkshire, England
- Died: 13 July 1697 (aged 74); Roxbury, Massachusetts
- Resting place: Westerly Burial Ground, West Roxbury
- Citizenship: England
- Occupation: Weaver
- Spouse: Miriam Stansfield (1646-1697)
- Children: 9
- Parent(s): William Thomas Draper and Grace Mitchell
- Relatives: Andrew Sloan Draper, William F. Draper, Simeon Draper, Eben Sumner Draper, Eben S. Draper Jr., George A. Draper, Francis Draper Lewis, William Draper Lewis, Lyman C. Draper, Warren Fales Draper, Wickliffe Draper, Charles Stark Draper, Dexter W. Draper, Dorothy Draper, Mary Draper, Ruth Draper, Polly Draper, William Henry Draper Jr., William Henry Draper III, William Draper Jr., William G. Draper
- Family: Draper

James Draper "The Puritan" (c. 1622–1694) was an early settler of the Massachusetts Bay Colony. He was born and married in Heptonstall, Yorkshire, England, and came with his wife to New England shortly after 1647. He was a weaver by profession, and settled in the Massachusetts town of Roxbury, but also lived for a short while in the towns of Dedham and Charlestown. He and his wife had nine children and many notable descendants. They are buried in the Westerly Burial Ground in West Roxbury, now a neighbourhood of Boston, and share the oldest marker in the cemetery.

== Life ==
Coat of Arms of James Draper

Born in about 1622 and baptized 28 July 1622 in Heptonstall, Yorkshire, England, James Draper was the fourth child of William Thomas Draper (1578–1635) and Grace Mitchell (1582–1635) of the same place. Draper became a weaver, which was also the occupation of his father. He married, while in England, Miriam Stansfield on 21 April 1646, the daughter of Gideon Stansfield and Grace Eastwood, residents of Wadsworth in Yorkshire.

James emigrated to New England some time shortly after 1647. He first resided in the Massachusetts town of Roxbury, where his next three children were born between about 1650 and 1654. His next residence was in Dedham where his following three children were born, but he returned to Roxbury where his last two children were born, and where he and his wife died and were buried. Draper also lived for a short time in Charlestown where he sold part of an orchard to Jonathan Carey in 1672. He was an original proprietor of the town of Lancaster, but appears to have never lived there. In 1690, Draper became a freeman of Roxbury, and this is the last public record with his name until after his death.

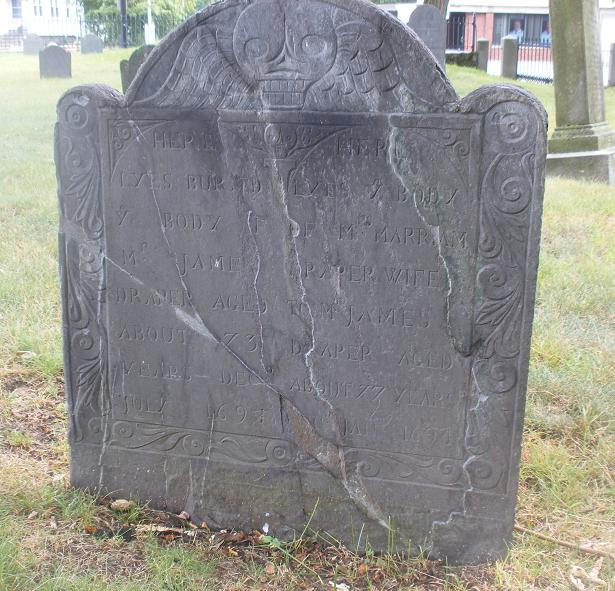
Grave marker for James and Miriam Draper; oldest marker in Westerly Burial Ground, West Roxbury, Massachusetts

In 1682, Draper and Jonathan Fairbanks petitioned the Town of Dedham to build a fulling mill on Mother Brook, but the selectmen granted the right to Draper and Nathaniel Whiting instead.

According to his tombstone, Draper died 13 July 1697, and the following month, on 19 August, his widow appeared before the Suffolk County probate judge, petitioning the court to allow her two sons, James and Jonathan, to be given administration of her husband's estate. The ensuing inventory showed a very modest estate valued at £72, of which £25 was the value given for the house, shop, barn and home lot. The inventory also included an acre of meadow in Dedham.

His wife, Miriam, died the January after her husband's death [1697/8], and both James and Miriam Draper share a tombstone in the Westerly Burial Ground in West Roxbury, now a neighborhood of Boston. The entry plaque to the cemetery reads in part: "The oldest gravestone, from 1691, commemorates James and Merriam Draper, members of a prominent West Roxbury family." The year 1691 is incorrect; James died 13 July 1697 and his widow Miriam died the following January, which correctly reads "January 1697" on the marker, but technically should read 1697/8, as January was near the end of the year in the old calendar. Also, there was no town of West Roxbury when these people flourished; they lived in what was then called Roxbury.

== Family and descendants ==
James and Miriam Draper had nine children, of whom the first, Miriam, was born in England, and the remainder were all born in Massachusetts. The oldest surviving child, Susanna, married John Bacon; the next child, Sarah, married James Hadlock; and the oldest son, James, married Abigail Whiting. (Note: Neiswander says that Draper was related "through marriage" to Nathaniel Whiting.) The next son, John, married Abigail Mason; Daniel married Elizabeth Brackett; Patience married Ebenezer Cass; and Jonathan married Sarah Jackson.

Some genealogical sources indicate the oldest child of James and Miriam Draper, also named Miriam, was born and died in England in 1647, shortly after which the couple immigrated to New England. However, there is strong evidence that the eldest daughter, Miriam, in fact married Daniel Holbrook. James Draper, Daniel Holbrook and Miriam Holbrook signed a deed 5 November 1672. The land was bounded on one side by land owned by James Draper. In 1673, Daniel Holbrook died as a result of an accident. Daniel's widow Miriam signed a paper relinquishing administration on his estate, which was insolvent. Her signature was witnessed by James Draper.

Among Draper's noted descendants are federal judge, educator and author Andrew Sloan Draper; Civil War officer and U.S. Representative William F. Draper; New York politician Simeon Draper; Massachusetts governor Eben Sumner Draper and his brother, textile industrialist George A. Draper. Other notable descendants include Morgan, Lewis & Bockius co-founder Francis Draper Lewis and his first cousin, University of Pennsylvania Law School dean William Draper Lewis; historian Lyman C. Draper; publisher Warren Fales Draper; noted segregationist Wickliffe Draper, and Deputy Surgeon General, Dr. Warren Fales Draper, who was a member of General Dwight Eisenhower's staff in Europe during World War II.

== Image gallery ==
Entry sign to Westerly Burial Ground

Entry plaque to Westerly Cemetery, mentioning the earliest tombstone, belonging to James and Miriam Draper

== Works cited ==
- Neiswander, Judith (2024). Mother Brook and the Mills of East Dedham. Damianos Publishing. ISBN 978-1-941573-66-2.

== Bibliography ==
- Draper, Thomas Waln–Morgan (1892). The Drapers in America, being a History and Genealogy of those of that Name and Connection. New York: John Polhemus Printing Company. p. 147. "john cheney elizabeth currig."
