= Attorney General Draper =

Attorney General Draper may refer to:

- Thomas Draper (1864–1946), Attorney-General of Western Australia
- William Henry Draper (judge) (1801–1877), Attorney-General of the Province of Canada

== See also ==
- General Draper (disambiguation)
