= Mary H. Graves =

American minister, literary editor, writer (1839–1908)

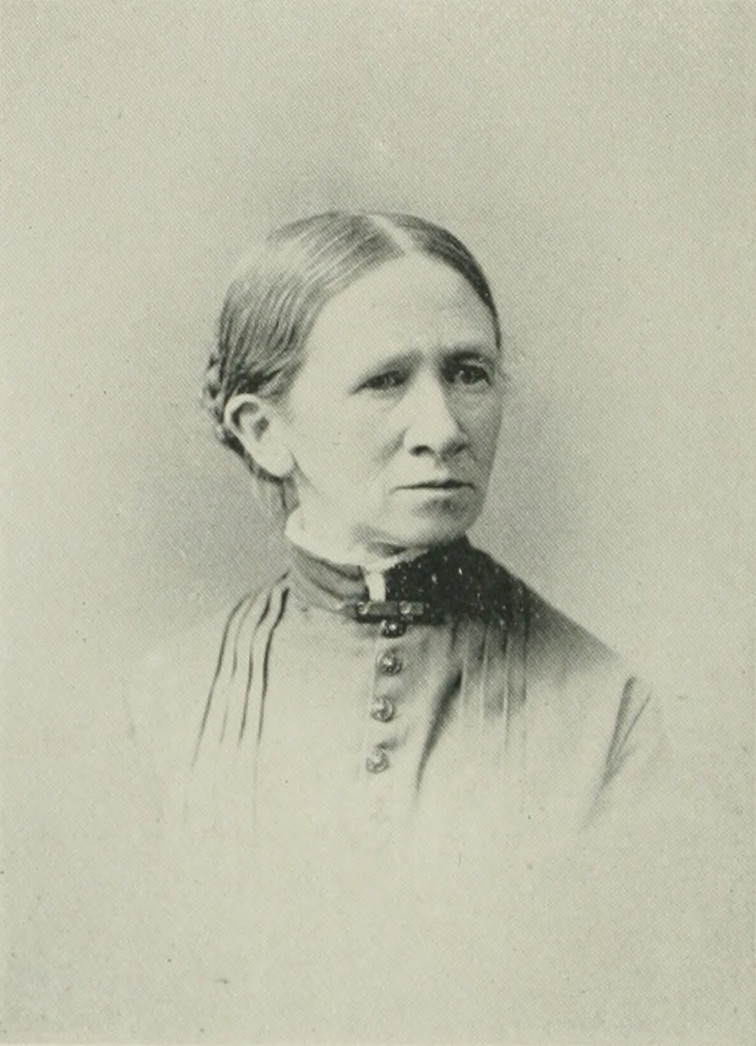
- Photo in A Woman of the Century
- Born: Mary Hannah Graves; September 12, 1839; North Reading, Massachusetts, U.S.
- Died: December 5, 1908 (aged 69); Boston, Massachusetts, U.S.
- Resting place: Riverside Cemetery in North Reading, Massachusetts, U.S.
- Education: Abbot Academy, State Normal School at Salem
- Occupations: minister; literary editor; writer
- Writing career
- Language: English
- Notable work: Sketches of representative women of New England

Mary H. Graves (September 12, 1839 – December 5, 1908) was an American Unitarian minister, literary editor, and writer of the long nineteenth century. After Julia Ward Howe, Graves was the second woman to be ordained within this Christian theological movement. Her studies had been guided by Rev. Olympia Brown of the Universalist faith. She was ordained by James Freeman Clarke as a Unitarian minister, and passed years in several pastorates, the earliest of which was at Mansfield, Massachusetts. She preached with acceptance in various places in the west, in Peoria, Illinois, Earlville, Illinois, and Manitou, Colorado. In later years, unable to keep up with the duties of the ministry, her time was filled with literary work. She contributed occasionally to the pages of The Christian Register, and other periodicals. With Julia Ward Howe, Graves edited a volume on the eminent women of New England, Sketches of representative women of New England (1904).

== Early life and education ==
Mary Hannah Graves was born in North Reading, Massachusetts, September 12, 1839. Her parents were Eben Graves, a farmer, and Hannah M. (Campbell) Graves. Her parents had six children who grew to maturity. The mother, who died May 21, 188i, was a sister of James S. and John B. Campbell. The father, Eben Graves, a lifelong resident of North Reading, was a farmer and market—man. Kind-hearted and a good friend to the poor, he was a man of few words. When his sudden death from apoplexy, January 2, 1872, was announced, that evening at the Farmers’ Club a spontaneous tribute was paid to his memory in the general utterance, "He was an honest man.” His father was Capt. Daniel Graves, a young soldier in the Revolution. The parish records show that the captain was a man of more than ordinary influence in the old North Precinct. He served two terms in the State legislature and in various town offices. Her maternal ancestors, the Campbells and Moores, were descendants of the Scotch-Irish settlers of Londonderry, New Hampshire.

Graves attended the school in the “lower end" ward, afterwards a term at the Abbot Academy at Andover, Massachusetts and graduated from the State Normal School (now Salem State University), Salem, Massachusetts, in February, 1860.

== Career ==
Graves taught in the public schools of her own town and in the Bowditch School, South Danvers, now Peabody, Massachusetts. As a teacher she was thirty years ahead of her time. Her generous teaching included cultivating the imagination and the finer qualities of the mind through drawing, and reading, and botany. But this went unappreciated as parsing, ciphering, and the memorizing of map questions were the favored approached of the public schools in that. Failing to garner appreciation by school examiners, she left the teaching profession.

Like most of the thoughtful minds of her time, she sought intellectual gratification. She found it first in writing for the newspaper press, writing for The Ladies' Repository and other journals.

Then she was led to the study of theology. Graves took a theological course of study under Rev. Olympia Brown in Weymouth, Massachusetts. In the summer of 1869, she supplied the pulpit of the Universalist church in North Reading, and during the fall and winter, while studying in Bridgeport, Connecticut, preached in New Haven and other places in that State. The summer of 1870 she spent in Illinois, preaching at Earlville, Illinois. Returning to Massachusetts in September, she was next invited to the pulpit of the Unitarian church in Mansfield, Massachusetts, and after an active ministry of over a year, on December 14, 1871, was regularly ordained as its pastor of the Unitarian Church in Mansfield. This was the first instance of the ordination of a woman by Unitarians in the State. A large council, representing many different churches convened for this purpose, took unusual care in examining the action of the parish and the preparation of the candidate.

Graves' health was never vigorous, and this affected her ability for continuous pastoral work after her placement in Mansfield. However, in 1882, she had pastoral charge of the Unitarian Society in Baraboo, Wisconsin, and she managed some missionary work in the West, mainly in Illinois and adjoining States.

In 1885 and 1886, while living in Chicago, she assisted in the conduct of Manford's Magazine, acting as literary editor. For one year, she was secretary of the Women's Western Unitarian Conference. Recognizing that her strength was not sufficient to allow her to do the full work of the ministry, Graves moved to Boston, and devoted herself to literary work. She contributed occasionally to The Christian Register, the Commonwealth, the Boston Transcript, the Leader, and other journals. She also took great interest in the genealogy of New Zealand, and her efforts helped many families.

== Death ==
Graves died December 5, 1908, in Boston, and was buried at Riverside Cemetery in North Reading.
