= Andrew S. Draper =

American politician

Andrew Sloan Draper
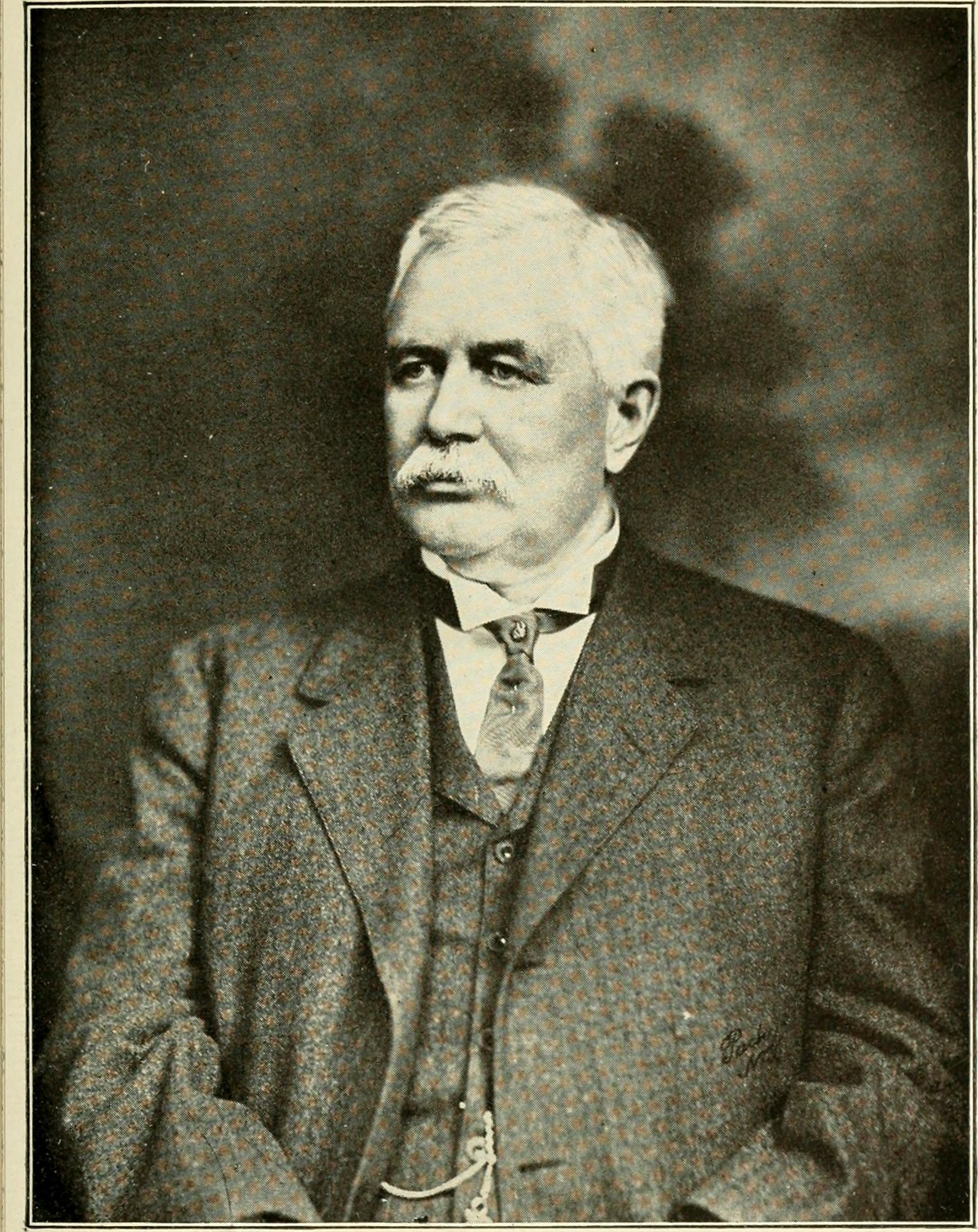

4th President of the University of Illinois system
- In office 1894–1904
- Preceded by: Thomas Jonathan Burrill
- Succeeded by: Edmund J. James

1st Commissioner of Education of the State of New York
- In office 1904–1913
- Preceded by: Office established
- Succeeded by: John Huston Finley

Member of the New York State Assembly from the Albany County, 2nd district
- In office January 1, 1881 – December 31, 1881
- Preceded by: Hiram Griggs
- Succeeded by: Aaron Fuller

Personal details
- Born: June 21, 1848 Westford, New York, U.S.
- Died: April 27, 1913 (aged 64) Albany, New York, U.S.
- Profession: Educator; college administrator; jurist

Andrew Sloan Draper (June 21, 1848 – April 27, 1913) was an American educator, author, and jurist.

== Biography ==
He was born in Westford, New York, on June 21, 1848, and is a descendant of early Massachusetts settler James Draper. He graduated from The Albany Academy and Albany Law School. He was a member of the New York State Assembly (Albany Co., 2nd D.) in 1881; and a judge of the United States court of Alabama claims before devoting himself to educational work.

He then served as a member of the Albany School-board, New York State Superintendent of Public Instruction from 1886 to 1892, and superintendent of schools at Cleveland, Ohio, before becoming the President and Regent of the University of Illinois in 1894. In 1902 his right leg was amputated.

He resigned from his presidency in 1904 to become the first Commissioner of Education of the State of New York.

He died on April 27, 1913, in Albany, New York, of Bright's disease and heart trouble. His widow died in 1928.

== Selected works ==
- The Organization and Administration of City-School Systems, 1888
- American Schools and American Citizenship, 1891
- Public School Pioneering in New York and Massachusetts, 1892
- American Universities and National Life

New York State Assembly
Preceded by Hiram Griggs	New York State Assembly; Albany County, 2nd District; 1881	Succeeded by Aaron Fuller
