= Warren Fales Draper =

United States Army general

- Born: August 9, 1883; Cambridge, Massachusetts, U.S.
- Died: March 19, 1970 (aged 86); Washington D.C., U.S.
- Burial place: Columbia Gardens Cemetery; Arlington, Virginia, U.S.
- Military career
- Allegiance: United States of America
- Branch: U.S. Public Health Service
- Service years: 1910–47
- Rank: Deputy Surgeon General; Major general (U.S. Army)
- Awards: Distinguished Service Medal; Honorary Companion of the Bath; Croix de Guerre with palm Order of Orange-Nassau; Order of Leopold II; Albert Lasker Group Award
- Other work: Virginia State Health Commissioner; Executive Medical Officer, United Mine Workers Welfare and Retirement Fund

Warren Fales Draper (August 9, 1883 – March 19, 1970) was Assistant Surgeon General and later Deputy Surgeon General of the United States Public Health Service. After graduating from Harvard Medical School in 1910, Draper entered the Public Health Service, completing a two-year tour on the west coast followed by assignments near Washington D.C. During World War I he was commissioned by the U. S. Army as a sanitation officer, working at Camp Lee and Newport News, both in Virginia, and then conducting relief activities during influenza outbreaks in New England and Pennsylvania. Draper returned to the Public Health Service in 1919, and in 1922 was promoted to assistant surgeon general ahead of his peers. When the Virginia State Commissioner of Health died in 1931, the state's governor borrowed Draper to fill the position, which he did for three years. Five years after once again returning to the Public Health Service, in 1939, Draper was appointed as the Deputy Surgeon General, which position he held until his retirement.

During World War II, Draper was brought into the United States Army with the rank of brigadier general, and served in Europe under General Dwight D. Eisenhower as a member of the Civil Affairs Branch of the Supreme Headquarters Allied Expeditionary Force (SHAEF). Put in charge of the Public Health division, he was quickly promoted to major general, and received recognition for his work with the vexing public health issues created by the war, and their impact on the ability of the Allies to fight. Dr. Draper returned to the Public Health Service after the war, and retired from that organization in 1947.

Shortly after his retirement he became the assistant vice president for health services for the American Red Cross, but in 1948 was named the executive medical officer for the United Mine Workers (UMW) Welfare and Retirement Fund. Under his supervision, the fund created ten union-operated hospitals in coal mining regions of Kentucky, Virginia, and West Virginia. His two-decade tenure with this program brought him recognition and awards from the medical community. He retired from this position with the UMW in September 1969, but continued with the union as the special assistant in the newly formed UMW Department of Occupational Health until his death in 1970.

Draper was influential in many professional organizations and was the president of several of them. He lectured at a number of medical schools, authored 61 articles on public health and preventive medicine, and co-authored several books and pamphlets. His humanity, humor, compassion and warmth of character are evident in many of his writings, and in the words of those who knew him.

== Ancestry and early life ==
Draper was born in Cambridge, Massachusetts, on August 9, 1883, the son of William Burgess Draper (May 16, 1852 – March 11, 1939) and Carrie Marie Drew (October 3, 1856 – February 8, 1924). His father was a businessman and somewhat of an inventor who became financially independent when he divided a property he owned in Boston and sold it off as house lots. His grandfather, Daniel Fisher Draper (1822–1874), was a dentist who had a successful practice in Cambridge until chronic poor lung health resulted in his premature death. Draper had one sibling, his younger brother Elwyn Burgess Draper who, after serving in the United States Navy during World War I, was a career businessman.

Warren Draper as an athlete at Waban School

Draper was named for his grandfather's oldest brother, the first Warren Fales Draper (1818–1905), who flourished in the publishing business in Andover, Massachusetts, for nearly fifty years. Being successful in his trade, and having no children, the earlier Warren Draper made substantial gifts to his church and local schools and provided scholarships to aspiring students. The family descends from James Draper, known as "James the Puritan" who emigrated from Yorkshire, England, to Roxbury, Massachusetts, shortly after 1647.

As children, Draper and his younger brother Elwyn grew up in Cambridge, and later moved to Newton Highlands, Massachusetts. Draper spent his summers working on a farm near Liberty, Maine, belonging to friends of his parents, where he earned no money, but learned the value of hard work. He attended Newton High School for two years, but wanted to go to college with two of his very close friends who were a year ahead of him. In order to graduate a year ahead of schedule, he took some summer courses and then completed his high school requirements in a single year at Waban School for Boys where he also participated in a variety of sports. In 1902 he graduated from high school, and later that year began his studies at Amherst College. Draper was attracted to Amherst because he was provided a scholarship covering tuition costs from his namesake who had graduated from there in 1848. Draper thought Amherst to be an exceptional school, but considered himself a mediocre student because of his other wide-ranging interests, such as attending fraternity parties, skating, and canoeing, usually with his future wife who was in the same year class at Smith College. Draper had wanted to be a medical doctor since he was a youngster, and upon graduating from Amherst in 1906, he began his studies at Harvard Medical School.

During his first two years of medical school Draper lived at home, but for his final two years he and a roommate rented a place near the school and hospital. Shortly before his graduation he was married in Detroit, Michigan on April 6, 1910, to Margaret Gansevoort Maxon (October 29, 1883 – April 28, 1967), the daughter of William D. and Anna (Lush) Maxon of Detroit, but originally from Waterford, New York. Margaret had attended Smith College in Northampton, Massachusetts, earning a Bachelor of Arts degree in classics. A month after his marriage, Draper earned his MD degree, then went to Washington, D.C., to take the United States Public Health Service entrance exam. In June, he and Margaret went to a summer cottage in Morrisville, Vermont, awaiting the exam results and news of his first assignment.

== Years in the Public Health Service ==
=== West Coast duty ===
Draper finished second on the Public Health Service exam, out of about 25 examinees, and in August 1910 reported to his first assignment at the quarantine station on Angel Island in the San Francisco Bay. Having seldom been far from their homes, Draper and his wife traveled the scenic route to the West Coast by taking the Canadian Pacific Railway over the Rocky Mountains to Vancouver, followed by a boat trip to Seattle, and then another train to San Francisco.

Work at the quarantine station involved meeting and boarding ships arriving from Asia, and inspecting all of the passengers for plague, yellow fever, small pox, typhus, and leprosy. If any individuals were suspected of having any of these diseases, they were taken to the station for quarantine. If an active case of small pox was found, then the entire passenger and crew population of the ship was put into quarantine.

U.S. Revenue Cutter Service cutter Bear

In April 1911 Draper received orders for a tour as Ship's Surgeon on the U.S. Revenue Cutter Service cutter Bear, which assignment would last until Thanksgiving. Still being a newlywed, Draper was distraught over the pending separation from his wife and began questioning his suitability to the Public Health Service. He considered getting out of the service then, but could not financially withstand being without a job. He and his wife decided to visit the ship and had lunch with the crew members who were very kind to the couple. Following this, Margaret told Draper he should do the tour, and that she would be fine. Draper was still unsure of his suitability to the health service, and before sailing he had a talk with the regional Public Health Service representative in San Francisco, Dr. Rupert Blue. Dr. Blue was very understanding and told Draper to see him when his ship tour was over.

Once underway, Bear followed the West Coast of the United States from San Diego, California, to Point Barrow, Alaska. Draper was able to make home visits to ailing Iñupiat in many villages on the ship's ports of call. Upon completion of the tour, he became the resident physician at San Francisco Immigration Hospital. He was not able to revisit Dr. Blue, who had since left to become the Surgeon General following the death of Dr. Walter Wyman. Blue had not forgotten Draper, however, and made arrangements for him to attend a "refresher course" at the Hygienic Laboratory in Washington, D.C.

=== Washington, D.C., assignments ===
Early in September 1912, Draper and his wife moved back east to Washington, D.C. Draper was one of about eight young medical officers selected for the refresher course at the Hygienic Laboratory, forerunner of the National Institutes of Health. Students who were successful in the course and showed an aptitude for research could spend several years or even a career doing scientific research. This appealed to Draper at this point in his life since he had just spent two years traveling extensively, and with a pregnant wife he liked the prospect of settling down in one place for a while. However, this assignment would be short-lived for Draper, for a reason best put into his own words:

There was in the laboratory a large tank of good-sized turtles being used experimentally to test the claims of a commercially minded enthusiast who wanted to market a turtle vaccine to immunize humans against tuberculosis. On rather a dull afternoon my gaze somehow wandered to this turtle cage and I thought what fun it would be to organize a turtle race, whip up some betting and try to make some money. I sold the idea to other members of the class and soon we had chalk lanes mapped out on the floor, a turtle with a number on its back assigned to each member, and were down on our knees, snapping our fingers, and exhorting our respective turtles to hurry up and win the race.

As events transpired, the laboratory director walked in, received a confession from the instigator, and following a short office visit let Draper know that he did not have the spirit for scientific research, and would not be going into that field. While Draper thought this a tragedy at the time, he later looked at it as a great turning point in his career, freeing him for work that would eventually bring him prominence in his profession. Draper was allowed to finish the course, after which one of his older classmates, Dr. Hugh Cumming, was put in charge of a scientific study of shellfish and water pollution. Cumming then put Draper in charge of a small laboratory in Colonial Beach, Virginia, where he spent the next year studying the bacteriological contamination of oysters in the Potomac River. Since both Washington, D.C., and Alexandria, Virginia, dumped their raw sewage into the river, Draper was to answer the question of whether oysters were affected 68 miles downstream. He discovered that the pollution had been neutralized by natural processes much further upstream, and thus had no effect where he ran most of his tests. The study was important to ease fears that pollution might be affecting the extensive oyster beds near Point Lookout, Maryland, much further downstream.

Following his year at Colonial Beach, Draper returned to the headquarters of the Public Health Service in Washington, D.C., and became the assistant to the Chief of Scientific Research., Dr. John W. Kerr, in the Surgeon General's office. Here he helped in the administration of scientific research programs and the Hygienic Laboratory. During this time, Draper participated in a study in Fulton County, Georgia, designed to both improve the living conditions of convicts while simultaneously reducing the per capita cost of maintaining them. He co-authored a pamphlet on this study published by the U.S. Department of Agriculture in 1918.

=== World War I ===
Dr. Draper during World War I

When World War I broke out, Draper was assigned as an officer with the U. S. Army and was put in charge of sanitation at Camp Lee, Virginia. He worked closely with the local Health Department, primarily on the two biggest health issues involving the troops: venereal diseases and typhoid fever, both great menaces in 1917. While working at Camp Lee, Draper lived in a boarding house in Petersburg with his wife and young son.

His tenure at Camp Lee was short, and he was soon called to undertake similar work at the port in Newport News, Virginia, where troops embarked for the war in Europe. He was primarily brought in to help resolve a management situation involving health service personnel, and with his easy-going manner but competent management skills was able to get things working smoothly, bringing praises from headquarters in Washington. Again, Draper's service in Newport News was shortened when influenza broke out in New England, and he was put in charge of relief efforts there. This outbreak of the flu became global in scope and developed into one of the deadliest natural disasters in human history, giving Draper a great respect for the disease. He at first worked in Boston and sometimes sat in on the staff meetings of Massachusetts Governor Calvin Coolidge when an update on the flu situation was needed.

Without the availability of antibiotics at the time, medical personnel found that it was beneficial to get the flu victims out of crowded hospitals, where many of them would die, and into tents where they would get a lot more fresh air. According to Draper, "if we could bed [the patients] down in tents which were furnished by the National Guard, more of them lived. If we got them into bed in the early stages of the disease the chances of living were far better. If they stayed around for two or three days, and finally went to bed, because they couldn't do anything else—they would very likely die."

While in Massachusetts, Draper worked out of the State House in Boston, and had several regional directors working under his overall supervision. Members of his staff came from a variety of sources, including the Public Health Service, the Hygienic Laboratory, and the American Red Cross. He assigned different members of his staff to the areas with the greatest need, and during the epidemic he also worked in different locations including Connecticut, Rhode Island, and Pennsylvania. One night during his time in Harrisburg, Pennsylvania, Draper was awakened in the middle of the night by raucous noise from a fire engine, and discovered there was no fire, but rather a celebration stemming from the announcement of the armistice ending the World War.

=== Post war ===
Following the war, Draper was sent back to Washington, D.C., to begin organizing a reserve corps for the Public Health Service. In such a body, medical and scientific personnel could be called to active duty into the health service in time of military necessity or in the event of the widespread outbreak of an epidemic disease. While in this position, Draper became very opinionated about how things should be done, and frequently clashed with his superiors. Dr. Blue, the Surgeon General, eventually removed Draper from this job, and gave him a choice of two other jobs instead. The one chosen by Draper was to work with Dr. Ennion G. Williams, the Virginia State Health Commissioner, to organize county health departments within the Commonwealth of Virginia. Draper became a close friend of Dr. Williams, and made stump speeches all over the state talking to civic groups and any other organization that might be helpful. The program combined federal and state funds with whatever local funding could be obtained to bring a full-time health officer into as many counties as possible.

Draper's tenure in Virginia was so successful that in 1922, when Dr. Hugh Cumming became the Surgeon General, Draper was brought onto his staff and put in charge of the States Relations Division where he would work with the health departments of each state. With only twelve years in the Public Health Service, Dr. Draper was promoted to Assistant Surgeon General, possibly becoming the youngest member of the Public Health Service to reach this position up to that time. Draper became very involved in working with state health departments, and deeply interested in helping states get appropriations from congress to develop county health departments through which better control of disease could be carried on. In a 1963 interview he said "I don't think there was a state health officer that I didn't call by his first name and who didn't call me by my first name too." In September 1926, Draper was assigned as assistant surgeon general in charge of domestic quarantine, continuing to maintain his close ties and collaboration with the various state health departments. In 1949, after Draper's retirement from the Public Health Service, he was given an award of recognition from the Conference of State and Provincial Health Associations of North America for his long and meritorious public health service.

=== Virginia Health Commissioner ===
The only State Commissioner of Health that Virginia had ever known, Dr. Ennion Williams, died in 1931, leaving a large void because of his reputation and influence in other states. Dr. Draper was selected by Governor John Garland Pollard to temporarily fill the vacant position, arousing political ire over the selection of someone from outside the state. The governor, himself irritated by the criticism, had these words to say:

Inasmuch as communicable disease is no respecter of State or party lines, I felt that I had a right to look the country over and appoint the very best man available. That man I found to be Dr. Warren F. Draper, Assistant Surgeon General of the U.S. Public Health Service, and on the unanimous recommendations of our State Board of Health I have appointed him.

— Governor John G. Pollard

Complaints about Draper being from out of state were hardly valid. Not only was he living in Cherrydale in Arlington County, Virginia, at the time of selection, he had lived in Virginia while doing work at the two military installations during World War I and lived there again after the war while organizing county health departments, residing in Richmond in 1921 when his daughter was born. The governor also pointed out to his critics that specialists in the field of preventive medicine were scarce compared to practicing physicians, and it was not unusual for these specialists to go where there was a demand. Dr. Thomas Parran, from Maryland, for example, was an Assistant Surgeon General in the Public Health Service who was sent to New York to be the state Health Commissioner under Governor Franklin D. Roosevelt.

One of Draper's biggest challenges as the state health commissioner was to get appropriations from state legislatures for public health. He had the worst time trying to get money for the control of venereal diseases because, as he said in a 1963 interview:

the fine men who came from the rural areas and made up the General Assembly...didn't like to hear about things like syphilis and gonorrhea. They just weren't mentioned. Deep in their conscientiousness was the conviction that any person who had overstepped the laws of morality and spiritual righteousness deserved what was coming to them, and to help miscreants out of the troubles visited upon them by God was just something you didn't do.

Draper had to work very carefully in regards to venereal disease control, but other aspects of his tenure as Virginia's health commissioner worked very smoothly. The state kept a close liaison with the Hygienic Laboratory when problems arose which they could not handle, and the laboratory would sometimes send experts down to help them, and at other times Virginia would send its practitioners to the Hygienic Laboratory for some brushing up or further training. Draper's time as Virginia's Health Commissioner ended in 1934 when he returned to the headquarters of the Public Health Service. One of the big initiatives within this organization in the next two years, spearheaded by Dr. Parran, was to bring the plight of venereal diseases into the public domain where it could be discussed and handled openly. A humorous outcome of this occurred when Draper was selected to speak to a woman's organization, and he called the secretary of the group ahead of time to find out if he could discuss venereal diseases. The secretary responded, "...indeed! We want you to discuss them. You know, you in the Public Health Service have made syphilis respectable."

=== World War II ===
With one four-year term behind him, Franklin Roosevelt had just been elected to his second term as the President of the United States in 1936. The same year he selected Dr. Thomas Parran to be the Surgeon General of the United States. Three years later, in 1939, Draper was selected as the Deputy Surgeon General, a position he would hold until his retirement in 1947, working under Dr. Parran for the entire duration. The division within the Surgeon General's headquarters responsible for liaison with the states, where Draper had been in charge, was then turned over to Dr. Joseph Walter Mountin.

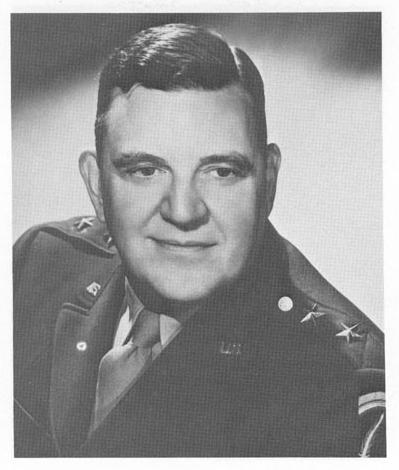
Major General Warren F. Draper in Army uniform during World War II

As the Second World War progressed in Europe from 1939 to 1941, the direct involvement of the United States appeared imminent. While isolationists clamored against U.S. involvement, the attack on Pearl Harbor in December 1941 put an end to such sentiments, and the subsequent declaration of war against the United States by Germany and Italy allowed for a clean entry by the Americans into the European Theater. Planning for the invasion of Europe began almost immediately, but the organization of the invasion force did not materialize until early in 1944. On January 15 of that year the Supreme Headquarters Allied Expeditionary Force (SHAEF) was created with the mission to invade Europe and destroy the German armed forces.

Reports from Europe indicated that the public health situation was dire, and that prompt action was imperative. A highly qualified medical officer was needed to direct the Public Health Division of the Civil Affairs Branch (G-5) of the newly formed headquarters. Because all of the senior Army medical officers with competence in this field were already holding highly important positions, the Army turned to Dr. Parran, the Surgeon General of the Public Health Service, who agreed to release his deputy, Dr. Draper, for assignment to SHAEF. On April 26, 1944, Draper became a member of General Dwight Eisenhower's staff as the Chief of the Public Health Branch and the top public health adviser for SHAEF with the rank of brigadier general. He reported with his new assistant, Colonel William Wilson, to London on May 8, 1944, and in less than two months, on July 1, 1944, he was promoted to major general.

The G-5 (Civil Affairs) branch had been established to handle the urgent issues created by the war on civilian populations. The European populace became overrun so fast by invading armies that the destruction and disruption of civilian life and institutions became great enough to impede the progress of the fighting forces. The primary objective of the G-5 was to further military effort by meeting emergency needs and maintaining civilian institutions. General Draper would have an integral role in meeting this objective, using a staff which included competent specialists in the fields of communicable disease control, nutrition, sanitary engineering, public health nursing, narcotic drugs control, veterinary disease control, and general health inspection. Some of the specific health situations faced by General Draper and his staff were venereal disease, typhus brought about by louse infestations, typhoid fever, malnutrition, and the generally horrific living conditions endured by refugees and many people living under German occupation.

While Draper would receive recognition for his handling of health issues in Europe during the ensuing year, things did not always go smoothly. The Public Health Branch was an advisory agency, but sometimes acted as an operating body, resulting in some misunderstandings, and criticism that the branch was sometimes presumptuous in its actions. When public health issues arose, only those that were considered detrimental to the warfighting mission could have resources allocated, and this required some difficult decisions on the part of the public health branch staff.

Upon completing his tour in Europe on June 1, 1945, Draper received a number of awards from different countries. He was made an "Honorary Companion of the Bath" by order of his majesty, King George VI of the United Kingdom, with the award presented at a ceremony in London by Air Marshall Sir Arthur Tedder. Other awards he received for his service were the Croix de Guerre with palm from France, the Grand Officer Order of Orange-Nassau from the Netherlands, and the Grand Officer Order of Leopold II from Belgium. From the United States Draper received the Distinguished Service Medal, which citation reads as follows:

[Major General Warren F. Draper] served with conspicuous distinction as Chief of the Public Health Branch....He directed the formulation and execution of the Supreme Commander's policies governing public health in liberated nations and conquered territories. Drawing on his many years' experience, he coordinated all resources for the prevention and control of civilian epidemics which might have interfered with military operations, and successfully met tremendous problems caused by the chaotic conditions left by the war in many areas. The plans and procedures drawn up by General Draper were successful in every test. Through controlling disease in Europe, he contributed in the highest degree to the success of the Allied forces.

After returning to the United States in 1945, Draper resumed his post as deputy surgeon general, U.S. Public Health Service, in Bethesda, Maryland. He remained in this position until his retirement in 1947, when he became briefly employed by the American Red Cross as assistant vice president for health services.

== United Mine Workers ==
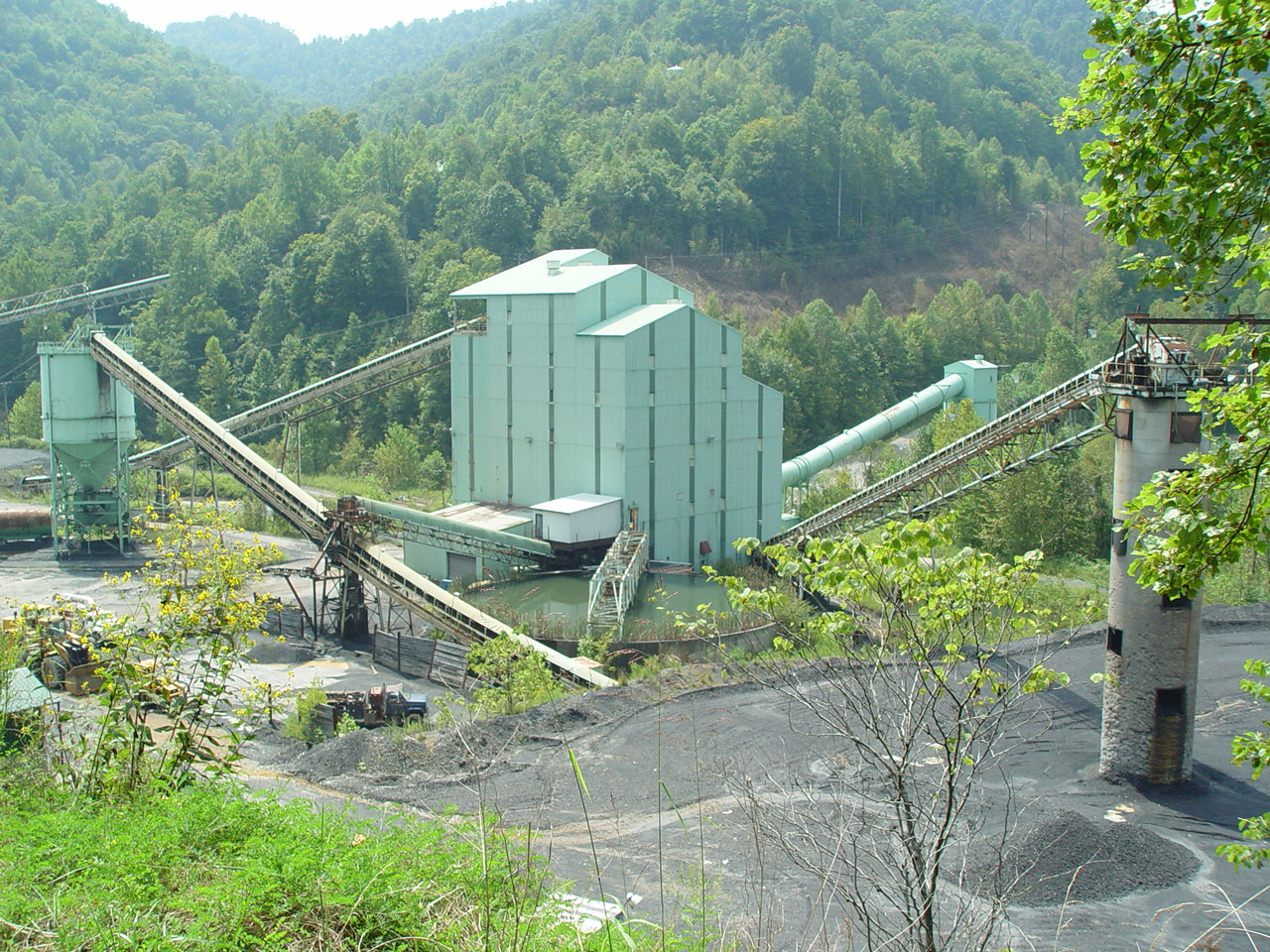
Coal mining operation in Kentucky

Following his career with the Public Health Service, Draper went to work for the Health Services Division of the American Red Cross. They had a mandatory retirement age of 65, so when he reached this age in 1948 he planned to become a volunteer there. However, he was soon contacted by the United Mine Workers of America, and accepted an offer to help them administer a new welfare and retirement fund. He was brought on as the executive medical officer of this fund's medical care program, and was given the daunting task of planning and directing health care for nearly one and a half million miners and their family members. A guiding principle of the program was that development and operation of the medical programs rested in the hands of medical professionals, as opposed to non-medical administrators.

While the fund used existing hospitals to the maximum extent possible, in many mining areas there were no hospitals within reasonable distance of the coal mines, and medical services to coalminers tended to be of inferior quality in those areas. The fund at first paid fees to doctors, but the question of unnecessary and incompetent surgery soon arose publicly. Draper wrote in 1953, "As there were no indications that the deplorable conditions of the past would not extend indefinitely into the future, the fund had no other recourse than to arrange for the establishment of new hospitals in some of the areas in which [the] most desperate need existed." This need led to the establishment of the Memorial Hospital Associations of Kentucky, Virginia and West Virginia, and the building of ten new hospitals. These associations were non-profit organizations established in accordance with the respective laws of the individual states, and were financed through a production royalty on coal tonnage.

While criticisms were launched at the plan as being socialized medicine, John L. Lewis, the President of the United Mine Workers had this to say:

This plan of the United Mine Workers is not socialized medicine. This plan contemplates the purchase of the services of the medical profession and establishes the best possible service at a fair and just cost. That is free enterprise. That is not socialized medicine. And in this work, more and more as the days go by, the eminent figures in the American medical world are coming to understand more and more the value of this great arrangement in our industry and more and more are extending their cooperation and their helpfulness to make it the most successful of any plan in the country.

— John L. Lewis

The program had both its merits and its downsides. On the positive side, in the field of rehabilitation alone, thousands of crippled miners had been restored to usefulness and re-employment. Dr. Draper wrote in a 1953 article, "the arduous, costly task of restoring men with crushed limbs and backs in the terrible toll of the coal mines is one of the finest chapters in the history of medicine." On the negative side, with a program of this extent there were physicians who were not competent to provide the quality of service needed, and those who rendered needless or poorly advised services. Some physicians had a monopoly on certain services in certain areas and charged exorbitant fees, while others took advantage of emergency situations, charging coal miners rates that they would charge their wealthiest clients. Nevertheless, Draper wrote in 1953, the physicians associated with the fund had done a great amount to improve the standard of medical practice in coal mining areas. Overall, the program was considered to be a success; so successful, in fact, that in 1956 it was given the Albert Lasker Group Award. While the fund continued to serve miners for decades to come, it was forced to give up its hospitals in 1964 from rising costs that it could no longer control.

In an article that Draper wrote in the Military Surgeon in 1948 he stated, "I could not know, of course, that the climax of my career was to come in the form of a request from the War Department to serve in World War II as Chief of Public Health on General Eisenhower's staff in the European Theatre of Operations." In 1968 Dr. David Goldstein modified this notion by writing, "He did not know then, of course, that perhaps his greatest contribution in the course of his professional career was in his role as Executive Medical Officer, Welfare and Retirement Fund, United Mine Workers of America..."

Dr. Draper continued to manage the medical program of the UMW's Welfare and Retirement Fund until retiring from that role in 1969 when he was 86 years old. He continued his affiliation with the union, however, as the special assistant in the newly formed Department of Occupational Health until his death the following year.

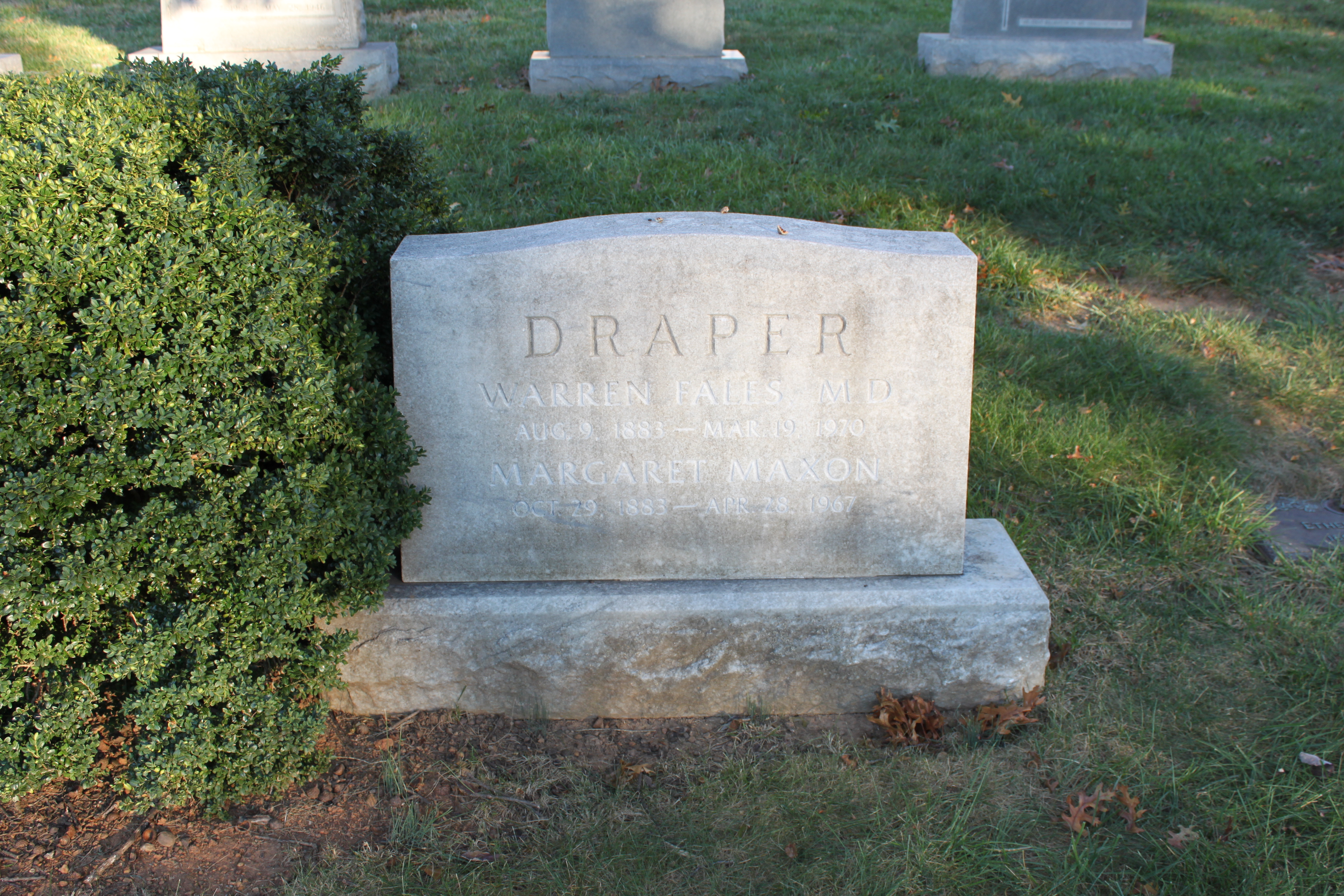
Grave of Draper and his wife in Columbia Gardens Cemetery

He died on March 19, 1970, at the George Washington University Medical Center in Washington, D.C., and was buried next to his wife and near his son at Columbia Gardens Cemetery in Arlington County, Virginia.

== Professional and personal impact ==
During his career, Dr. Draper was a frequent lecturer at a number of universities, including George Washington University, Jefferson Medical College, the University of Michigan, and Johns Hopkins University. He was a member of the House of Delegates of the American Medical Association from 1925 to 1946 and a member of the National Board of Medical Examiners from 1942 to 1948. He was the president of the Washington Academy of Medicine, Washington, D.C., and a president and life member of the Association of Military Surgeons. Draper received a doctor of science degree from Amherst College in 1946. He wrote 61 articles concerning public health administration and preventive medicine, co-authored several books and pamphlets, and had twenty speeches reprinted.

In 1956, eight years after Dr. Draper became the Executive Medical Officer of the United Mine Workers Welfare and Retirement fund, this medical care program was honored with the Albert Lasker Group Award, being recognized as a model program of health services to a million and a half mine workers and their families. In 1965 the American Medical Association Council on Occupational Health presented a citation to Dr. Draper "in recognition of his devotion and tireless efforts ... in promoting the health of all working people."

Dr. Draper's writings and speeches reveal a man of great character and humor. In introducing Draper as the keynote speaker at the annual conference of the Ramazzini Society in 1967, Dr. David Goldstein wrote, "His personal warmth, his compassion, his delightful sense of humor, his deep qualities of humility and humanity add to his stature as a scientist and a man of outstanding professional performance, and characterize him as one of the finest human beings I have ever known."

== Awards and decorations ==
Dr. Draper received the following awards for his service on General Eisenhower's staff during World War II:

Distinguished Service Medal (United States)
Honorary Companion of the Order of the Bath (Great Britain)
Croix de Guerre with palm (France)
Officer of the Order of Leopold (Belgium)
Grand Officer of the Order of Orange-Nassau (Netherlands) (25 September 1945)

In addition to the above awards, Dr. Draper's Medical Care Program with the United Mine Workers was given the Albert Lasker Group Award in 1956, eight years after Draper became the executive medical officer for the program.

== Children ==
Warren and Margaret Draper had two children. Their first, Warren Fales Draper Jr., was born in Washington, D.C., on March 8, 1913, and was married in Syracuse, New York, in April 1941 to Edwyna Louise Davis, born in Syracuse on January 7, 1917, the daughter of Edward Stephen and Louise Catherine (Ecker) Davis. Warren received an undergraduate degree in English literature from Amherst College in 1935 and a Doctor of Medicine degree from George Washington University four years later. He worked for the U.S. Public Health Service until his death in Washington, D.C., in May 1943 from a brain tumor, and is buried in Columbia Gardens Cemetery, Arlington County, Virginia. He and his wife had one son born after his death.

The second child, Anne Gansevoort Draper, was born in Richmond, Virginia, on August 17, 1921, and received a degree in Economics from Smith College, Northampton, Massachusetts, in 1943. She worked as an economist for the National War Labor Board, the Office of Price Administration, the Social Security Administration, and finally for the American Federation of Labor-Congress of Industrial Organizations (AFL-CIO) until her retirement in the late 1990s. She did not marry, and lived with her parents, continuing to occupy their house at 4710 25th Street in Arlington County after they died, until her own death on March 3, 2001. She is buried in Columbia Gardens Cemetery in Arlington near her brother and parents.

== Ancestry of Warren Fales Draper ==
In addition to being descended from James Draper, Dr. Draper is also a descendant of early Massachusetts military leader Humphrey Atherton, and early New Hampshire settler and elder William Wentworth.

Ancestors of Warren Fales Draper

16. Daniel Draper (1763–1834)
8. Martin Draper (1797–1879)
17. Naomah Dean (1774–1833)
4. Daniel Fisher Draper (1822–1874)
18. Elijah Fisher (1765–1813)
9. Sally Fisher (1799–1885)
19. Mehitabel Wentworth Fadden (1781–1808)
2. William Burgess Draper (1852–1939)
10. Barnard Collins (1776-1839)
5. Mary Ann Collins (1817–1889)
22. Josiah Martin (1761 – c. 1797)
11. Hannah Martin (1786-1826)
23. Hannah Stiles (1765-1835)
1. Warren Fales Draper (1883–1970)
24. John Drew (1740–1825)
12. Thomas Drew (1781–1854)
25. Jane Scruton (1747–1812)
6. Edwin A. Drew (1831–1910)
26. Enoch Wood (1759–1836)
13. Sophronia Wood (1796–1862)
27. Olive Perley (1769–1858)
3. Carrie Marie Drew (1856–1924)
28. Jesse Shepard (1769–1824)
14. Moses Shepard (1802–1860)
29. Hannah Page (1770–1813)
7. Phebe Almanza Shepard (1833–1922)
30. Enoch Dow (born 1773)
15. Phebe Dow (1802–1874)
31. Phebe Butterfield (1776–1854)

== See also ==
- Surgeon General of the United States
- Public Health Service Commissioned Corps
