= William Wentworth (elder) =

English settler (1616–1696/97)

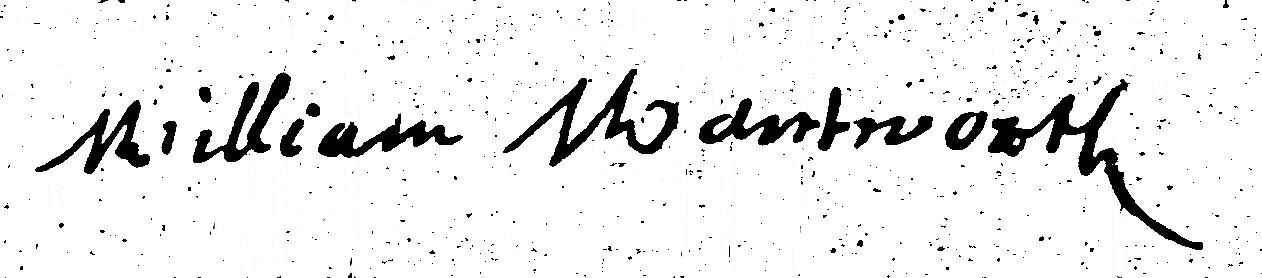
- Born: baptized 15 March 1615/16; Alford, Lincolnshire, England
- Died: 15 March 1696/7; Dover, New Hampshire
- Other name: Elder William Wentworth
- Education: signed his name to documents
- Occupations: Sawmill proprietor, church elder
- Spouse(s): (1) name unknown (2) Elizabeth Knight
- Children: Samuel, John, Gershom, Ezekiel, Elizabeth, Paul, Sylvanus, Timothy, Sarah, Ephraim, Benjamin
- Parent(s): William Wentworth and Susanna Carter

William Wentworth (1616–1696/7) was a follower of John Wheelwright, and an early settler of New Hampshire. Coming from Alford in Lincolnshire, he likely came to New England with Wheelwright in 1636, but no records are found of him in Boston. When Wheelwright was banished from the Massachusetts Bay Colony for his role in the Antinomian Controversy, he established the settlement of Exeter, New Hampshire, and Wentworth followed him there and then to Wells, Maine. After Wheelwright left Wells for Hampton, New Hampshire, Wentworth went to Dover, New Hampshire, and that was where he lived the remainder of his life. He was the proprietor of a sawmill, and held several town offices, but is most noted for being an elder in his Dover church for nearly 40 years. He had 11 children with two wives, and numerous descendants, including many of great prominence.

== Life ==
Coat of Arms of William Wentworth

Baptized on 15 March 1615/16 in Alford, Lincolnshire, England, William Wentworth was the son of William Wentworth and Susanna Carter. His paternal grandfather was Christopher Wentworth, and his paternal grandmother was Catharine Marbury, who was a sister of Reverend Francis Marbury. Wentworth's father, therefore, was a first cousin of the famed Anne (Marbury) Hutchinson, who, with the Reverend John Wheelwright, was banished in 1637 from Massachusetts for her religious opinions during the Antinomian Controversy. The Marburys, Hutchinsons, Wheelwrights, and Wentworths all came from Alford, or nearby, and family historian John Wentworth deemed it likely that William Wentworth came to Boston in New England with Wheelwright in 1636. However, a contemporary biographer of William Wentworth, Susan Ostberg, is of the opinion that Wentworth arrived in Boston in July 1637 when a group of men arrived from Lincolnshire, including Anne Hutchinson's "brother" (actually her brother-in-law, Samuel Hutchinson). The uncertainty stems from the fact that Wentworth left behind no records in Boston.

Wheelwright and Anne Hutchinson held religious opinions at odds with the established ministers of the Massachusetts Bay Colony, and at the November 1637 meeting of the General Court, Wheelwright was ordered to depart within 14 days. He went to the Piscataqua River, establishing the town of Exeter, New Hampshire, with a group of his followers, one of whom was Wentworth. The men, including Wentworth, signed an agreement for a government known as the Exeter Combination. The land on which Exeter sat was claimed by Massachusetts, which by 1642 began to exercise that claim. This compelled Wheelwright to move once again, this time to Wells in the Province of Maine, and Wentworth once again went with him.

Wentworth lived in Wells from 1642 to 1649. In 1642 he was a juror there, in 1648 he was named as a constable, and again in 1647 and 1649 he sat on a jury. In 1646 Wheelwright left Wells for Hampton, New Hampshire, but Wentworth stayed a few years beyond that, until late 1649, when he made his final move to Dover, New Hampshire. He settled in the central part of the town that was given the name Cochecho, after an earlier trading post that had been established there at Cochecho Falls. Here Wentworth was a co-owner of a sawmill, and also served in a variety of town offices, such as selectman, commissioner, and lot-layer. He owned 600-1000 acres that he and his sons farmed.

He was a "Ruling Elder" of his church in Dover, a position that he held for nearly 40 years. He was not in the clergy, but as an elder he often preached, and sometimes preached in other churches, including one in Exeter.

== Cochecho Massacre ==
One incident for which Wentworth is well known occurred late in his life. There had been an Indian attack in his home village of Cochecho in 1689, and most of the garrisons in the town were attacked and burned.

When the Heard Garrison was attacked, Wentworth closed the door on the attackers, and held it closed until help arrived by sitting and bracing himself against the stairs with his shoes up against the door. Two bullets went through the door, but missed him. He was 73 at the time, and this was the only garrison of five that was saved. In the attack, 23 settlers were killed and another 29 were taken captive.

Wentworth died on his baptismal date, 15 March 1696/7. He left no will, but had already divided most of his property among his children.

== Family and descendants ==
William Wentworth married twice. His first wife is reputed by some sources to be Elizabeth, the daughter of William and Elizabeth Quiney (or Kenney) of Stratford-Upon-Avon, England, but no reference has been provided. This wife was the mother of many of Wentworth's older children. Wentworth's second wife was Elizabeth Knight, and she is thought to be the mother of several of Wentworth's younger children. Other sources say Knight was either his first wife, or the wife of his son Ezekiel, while Kenney was the second wife.

Wentworth is notable for the large number of his descendants who reached great prominence in the American colonies and in the United States. His grandson John Wentworth was the Lieutenant Governor of the Province of New Hampshire at a time when the governor was also the governor of Massachusetts. New Hampshire governors Benning Wentworth and Sir John Wentworth are also descendants, as were Judge John Wentworth and his son John Wentworth Jr., a New Hampshire representative to the Continental Congress. Chicago mayor and U.S. Representative John Wentworth was not only a descendant of Elder William, but compiled the extensive genealogy on the Wentworth family, considered one of the best family histories ever written. Sarah Wentworth Apthorp Morton, a great-great granddaughter, was a noted poet; among her works was "Invocation to the shades of My Ancestors Wentworth and Apthorp". Other descendants include the founder of the Wentworth Military Academy, Stephen G. Wentworth; noted publisher and philanthropist Warren Fales Draper; and Deputy Surgeon General Warren Fales Draper, who was a member of General Dwight Eisenhower's staff in Europe during World War II. Erastus Wentworth, a seventh generation descendant, was a prominent missionary in China. The namesake of the T. T. Wentworth Jr. Florida State Museum and Adelaide Wentworth Waldron, the wife of aviator John C. Waldron, were also descendants.
