= Westerly Burial Ground =

Historic cemetery in Massachusetts, United States

- U.S. National Register of Historic Places
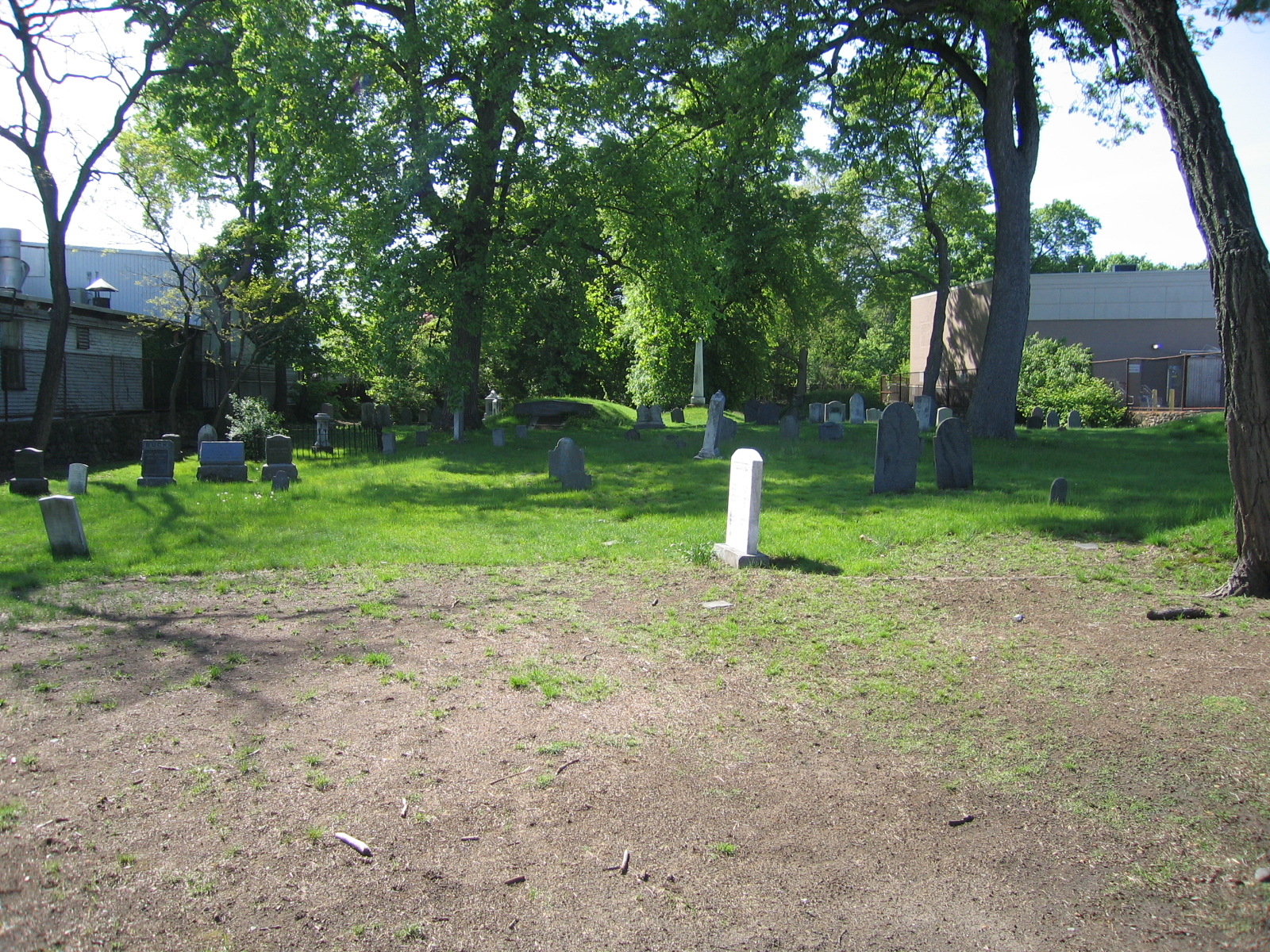
- Location: West Roxbury, Massachusetts
- Coordinates: 42.28144°N 71.15855°W
- Architect: James Foster II, J. N.
- NRHP reference No.: 87001401
- Added to NRHP: November 20, 1987

The Westerly Burial Ground (also known as Westerly Burying Ground) is an historic cemetery on Centre Street in the West Roxbury neighborhood of Boston, Massachusetts.

Established in 1683, it is Boston's seventh-oldest cemetery and where the first settlers of the West Roxbury area are buried. It was enlarged in 1832 and 1844. Its last documented burial was in 1962.

Eight American Revolutionary War veterans are buried there as well as fifteen veterans of the American Civil War.

The cemetery was added to the National Register of Historic Places in 1987.

== See also ==
- List of cemeteries in Boston, Massachusetts
- National Register of Historic Places listings in southern Boston, Massachusetts

== Image gallery ==
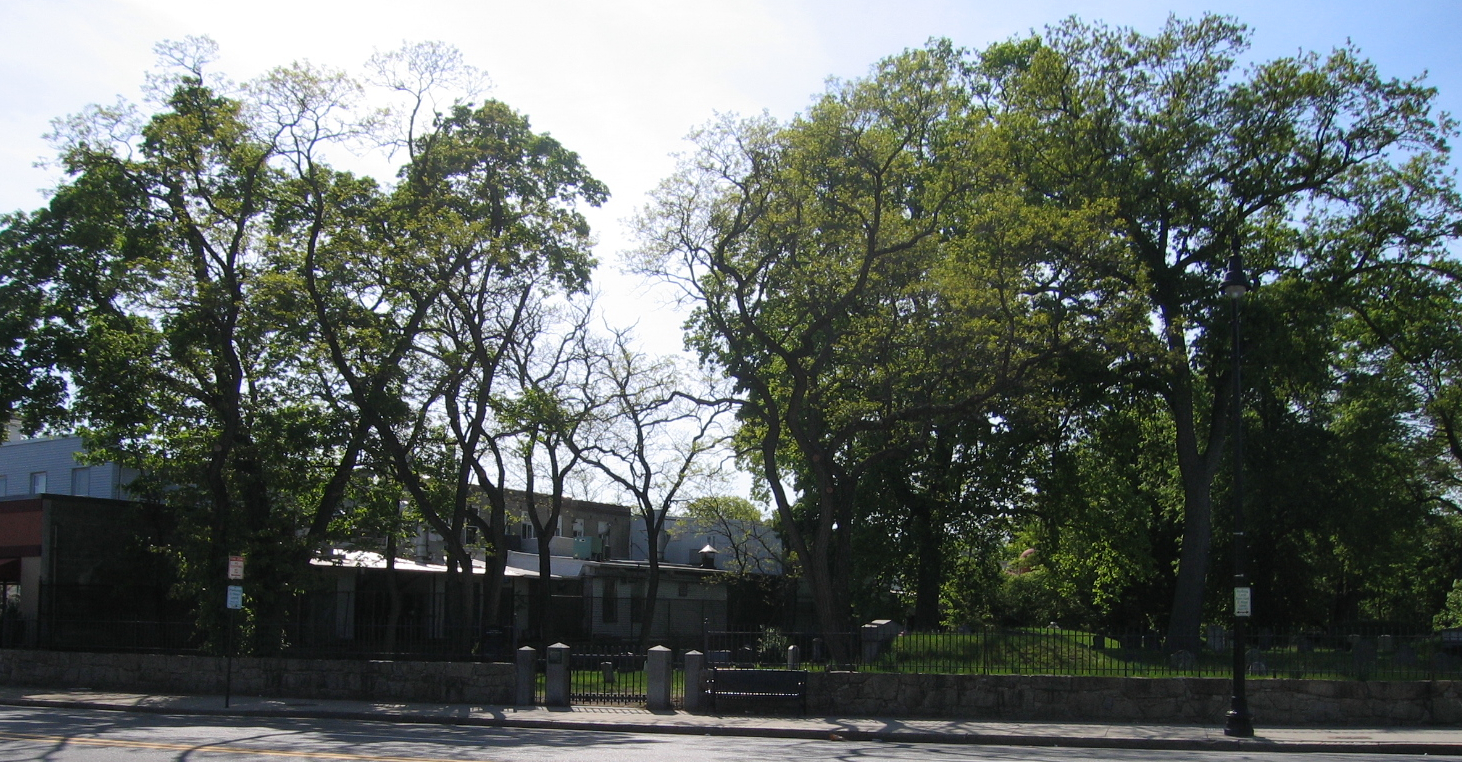
Westerly Burying Ground, general view

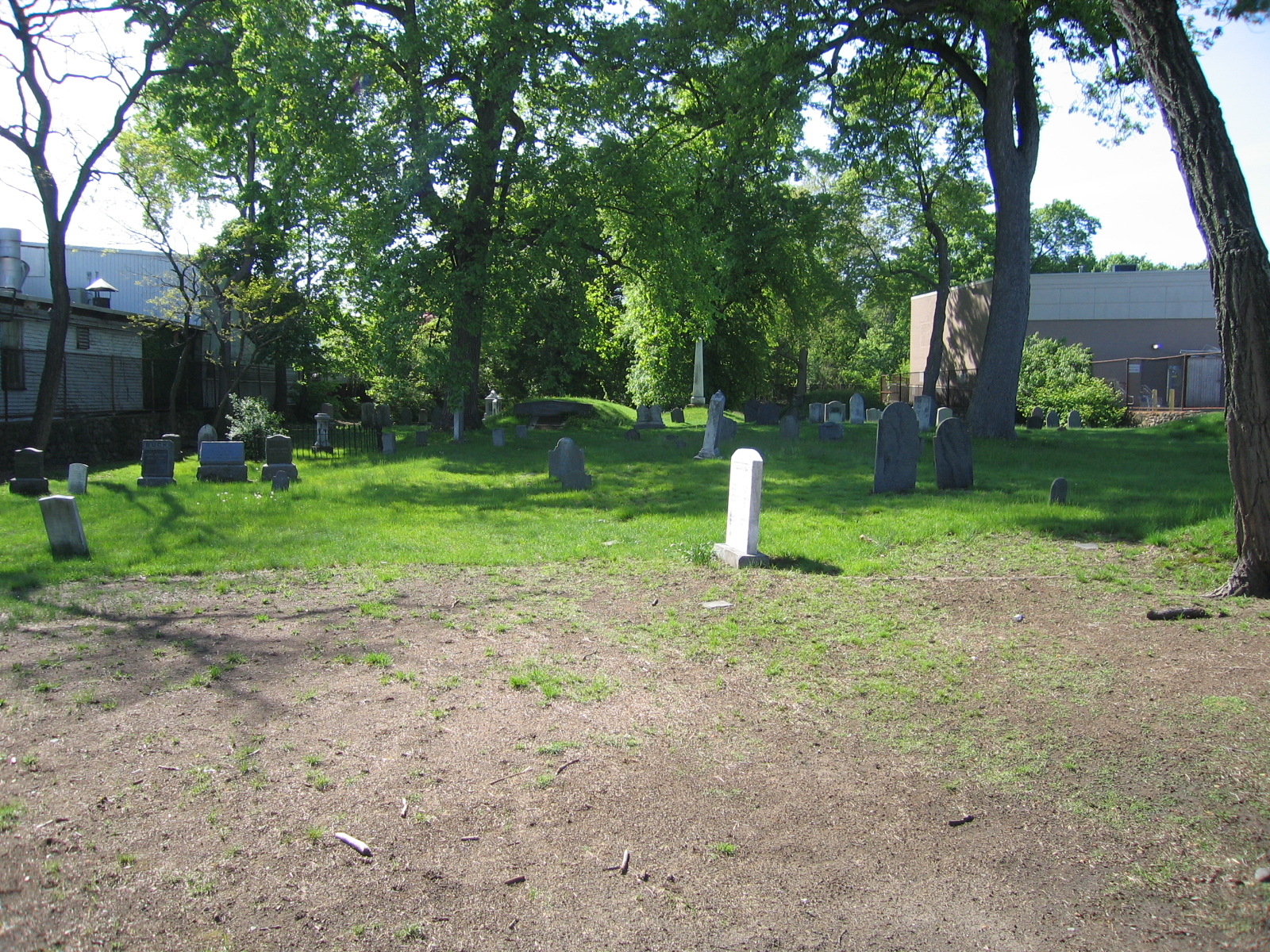
Westerly Burying Ground, close-up 1

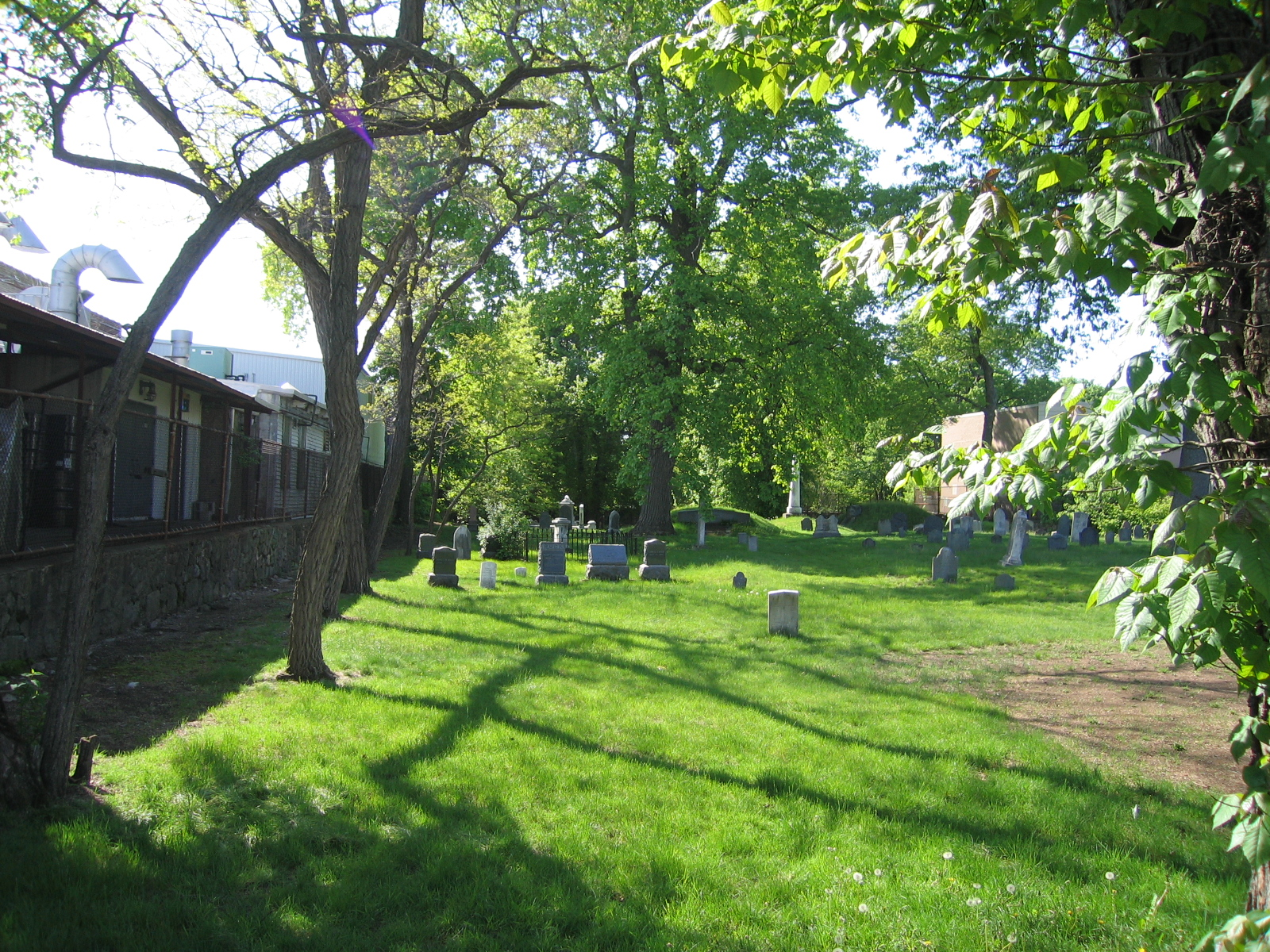
Westerly Burying Ground, close-up 2
