= Ramazzini =

Ramazzini is an Italian surname. Notable people with the surname include:

- Bernardino Ramazzini - Italian physician (1633 – 1714)
  - Collegium Ramazzini academy of occupational and environmental health named after Bernardino
- Álvaro Leonel Ramazzini Imeri - Guatemalan Bishop, born 1947
