= Abbot Academy =

Independent, boarding school in Andover, Massachusetts, United States

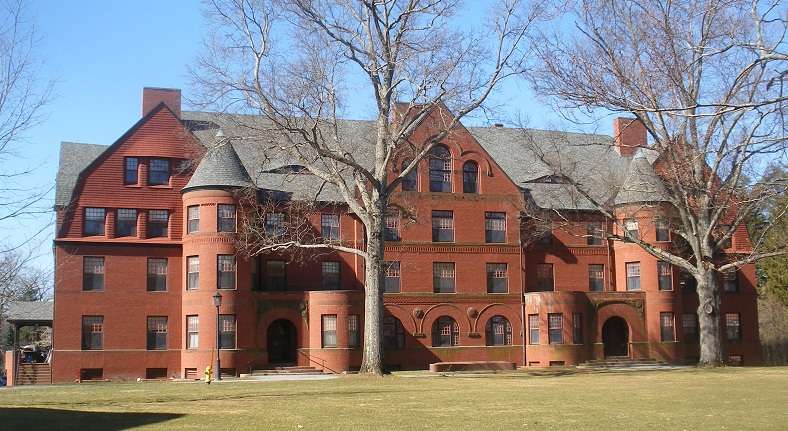

Location
- Andover, Massachusetts; United States; 42.6473°N 71.1323°W

Information
- Type: Independent, Boarding
- Motto: Facem Praetendit Ardentem (She Holds Aloft a Burning Torch)
- Established: 1829
- Closed: 1973 (merged with Phillips Academy)
- Principal: Donald Gordon
- Grades: 9–12
- Gender: Girls
- Average class size: 115 seniors (1973)
- Campus: Suburban
- Colors: Light blue and white
- Nickname: Abbot Rabbits
- Website: www.andover.edu

Abbot Academy (also known as Abbot Female Seminary and AA) was an independent boarding preparatory school for women boarding and day care for students in grades 9–12 from 1828 to 1973. Located in Andover, Massachusetts, Abbot Academy was notable as one of the first incorporated secondary schools for educating young women in New England. It merged with Phillips Academy in 1973 and campus buildings along School Street continue to be used for the combined school. Some Abbot traditions continue at the combined private boarding school such as Parent's Weekend. Since the 40th anniversary in 2013 of the merger of the two schools, there has been renewed interest in Abbot's history and traditions.

== History ==
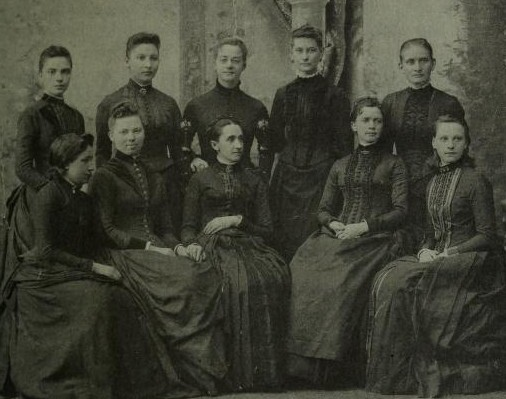
Philena McKeen with graduates in 1880s

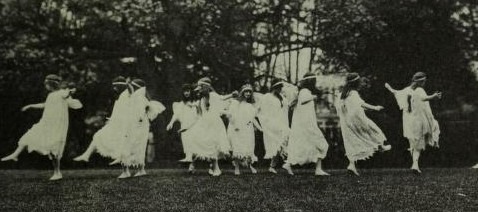
Students performing Masque of the Flowers circa 1874

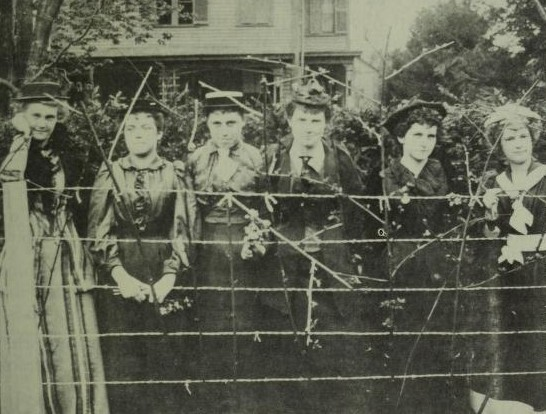
Students behind a fence separating them from Phillips Academy, circa 1874

The school was founded during a time when the prevailing view was that women's education "should always be relative to men", with some believing that study of "higher subjects" such as philosophy and mathematics might render women to be infertile. One of the first formal discussions to propose a school for young women happened on February 19, 1828. The school was incorporated in 1829 with 70 or 85 pupils from eighteen to twenty years of age for the "exclusive work of educating women". According to one source, the official opening day was May 6, 1829.

...to regulate the tempers, to improve the taste, to discipline and enlarge the minds and form the morals of youth...

— Abbot Constitution, 1829

=== The early years ===
The school received financial support from Sarah Abbot who pledged substantial money, which allowed for loans to begin construction; Sarah Abbot died in 1850 and left a substantial sum for educational purposes. After mid-century, Abbot faced several challenges: the addition of a public high school in Andover, followed by the challenges of coping with the American Civil War. In 1853, the first principalship was offered to a woman, and additional monies were raised for the construction of dormitories. In 1859, the "strong-willed" but "ideologically moderate" McKeen sisters — headmistress Philena and Phebe—exerted strong leadership by adopting a "school-home" approach. The years were marked by substantial expansion of buildings. The McKeens fostered the study of French and German and introduced a "systematic oral language program" on a par with that of Harvard University and which "far outdistanced Phillips Academy", which did not offer any modern language instruction until the mid 1870s. Under their "no-nonsense" leadership, teachers stayed longer, many for ten or more years.

Abbot had always promised order, but the McKeen sisters delivered it in spades. They loved schedules. Up at 6:00, breakfast at 6:30, clean your room——and perhaps a teacher's parlor as well. Though four Irish maids also helped out at $1.98 a week, the McKeens considered housework part of education ... Miss McKeen might ask a girl to help her change guest beds, questioning her the while on Butler's Analogy. Between 8:00 and 9:00 a.m. older students often climbed the Hill for a Geology lecture while younger ones did their daily calisthenics, but all must be on hand for the Devotions that formally opened the school day. Before midday dinner everyone wore gym suits with pantaloons, and skirts ten inches from the ground. ... Recitations continued till 3:30, then came Recreation Hours, with time for walking in pairs, studying, mending, croquet, or (after 1886) tennis. Supper followed; the evening was an alternation of study hours, "half-hours" for individual meditation ... and "quarters" for room-to-room visiting. Evening Devotions might mean anything from a hymn sing to a prayerful scolding. Bed at 10:00.

— Susan McIntosh Lloyd, in A Singular School

It was during the late 1800s that the school had a "golden age", according to one view. The campus was visited by Helen Keller and her teacher Anne Sullivan and Amos Bronson Alcott. The leadership of Philena and Phebe McKeen was characterized by substantial fundraising and growth. According to Susan McIntosh Lloyd, Abbot's curriculum "may have surpassed that of Phillips" during these years. After 1910, the only structures built were "gates". The school was like a "family" but commanded by women, in which "women and girls could enjoy one another as persons without self-consciousness or shame".

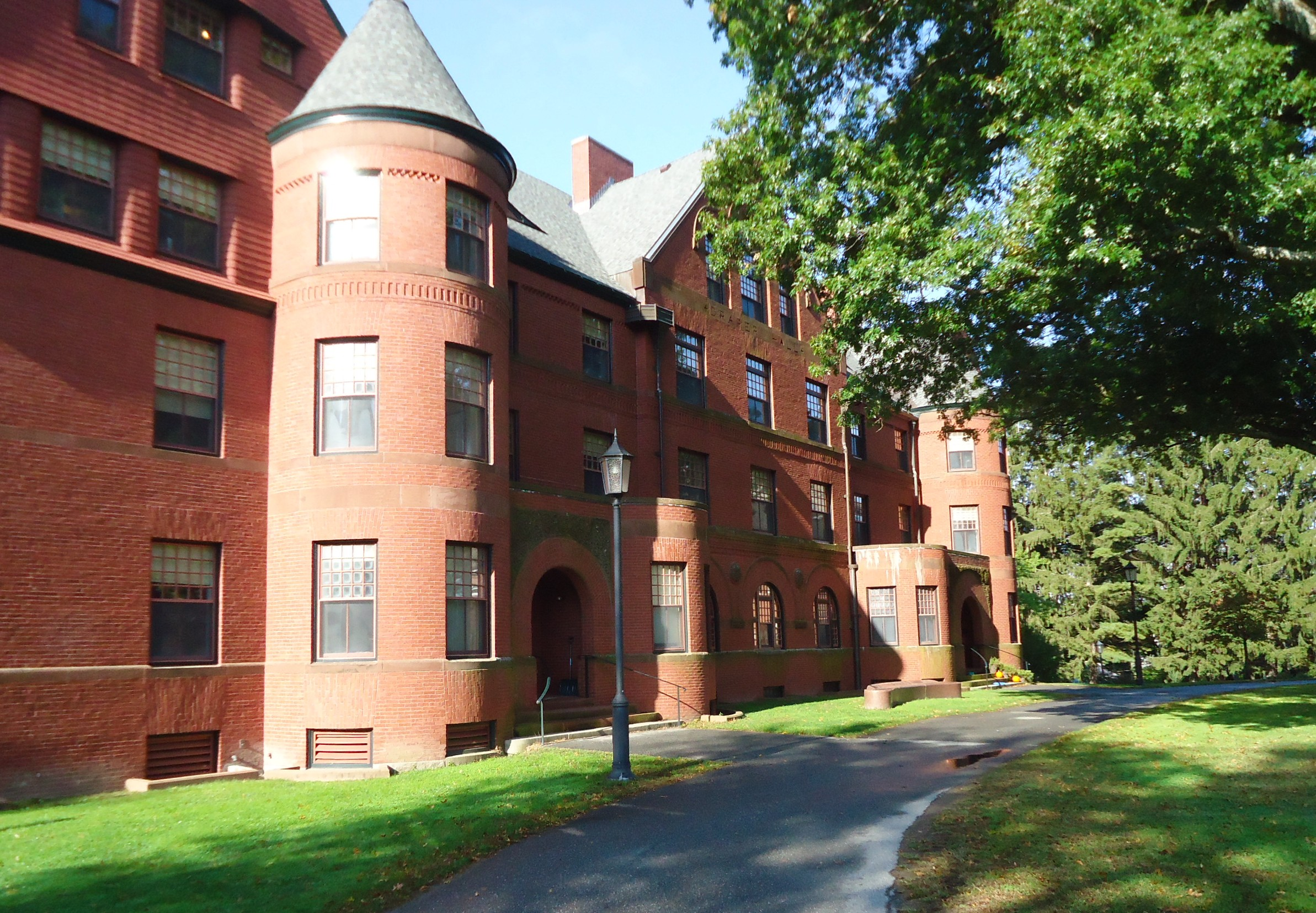
Draper Hall

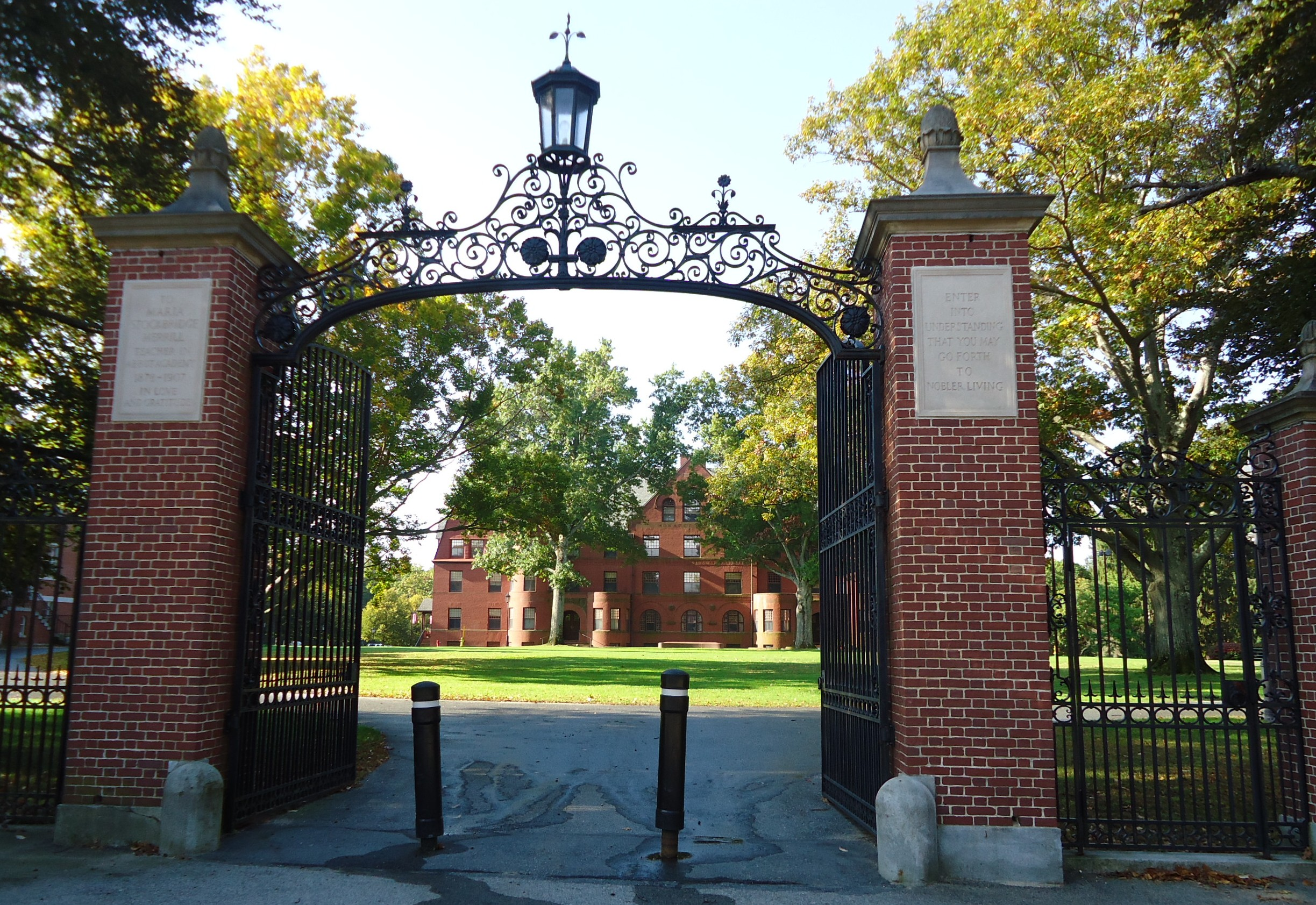
Merrill Memorial Gates (main entrance)

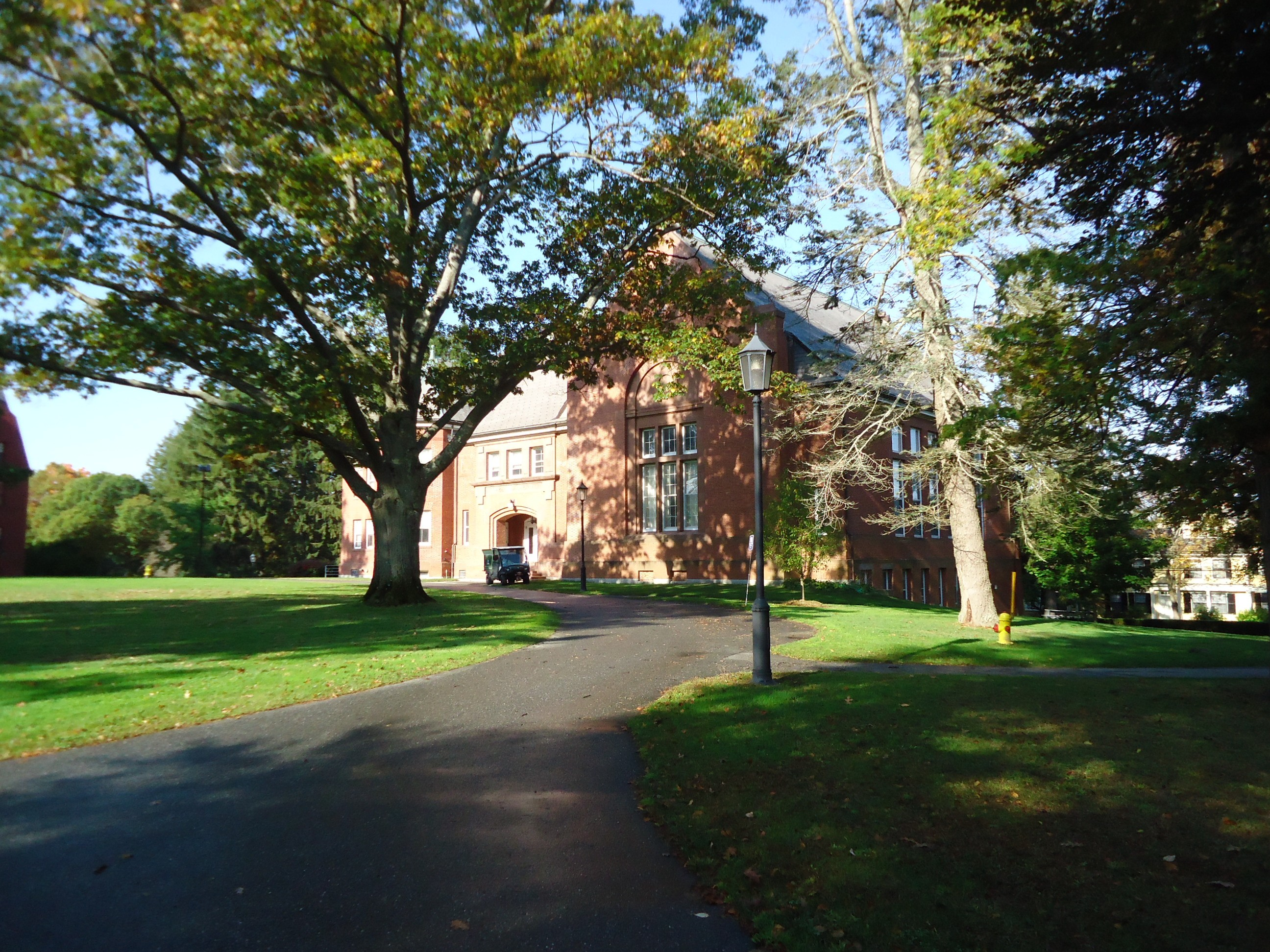
McKeen Memorial and Davis Hall

Abbot's women and girls ... One thinks of Victorian women as confined, and so they were. They could not openly initiate friendship with boys or men; they were expected to hide their interest in sex or to subsume it within coquettish formulae, no matter how interested they really were. Partly because of this relative isolation from men, however, loving, lasting friendships between women could quietly thrive, modeled often on the close mother-daughter or sister-sister relationships that existed apart from men's affairs.

— Susan McIntosh Lloyd, in A Singular School

=== Art education ===
The academy emphasized art education. After starting a small art club in 1871 led by Professor E. A. Park, the academy introduced one of the nation's first History of Art courses in 1873. Painting and drawing were taught by professional painter and alumnus Emily A. Means who had studied with well-known painters in Europe for four years. Means guided the art department from 1877 to 1892 and later served as principal from 1898 to 1911.

=== The 1930s through the 1960s ===
The school went through challenging times during the Great Depression of the 1930s. In the Depression's first five years, the school lost approximately $60,000 annually as well as a sharp drop in its real-estate assets, and the school slipped from having 135 boarders in 1929–30 to 71 boarders in 1933–34. Despite financial concerns, the school continued to dismiss "unruly or lazy students" or those who tucked "dummies into their beds" to spend the night at Phillips Academy. Many other schools folded during the Depression years. During these years, the school taught the "basic college preparatory" program of 3 years of English, 5 years of languages (including 2 or 3 of Latin), 2 or 3 years of mathematics, 1 year of science and 1 year of history, as well as physical education, an "all school choral class" and Bible study of one hour a week, but requirements adjusted over time, largely dictated by preferences of college admissions departments. From World War II and afterwards, the academy experienced increasing enrollment; ten years after the attack on Pearl Harbor, a third of its teachers were either European born or European educated. The school opened its doors more widely to minority groups, such as African American women and Jews.

Academic excellence improved. An alumna, Elizabeth Thomas '49, recalled her Abbot teaching as "the best she has ever had", with college being easier. However, during these years, there was a greater space between teachers and students, such that there were no "out-of-class relationships" between them; teachers seemed "miles away" unless they were enforcing rules about lipstick or patrolling the Phillips campus for errant women or checking mail for return addresses to "certain Phillips boys." Rules forbade smoking and drinking and sexual activity; one 1954 alumna described a "whole system of deception" designed to evade teachers, seen as "the enemy", with deceptions done to get messages to Phillips students, sometimes through day student intermediaries or by messages left in bushes.

Why was the faculty so intent on having the school go on in that crazy old fashioned way? ... Abbot was the only place I'd heard of in 1949 where 1849 was still preserved.

— Elizabeth Marshall, quoted in A Singular School.

However, some students appreciated that the rules cleared "time and space for that peaceful collection of self". Nevertheless, applications to the school increased from the 1950s through the 1960s. During the 1960s, the ratio of applicants to acceptances was three to one. The 1960s featured rules easing somewhat, with more chaperoned dances, more phone calls and dating as well as "cattle-market mixers", but the easing sometimes encouraging girls to find "ways to be still naughtier". Lloyd described the coming changes:

No school is an island: before 1960, every chapter of Abbot's story had been bound in some degree to the realities and dreams of the larger society. ... the old Abbot had made itself a place apart, especially after the McKeen sisters came, and it did its best to remain so through the early 1960s. During the final decade, the outside world beat upon Abbot's doors with such insistence that they must either be opened up or broken down. The Trustees opened them and the world rushed in like a clumsy repairman, knocking over tables and trampling valuable heirlooms, but also bringing fresh air into musty places, and piling on the floor a heap of lumber and tools with which to build anew.

— Susan Lloyd, in A Singular School.

According to Lloyd, Abbot Academy seemed to be a "nineteenth century school" which was stagnant and insular and limited in comparison with the abrupt societal changes made during the 1960s. In 1967, there were greater ties between Phillips Academy and Abbot, including a Phillips-Abbot committee to explore a "wide range of shared activities" between the two schools. Abbot trustee Philip Allen had determined that both schools should merge, but that this was a "hidden agenda"; Allen brought in headmaster Donald Gordon, a graduate of Phillips Academy and Yale, to bring "Abbot up to the point where it could be part of Phillips Academy." Abbot's "old dress code" was abolished for a "neat and clean" requirement. The 1969-70 year was "tumultuous" nationwide, with student revolts on many college campuses and foreign policy failures abroad. The following is a description of Abbot campus life in 1969:

Touch football players romped on the sacred Circle. Not a saddle shoe was to be seen; indeed, one boy and two girls played with no shoes at all, in spite of November. Two pairs of faded blue jeans wandered by, one belted in macrame and filled by a man of bristling beard; he was discussing English papers with the other.

— Susan Lloyd in A Singular School

=== The 1973 merger ===
The late 1960s and early 1970s was marked by the merger between the two schools. The merger was brought about by many factors, including the sense of shared history and goals between the two schools, common activities, plus survey research showing that 94% of students in northeastern secondary schools wished for coeducation. The times "favored coeducation"; in 1968, 53 colleges and universities either became coeducational or began coordinate instruction. While Phillips Academy "held the cards" regarding whether the two schools should merge, there was a "crasser impetus" from admissions statistics, as Phillips was increasingly being turned down by applicants preferring newly-coeducational competitors such as St. Paul's, Taft, Northfield-Mount Hermon, and Exeter. Many committee meetings, including discussions between administrators and teachers, happened over a sixteen-month period. The Phillips headmaster, John Kemper, who had kinship ties with women graduates of Abbot, felt a merger was "practical, ethical, and educationally sound", although several times the Phillips Board of Trustees refused to sanction a merger. The school merged with Phillips Academy on June 28, 1973. Many Abbot traditions were included in the combined school, such as having a designated weekend in the fall for parents to visit.

Parents’ Weekend was Abbot’s response to formalize parent visits to the school. In the past, parents would visit the school on many different occasions. The event created one specific weekend for all parents to visit.

— Tim Sprattler, 2009

After the merger, $1 million of Abbot's endowment became the basis for the Abbot Academy Association, which funds various educational programs and projects submitted by students, faculty, and staff. Since the first Abbot Grant was awarded in the fall of 1973, nearly 2000 Abbot Grant proposals have been submitted by students and members of the faculty, staff and administration of Phillips Academy. The Abbot Academy Association has funded more than 1400 of these proposals with grants totaling $9,400,000. In 2014, the Abbot Academy Association's endowment had grown to $10 million.

== Campus life ==
Activities included the Fidelio Chorus, school government, and the school newspaper. Athletic programs included basketball, crew, cycling, ballet and modern dance, fencing, soccer, softball, and tennis. In the late 1960s, Abbot's math department set up a paper-tape terminal connected to a computer at Merrimack College in North Andover, Massachusetts. This provided the high school students with early BASIC-language computer programming skills. In 1973, the languages taught included English, French, German, Latin, Russian, and Spanish.

=== Academic prizes ===
Abbot was a chapter member of the Cum Laude Honor Society. The school awarded the following student prizes annually:

- Anna Dawes Prize for History
- Betsy Waskowitz Rider Art Award
- Beatrice Farnsworth Powers Art Award
- Priscilla Bradley Prize for Art
- Pam Weidenman Prize for Art
- Ceramics Prize
- Photography Prize
- Music Department Award
- Kate Friskin Award for Music
- Mathematics Department Prize
- Science Prize
- Spanish Department Prize
- English Department Prize
- Latin Department Prize
- Ballet Prize
- Abbot Athletic Award
- Isabel Hancock Award

The Madame Sarah Abbot award was established through a gift from the Abbot Class of 1973. The award is given to a female Phillips Academy senior who " ... best exemplifies 'strong character, effective leadership and outstanding scholarship.'"

=== School publications ===
In June 1873, the first issue of the Abbot Courant was published. This student literary magazine appeared two to three times a year. Later editions included art work and photographs. In 1992, with a grant from the Abbot Academy Association, the Courant was revived at Phillips Academy and continues to be published twice a year. In 2002, a 123-page alumni edition was published. The Abbot Academy yearbook was published from 1900 to 1973. Originally known as The Abbot Academy Class Book, the yearbook became The Circle in 1916 (this is the first year that the double-A logo used on senior class rings appeared on the book cover). Digital versions of the Abbot Courant and The Circle are available through the school Archives and Special Collections.

The student newspaper was called Cynosure. In 1974, it moved to Phillips where it became a monthly magazine.

== Traditions ==
Students were divided into two groups called Gargoyles and Griffins for sports teams and for other purposes that required dividing the students into groups; their colors were green and orange, respectively. Dual-color felt beanie hats with an image of a gargoyle or griffin were distributed to students.

The locally based Clan MacPherson Pipes and Drums led graduation processions on the Abbot Circle. This tradition continues today at Phillips Academy. At graduation, after chapel, Seniors and Junior Middlers (eleventh graders) met in the Senior Courtyard for the Ring Ceremony. (This central garden was completely enclosed by the three sides of Draper Hall with the dining room wall as the fourth side.) By tradition, Junior Mids who purchased Abbot Academy class rings the year before wore them with the "AA" insignia upside-down. During the Ring Ceremony, each Junior Mid received a Senior sponsor. The Junior Mid, now recognized as a member of the new Senior class, turned her ring so that the insignia was upright. In 1973, all students who wanted to were allowed to buy Abbot class rings.

== Buildings and campus ==
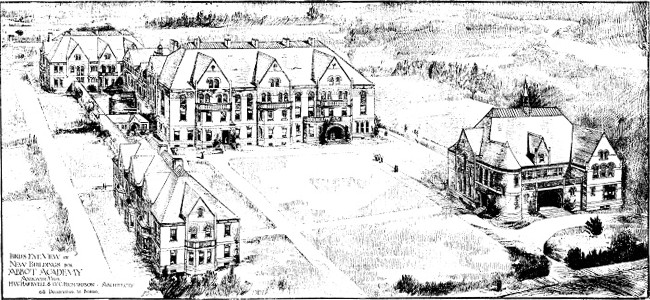
The campus had three main buildings grouped around a circle, plus a gymnasium, a laundry, and several dormitories. The largest building was Draper Hall. This is the partially implemented 1886 plan by architects Hartwell and Richardson.

In 1863, the Abbot campus consisted of one acre surrounded by a fence. By 1878, it was approximately 22 acres. Abbot's three main buildings (Abbot Hall, Draper Hall, and McKeen Hall) are listed on the National Register of Historic Places. The first academy building, Abbot Hall, is an "exceptional" early example of the Greek Revival style. It was built in 1828–29. Since 1996, it has housed Phillips Academy's Brace Center for Gender Studies. An art gallery was added to the left side of Abbot Hall in 1906–07. It was designed by Andrews, Jaques & Rantoul of Boston. The art gallery housed the collection of Mrs. Esther Byers. The Merrill Memorial Gates and two side gates (the John P. Taylor and George G. Davis gates) were added in 1921 to the front and sides, respectively, of the Abbot Circle. Designed a few years earlier by the firm of McKim, Mead & White, similar gates appear at Harvard University, Princeton University, and Bowdoin College. The Abbot Circle, around which the main buildings are grouped, was re-dedicated on 3 May 1997. The tree-lined Maple Walk, which once connected the dining room at the back of Draper Hall with Phillips Street, remains in use. (The dining room was demolished.)

=== Efforts for the Preservation of the Abbot Campus ===
In 1988, Phillips Academy opened a proposal to repurpose buildings on the former Abbot Academy campus to increase rental and commercial use on the property. This plan was designed to prevent the academy from demolishing the land to make way for single-family homes or selling the acreage to private developers. The school argued that saving the buildings will ultimately allow for historical preservation. A town meeting was then set in place on April 4–6 of 1988, with the Phillips Academy historical preservation plan needing a two-thirds yes vote on Article 101 to get support in retaining the campus for the school's own use. However, some town members were hesitant to move forward with this plan. Those who wanted to vote no on Article 101, made the argument that the repurposed use of Abbot campus buildings for commercial use would in turn decrease the property value of existing Andover residential neighborhood homes. In the end, Phillips Academy ended up retaining the Abbot campus for its own use.

== Headmasters and headmistresses ==
School principals:

- Charles Goddard 1829–31
- Rev. Samuel Lamson 1832–34
- Rev. Samuel Gilman Brown 1835–38
- Rev. Lorenzo Lorraine Langstroth 1838–39
- Rev. Timothy Dwight Porter Stone 1839–42
- Rev. Asa Farwell 1842–52
- Peter Smith Byers 1853 (Elected but did not serve)
- Nancy Judson Hasseltine 1854–56
- Maria Jane Bancroft Brown 1856–57
- Emma L. Taylor 1857–59
- Philena McKeen 1859–92
- Laura Sophia Watson 1892–98
- Emily Adams Means 1898–1911
- Bertha Bailey 1912–35
- Marguerite Capen Hearsey 1936–55
- Mary Hinckley Crane (Mrs. Alexander) 1955–66
- Eleanor Tucker (Acting) 1966–68
- Donald Gordon 1968–73

For further information, consult The Philippian:

== Notable alumnae ==
- Julia Alvarez (1967) - Poet, novelist, essayist
- Harriette Newell Woods Baker (1833) - Story book author
- Alice Stone Blackwell (1867) - Editor Woman's Journal, activist, and translator
- Anna Brackett - Philosopher, educator
- Charlotte Emerson Brown - Clubwoman
- Eileen Christelow (1961) - Author of "Five Little Monkeys" children's book series
- Maria Susana Cummins (1845) - Author of international bestseller; domestic fiction writer
- Wendy Ewald (1969) - Photographer and educator, MacArthur Fellowship winner
- Julia Constance Fletcher - (1867)
- Ann Cole Gannett - Politician (1933)
- Mary H. Graves - Unitarian minister, literary editor, writer
- Marsha Kazarosian (PA 1974) - Attorney
- Lucy R. Lippard (1954) - Art theorist
- Sara Nelson (PA 1974) - Former editor-in-chief of Publishers Weekly
- Elizabeth Marshall Thomas (1949) - Anthropologist
- Elizabeth Stuart Phelps Ward (1858) - Early feminist author
- Kate Douglas Wiggin (1873) - Author of Rebecca of Sunnybrook Farm
- Francesca Woodman - Photographer
- Shirley Young (1951) - Businesswoman

For additional alumnae, consult Notable Alumni: Long List:

== Notable faculty ==
- Emily Hale, speech and drama, muse of T.S. Eliot
- Maud Morgan

== See also ==
- Hartwell and Richardson architects
- Phillips Academy

== Suggested reading ==
- Susan McIntosh Lloyd. "A Singular School: Abbot Academy 1828-1973", Hanover, NH: Published by Phillips Academy, Andover, 1979.
- Susan J. Montgomery and Roger G. Reed. "The Campus Guide. Phillips Academy Andover", New York: Princeton Architectural Press, 2000.
- Philena McKeen, headmistress. Author of "Annals of Fifty Years: A History of Abbot Academy, Andover, Mass., 1829-1879" and "Sequel to Annals of Fifty Years: A History of Abbot Academy, Andover, Mass., 1879-1892
- Massachusetts Board of Education; George A. Walton (1877), "Report on Academies: Abbot Female Academy", Annual Report...1875-76, Boston – via Internet Archive
