= Hampton (surname) =

Hampton is a surname of English origin. Notable people with the surname include:

- Ashton Hampton (born 2006), American football player
- Barry Hampton (born 1941), New Zealand cricketer
- Bruce Hampton (1947–2017), American musician
- Charles Hampton (disambiguation), multiple people
- Chase Hampton (baseball), American baseball player
- Chase Hampton (singer), American musician
- Christopher Hampton (born 1946), British playwright
- Dan Hampton (born 1957), American football player
- Dave Hampton (born 1947), American football player
- David Hampton (1964–2003), American con artist
- Dominique Hampton (born 2000), American football player
- Emma Stark Hampton (1843–1925), American organizational leader
- Ethan Hampton (born 2003), American football player
- Exie Lee Hampton (1893–1979), African-American educator, community leader and clubwoman
- Fred Hampton (1948–1969), African-American activist and deputy chairman of the Illinois chapter of the Black Panther Party
- Hannah Hampton (born 2000), English professional footballer
- Howard Hampton (born 1952), Canadian politician from Ontario
- Ike Hampton (born 1951), American baseball player
- James Hampton (disambiguation), multiple people
- Jane Hampton Cook, American historian
- Jean Elizabeth Hampton (1954–1996), American philosopher
- John Hampton (disambiguation), multiple people
- Karen Hampton (disambiguation), multiple people
- Keisha Hampton (born 1990), American basketball player
- Kimberly Hampton (1976–2004), first female military pilot to be shot down and killed in U.S. service
- Kym Hampton (born 1962), American basketball player
- Lionel Hampton (1908–2002), American jazz musician
- Martin L. Hampton (1890–1950), architect
- Michael Hampton (disambiguation), multiple people
- Millard Hampton (born 1956), American athlete
- Neil Hampton, Scottish curler
- Omarion Hampton (born 2003), American football player
- Rebecca Hampton (born 1973), French actress and television presenter
- Rodney Hampton (born 1969), American football player
- Saquan Hampton (born 1995), American football player
- Shanola Hampton (born 1977), American actress
- Trevor Hampton (1912–2002), founder of the first scuba diving center in Britain
- Wade Hampton (disambiguation), multiple people
- William Hampton (disambiguation), multiple people

== See also ==
- Hampton (given name)
- Hampton (disambiguation)
