= Missouri's 24th Senate district =

American legislative district

Missouri's 24th State Senate district
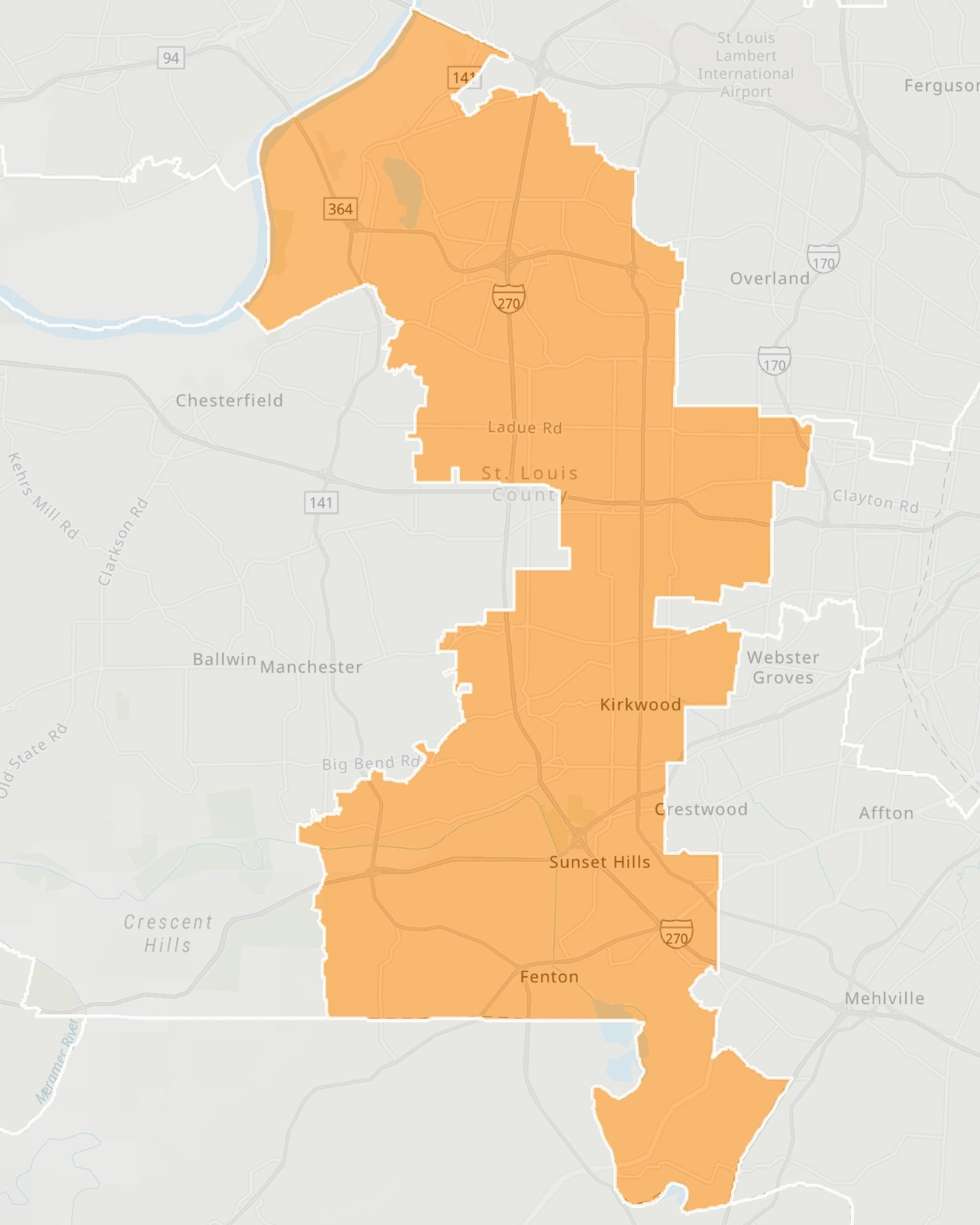
Senator
Tracy McCreery; D–Olivette
- Demographics: 78% White; 7% Black; 3% Hispanic; 7% Asian; 1% Other; 5% Multiracial
- Population (2023): 182,309

Missouri's 24th Senatorial District is one of 34 districts in the Missouri Senate. The district has been represented by Democrat Tracy McCreery since 2023.

== Geography ==
The district is based in central St. Louis County within the St. Louis metropolitan area. Major municipalities in the district include Creve Coeur, Des Peres, Kirkwood, and Maryland Heights. The district is also home to The Magic House: Children's Museum and the National Museum of Transportation.

== 2026 candidates ==
=== Democratic primary ===
- Tracy McCreery, incumbent senator

== Election results (1998–2022) ==
=== 1998 ===
Missouri's 24th Senatorial District election (1998)
Party	Candidate	Votes	%
Republican	Betty Sims	25,269	54.2
Democratic	Howard A. Shalowitz	19,991	42.9
Libertarian	Arnold J. Trembley	1,320	2.8
Total votes		46,580	100.0

=== 2002 ===
Missouri's 24th Senatorial District election (2002)
Party	Candidate	Votes	%
Democratic	Joan Bray	33,799	51.6
Republican	John B. Lewis	30,559	46.7
Libertarian	Dick Illyes	1,130	1.7
Total votes		65,488	100.0
Democratic gain from Republican			

=== 2006 ===
Missouri's 24th Senatorial District election (2006)
Party	Candidate	Votes	%
Democratic	Joan Bray (incumbent)	41,173	60.6
Republican	John W. Maupin	26,738	39.4
Total votes		67,911	100.0
Democratic hold			

=== 2010 ===
Missouri's 24th Senatorial District election (2010)
Party	Candidate	Votes	%
Republican	John Lamping	30,619	50.1
Democratic	Barbara Fraser	30,493	49.9
Total votes		61,112	100.0
Republican gain from Democratic			

=== 2014 ===
Missouri's 24th Senatorial District election (2014)
Party	Candidate	Votes	%
Democratic	Jill Schupp	28,022	50.1
Republican	John R. Ashcroft	26,196	46.8
Libertarian	Jim Higgins	1,727	3.1
Total votes		55,945	100.0
Democratic gain from Republican			

=== 2018 ===
Missouri's 24th Senatorial District election (2018)
Party	Candidate	Votes	%
Democratic	Jill Schupp (incumbent)	51,106	60.9
Republican	Gregory B. Powers	31,153	37.1
Libertarian	Jim Higgins	1,708	2.0
Total votes		83,967	100.0
Democratic hold			

=== 2022 ===
Missouri's 24th Senatorial District election (2022)
Party	Candidate	Votes	%
Democratic	Tracy McCreery	43,081	53.4
Republican	George J. Hruza	36,164	44.8
Libertarian	LaDonna Higgins	1,481	1.8
Total votes		80,726	100.0
Democratic hold			

== Statewide election results ==
Year	Office	Results
2008	President	Obama 49.7 – 49.3%
2012	President	Romney 54.4 – 45.6%
2016	President	Clinton 48.5 – 46.5%
2016	Senate	Kander 52.0 – 44.9%
2016	Governor	Koster 50.5 – 46.9%
2018	Senate	McCaskill 55.1 – 42.9%
2020	President	Biden 55.4 – 42.9%
2020	Governor	Galloway 53.3 – 45.1%
