= Island High School =

Coordinates: 37°47′11″N 122°17′11″W

- 500 Pacific Ave. Alameda, California, United States 94501

Information
- Type: Public high school
- Motto: Success By Choice
- Established: 1970s
- School district: Alameda Unified School District
- Principal: Ben Washofsky
- Staff: 6.39 (FTE)
- Faculty: 19
- Student to teacher ratio: 11.89
- Mascot: Tiki
- Website: island.alamedaunified.org

Island High School is a Mixed-sex education public high school serving grades 9-12. It is located in Alameda, California, United States, and is part of the Alameda Unified School District. Island High only admits students who are at least sixteen years old.

== Summary ==
Island High opened as a continuation school in the 1970s as an alternative high school to Alameda and Encinal High Schools. The original campus was located at 2437 Eagle Avenue in Alameda, near the Park Street and Fruitvale Bridges. In 2007, Island High moved to its second location at 250 Singleton Avenue, the site of the old George P. Miller Elementary School. The elementary school building was renovated to better suit a high school environment. The high school has since moved again to its current location.

Island High is different from most traditional high schools in the state of California, in that it allows students to earn 7.5 credits every semester, instead of the usual five at a traditional high school. Island High splits its grading periods into six "Hexemesters" (Or "Hexes") rather than four Quarters. Hexes last approximately six weeks and allow students to earn 2.5 subject credits in a class, the amount normally earned in one nine week-long quarter at a traditional high school. Despite this non-traditional schedule, Island High still follows the same standard school calendar set by the district.

Students may also earn additional subject credits through completion of Contracts and Challenge Exams. A Contract is an additional project taken on by a student in addition to their regular class workload that is to be completed outside of class time, subject credits vary by contract. Challenge Exams are tests that are administered once every Hex and if passed, applies five credits in the exam's subject area.

Grading at Island High also differs from that of a traditional high school, namely with the absence of failing (F) grades. In lieu a F, students who do not meet a subject's passing requirements are given a No Mark (NM) grade which does not affect their grade point average in the way a F does. Both F and NM grades do not award any credit.

== Enrollment ==
The student body of Island High has always been relatively small, with only approximately 200 students in the entire school. Most students at Island High are transfer students from Alameda and Encinal High Schools who are low on credits, with a small percentage of students transferring from outside the Alameda Unified School District. Once a student has a certain number of credits, he or she may choose to transfer out of Island and back to their original school. Few students actually choose to do this.

== Graduation requirements ==
Despite its status as a continuation high school, diplomas awarded from Island High are recognized in the same manner as diplomas issued from any other California high school. Students require 230 credits, a minimum GPA of 1.75, and twenty hours of community service to graduate. A student is considered a graduate on the very day they meet all requirements and graduations at Island High commonly occur on regular school days in the middle of the year. All graduates regardless of graduation date are invited to participate in a commencement ceremony at the end of the school year.

== See also ==
- Alameda Unified School District
- Continuation high school
