= Senator McCreary (disambiguation) =

James B. McCreary (1838–1918) was a U.S. Senator from Kentucky from 1903 to 1909. Senator McCreary may also refer to:

- David B. McCreary (1826–1906), Pennsylvania State Senate
- Henry Hamilton McCreary (1861–1921), Florida State Senate

== See also ==
- Senator McCreery (disambiguation)
