= Senator McCreery (disambiguation) =

Thomas C. McCreery (1816–1890) was a U.S. Senator from Kentucky from 1868 to 1871. Senator McCreery may also refer to:

- John W. McCreery (1845–1917), West Virginia State Senate
- Tracy McCreery (born 1966), Missouri State Senate
- William McCreery (Maryland politician) (1750–1814), Maryland State Senate

== See also ==
- Senator McCreary (disambiguation)
