= Senator Bray =

Senator Bray may refer to:

- Joan Bray (born 1945), Missouri State Senate
- Rodric Bray (born 1969), Indiana State Senate
- William M. Bray (1880–1964), Wisconsin State Senate
