= Karen Hampton =

Karen Hampton may refer to:

- Karen Hampton (textile designer), American textile designer, lives in Indiana
- Karen Hampton (weaver) (born 1958), American weaver and textile designer, lives in California
