= Mary Gennoy =

American activist (1951–2004)

- Born: Mary Elaine Gennoy; June 11, 1951; Alameda, California
- Died: September 5, 2004 (aged 53); San Francisco, California
- Occupation: Activist

Mary Elaine Gennoy (June 11, 1951 – September 5, 2004) was an American activist for LGBT rights, disability rights, and marijuana legalization, based in San Francisco.

== Early life and education ==
Gennoy was from Alameda, California, the daughter of William J. Gennoy and Doris Elaine Gennoy (later Gilla). Her father was a businessman and a World War II fighter pilot. Her mother was a secretary. She had congenital health issues she traced to prenatal radiation exposure, while her mother was in treatment for cancer. She attended Alameda High School in the 1960s, the College of Alameda in the early 1970s, and San Francisco State University from 1979 to 1984.

== Career ==
Gennoy was a familiar figure in San Francisco activist communities, working for LGBT rights, disability rights, the environment, and marijuana legalization. She was one of the original active members of the San Francisco Cannabis Buyers Club, along with "Brownie Mary" Rathbun, Dennis Peron, and others. "If you were born like me, you'd have no choice," she explained in 1998, about her focus on marijuana legalization, because her chronic health issues required pain management, and medical cannabis met her needs.

In 1992, Gennoy was a member of San Francisco's New Stonewall Liberation Day board of directors. She gathered signatures for Proposition 215 in 1996, and ran for the San Francisco Board of Supervisors as a write-in candidate in 2000. In 2002 she ran again for the Board of Supervisors. She was part of the Dykes on Bikes contingent in the San Francisco Pride Parade. She wrote poetry for local lesbian publications.

== Personal life and legacy ==
Gennoy was physically disabled, of short stature, and hard of hearing. She used a wheelchair in adulthood, and underwent numerous surgeries. She died in 2004, at the age of 53, after throat surgery for laryngeal cancer. She was one of the people commemorated by a quilt honoring disabled lesbians, created by Karen Hampton and exhibited at the San Francisco Public Library in 2010.
