= Wimberly =

Wimberly or Wimberley may refer to:

Surname

- Abner Wimberly (1926–1976), American football player
- Anthony Wimberly (born 1962), American serial killer
- Benjie E. Wimberly (born 1964), American politician
- Byron Wimberly (1892–1956), American football player and coach
- Corey Wimberly (born 1983), American baseball player and manager
- Don Wimberly (born 1937), American Episcopal bishop
- Douglas Wimberley (1896–1983), British Army officer
- George J. Wimberly (1914–1995), American architect
- John Wimberley (born 1945), American photographer and artist
- Lorris M. Wimberly (1898–1962), American politician
- Marcus Wimberly (born 1974), American football player
- Patrick Wimberly (born 1983), American musician
- Ronald Wimberly (born 1979), American cartoonist and illustrator
- Rush Wimberly (1873–1943), American politician

Other

- 5555 Wimberly, main-belt asteroid
- Wimberley, Texas, city in Hays County, Texas, United States

== See also ==
- Wemberley, nickname for Wembley Stadium, London
