= William Hampton =

William Hampton may refer to:

- William Hampton (mayor) (died 1480), Lord Mayor of London 1472/3
- William Hampton (cricketer) (1903–1964), English cricketer
- William Hampton (gridiron football) (born 1975), American gridiron football player
- William Hampton (poet) (born 1959), British poet
- William H. Hampton (1893–1957), New York state senator
- William Wade Hampton (1854–1928), one of the first attorneys in Gainesville, Florida
- William Wade Hampton (politician) (1858–1930), American politician from North Carolina
- William M. Hampton (died 1960), American physician and politician from North Carolina
