= The Alachua Advocate =

Newspaper in Gainesville, Florida, US (1881–1889)

- Type: Weekly newspaper
- Founder: Henry Hamilton McCreary
- Publisher: McCreary and White
- Founded: 1881
- Ceased publication: 1889
- Headquarters: Gainesville, Florida, U.S.
- OCLC number: 32993617

The Alachua Advocate (1881 – 1889) was a weekly newspaper published in Gainesville, Florida, the county seat of Alachua County.

== History ==
The Alachua Advocate was established by Henry Hamilton McCreary in 1881. In 1881 it was published on Wednesdays, and was documented as an independent Democrat newspaper. McCreary and White were its publishers in 1883. By 1884, it was described as Alachua County's principal newspaper.

It advocated in 1886 for a cannery to make use of tomatoes and other crops, when shipping could not be achieved promptly. By 1889, the paper closed. After the closure McCreary merged The Alachua Advocate and the Gainesville Weekly Bee, to create the Gainesville Daily Sun (now The Gainesville Sun).

== See also ==
- List of weekly newspapers in the United States
