= Wade Hampton =

Wade Hampton may refer to the following people:

== People ==
- Wade Hampton I (1752–1835), American soldier in Revolutionary War and War of 1812 and U.S. congressman
- Wade Hampton II (1791–1858), American plantation owner and soldier in War of 1812
- Wade Hampton III (1818–1902), American Civil War soldier and politician; elected Governor and Senator of South Carolina, opponent of Reconstruction
- William Wade Hampton (1854–1928), Florida lawyer commonly known as Wade Hampton
- Wade Hampton Frost (1880-1938), professor of epidemiology
- Wade Randolph Hampton, an American DJ active since the mid-1990s

== Places ==
- Kusilvak Census Area, Alaska, formerly Wade Hampton Census Area
- Wade Hampton, South Carolina
- Wade Hampton Boulevard
