= Alameda Unified School District =

School district in California

Location
- Alameda, California United States

District information
- Motto: "Excellence & Equality for All Students"
- Grades: K–12
- Established: 1964
- Superintendent: Pasquale Scuderi

Students and staff
- Students: 9,300
- Teachers: 540

Other information
- Website: www.alamedaunified.org

The Alameda Unified School District serves Alameda, California, United States.

The school district is a "unified" district (as of 1936), meaning that it includes K-8 schools and high schools in the same jurisdiction. As with all California school districts, it is not a part of the city government. The school board is elected separately from the Alameda city council, and has been since April 1969. The city council has no direct power over the school board.

The AUSD educates approximately 9,300 students each year, in ten elementary schools, two middle schools, and four high schools. The district also operates an Adult School and a Child Development Center. Three elementary schools were closed and consolidated at the end of the 2005–2006 school year; Miller Elementary, Woodstock Elementary and Longfellow Elementary students went to Ruby Bridges Elementary.

In 2009, the district received significant media attention for controversy surrounding an anti-bullying curriculum approved by the Board of Trustees, known as "Lesson 9", which focused on reducing bullying against LGBT students. The curriculum sparked two lawsuits, which were subsequently dismissed.

== Schools in this district ==
=== Adult schools ===
- Alameda Adult School

=== High schools ===
- Alameda Community Learning Center (charter school 6–12)
- Alameda High School
- Alameda Science and Technology Institute
- Encinal High School (in 2013, Junior Jets program started for grades 6–8)
- Island High School (continuation school)

=== Middle schools ===
- The Academy of Alameda (charter school; formerly Chipman Middle School)
- Lincoln Middle School
- Will C. Wood Middle School

=== Elementary schools ===
- Amelia Earhart Elementary School
- Bay Farm Elementary School (in 2012, Board of Education approved adding grades 6–8)
- Donald D. Lum Elementary School (closed 2017)
- Edison Elementary School
- Frank Otis Elementary School
- Franklin Elementary School
- Love Elementary School (renamed 2019, formerly Haight Elementary)
- Maya Lin School (formerly Washington Elementary)
- Mastick Elementary School (closed - now Mastick Senior Center)
- Ruby Bridges Elementary School
- William Paden Elementary School

=== Preschool and other ===
- Woodstock Child Development Center

=== History of Alameda schools ===
1855 Schermerhorn School – located on west side of Court, between Van Buren and Jackson Street

- 1864 Alameda School replaced Schermerhorn School.
- 1892 Wilson School replaced Alameda School with an eight-classroom school.
- 1911 Name was changed from Wilson School to Lincoln.
- 1917 The Lincoln School was rebuilt.

1860 Encinal School – located on Lincoln Avenue between Stanton and Paru Streets.

- 1865 A two-room building was erected on the northwest corner of Bay Street and Santa Clara. This structure replaced Encinal School on Lincoln.
- 1891 A new eight-room building was opened.
- 1901 Name was changed from Encinal to Mastick School.
- 1939 A new structure replaced the 1891 structure.
- 1979 K-4 elementary was closed.
- 1980 School was closed.
- 2000 In a land swap deal with AUSD, the city assumed ownership for the ongoing operation of Mastick Senior Center.

1874 Boehmer's Hall – a rented room on Park Street used a temporary quarters for high school

1875 Park Street School was closed in 1879 with the opening of Porter School.

1875 Haight School – located at Santa Clara and Chestnut as a combination elementary and high school

- 1900 High school classes moved from Haight School to Porter School.
- 1911 A new fire-resistant school was built to replace the 1875 structure.
- 1973 School was demolished.
- 1975 Haight School was rebuilt and opened in 1976.
- 2006 Haight School was closed for one year to make seismic upgrades.
- 2019 Haight Elementary School renamed to Love Elementary School.

1875 West End School – located at Fifth and Pacific

- 1895 Name changed to Longfellow School. A ten classroom building replaced the 1875 structure.
- 1942 A new structure replaced the 1895 structure.
- 1951 Ten new classrooms were added. A multi-purpose room was added
- 2006 School was closed.
- 2009 Nea Charter School moved onto the site.
- 2011 Woodstock Child Development Center was relocated to the site.
- 2014 Island High School was relocated to the site.

1879 Porter School – located on Alameda Avenue near Oak Street

- 1916 A new structure replaced the 1879 structure.
- 1973 Fire destroyed the school.

1882 Bay Farm Island School – a rented building on Bay Farm Island

- 1890 The school was closed and students were bussed to schools on the East End.
- 1961 Three buses were transporting 194 students to Alameda from Bay Farm.

1891 Everett School – located at the corner of Eagle Avenue and Everett Street

- 1971 Old school was demolished and Island High was opened with four portables.
- 2006 Island High was relocated to the George Miller Elementary School site.
- 2014 The Board of Education approved a land swap that gave this property to the Alameda Housing Authority.

1902 Alameda High School – located at 2200 Central Avenue near Walnut Street

- 1926 A new building replaced the 1902 structure.
- 1977 The historical building on Central was closed to students. The new building on the corner of Encinal and Walnut opened.
- 1991 The east wing of Central building was renovated to meet Field Act standards and students began using classrooms.
- 2012 AUSD closed the Adult School and administration offices in the east wing and relocates to administrative offices to leased space at 2060 Challenger Drive. The Adult School relocated to Woodstock School site.

1909 Washington School – located at Eight and Santa Clara Avenue

- 1957 A new building replaced the 1909 structure.
- 2012 Washington Elementary was renamed Maya Lin School. It became an arts magnet school.

1926 Versailles School – bounded by Versailles, Lincoln, Pearl, and Buena Vista

- 1942 A new building replaced 1926 structures and was renamed Edison School.

1927 Franklin School – located at Franklin Park, housed in a reconstructed cottage

- 1930 Mr. Sadler's home was purchased and remodeled for a school and renamed Sadler School.
- 1951 A new structure replaced the 1930 structure and renamed to Franklin School.
- 1984 School was closed
- 1994 School was reopened.

1944 Webster School – located in the Webster Housing Project

- 1958 School was closed.

1944 John Muir School – located in the Estuary Housing Project

- 196x School was closed.

1946 Encinal School – located in the Encinal Housing Project

- 1953 School was renamed to Burbank School.
- 1955 School was closed.

1951 Woodstock School – located at 1900 Third Street, near Atlantic Avenue

- 2006 School was closed.
- 2006 Site was temporarily used as the location of Haight School while the actual Haight School was under renovation.
- 2007 New site of Bay Area School of Enterprise (BASE)
- 2011 Island High School was relocated from the George Miller school site.
- 2012 Alameda Adult School was relocated to this site from Alameda High site (2200 Central Avenue).
- 2014 Nea charter school, both Upper Village (6–12) and Lower Village (K-5) were relocated to the site.
- 2014 ACLC charter school (6–12) was relocated to the site.

1951 Frank Otis School – located on Fillmore Street

1952 Encinal High School – located at 210 Central Avenue

1955 William Paden School – located at 444 Central Avenue

- 1984 Elementary school was closed.
- 1992 It was reopened as an elementary school. This eventually changed to K-8.
- 2006 Grades 6–8 were closed.

1961 Donald Lum School – located at Otis Street and Sandcreek Avenue

- 2017 School was closed.

1965 Will C Wood Middle School – located at 420 Grand Street

- 2013 Charter school ACLC was relocated to Wood School campus, using a portion of the campus.

1977 Lincoln Middle School – located on Fernside and San Jose

1977 George Miller Elementary School – located at 250 Singleton

- 2006 School was closed.
- 2008 Island High School moved onto the campus.
- 2011 Site was abandoned by school district as infrastructure upgrades were cost-prohibitive.

1979 Amelia Earhart Elementary School – located at 400 Packet Landing

1992 Bay Farm Elementary School – located at 200 Aughinbaugh

2006 Ruby Bridges Elementary – located at 351 Jack London Avenue

== Administration ==
The superintendent is Pasquale Scuderi, who took office in 2019.

== Bond and parcel measures ==
=== Tax bonds ===
The first school bond measure was passed in 1874, and built the city's first high school and the main grammar school located on Chestnut and Santa Clara. The 1874 bond also purchased property at Fifth and Pacific Avenue, and a school opened in 1875. In 1878 the next bond measure was used to purchase six lots on the south side of Alameda Avenue between Oak and Walnut. Porter School opened in 1879. Additional bonds were issued in 1894 to build four new schools. In 1901 high school students campaigned vigorously to get a bond measure to build a new $65,000 high school. Bonds elections in 1907, 1909 and 1915 funded the most ambitious building campaign. Three old schools were replaced with new structures, and one new school was built. Voters passed a $750,000 bond in 1923 (supplemented with an additional $350,000 in 1925). As a result, construction of Alameda High School started in November 1924, and it opened in August 1926.

In 1933, the Field Act was passed after an earthquake severely damaged schools in Long Beach. While federal funds were used to rehabilitate some existing schools to comply with the Field Act, a $222,000 bond was passed in 1940. With World War II, Alameda's population exploded from 38,000 to 90,000. The federal government built three inexpensive grammar schools to serve children living in federal housing projects that housed the workers for the Naval Air station and shipbuilding yards.

In the 1940s, the baby boom was underway with 15,000 Alameda babies being born. In 1948, a $2,840,000 bond measure was passed. The lion's share of the bond was used to buy land and build Encinal High School. In 1951 a survey showed that 45 percent of children enrolled in Alameda schools had parents living or working on federally related properties. As a result, the school district received $2,250,000 from the federal government for school construction between 1951 and 1955. In 1953 $3,000,000 in bonds was approved. During the 1950s federal grants and bond revenues totaled $8,500,000.

The 1960s saw a frenzy of demolition and apartment construction in old Alameda. Building out of South Shore led to an all-time enrollment high of 12,500 students. In 1967 AB450 required school districts to bring their pre-1933 schools up to structural standards of the 1933 Field Act by 1983 (the deadline was moved up to 1975 the following year). Inspection of Alameda's four pre-1933 schools (Haight, Porter, Lincoln and Alameda High) ruled them to be unsafe.

In 1964 a $4 million bond issue barely passed. Voters rejected bond measures in 1968, 1973, 1974, 1975 and 1976. During the 1970s the school district had to borrow monies from the state for school construction.

In 1989 a $47.7 million bond issue was passed, which originally cost taxpayers $103 for every $100,000 in property value. That amount declined to $59 per $100,000 in assessed value. This tax was originally set to sunset in 2014, but was instead kept in place to pay for a subsequent bond issue in 2004.

In 2004 a $63 million bond issue, Measure C, was approved by voters. The measure refinanced the existing 1989 bond along with the new $63 million bond issue. The net effect was to keep taxpayer payments at $59 per $100,000, but extend the time from 2014 to 2034. The school district said on the ballot measure statement that it expected to qualify for over $17 million in state matching funds if the measure was approved. The district received about $14.8 million in state matching funds. As of the fall of 2013, Alameda residents could see the tax on their property tax bill as "Voter Approved Debt Service – School Unified."

In 2014, Measure I, a $179 million bond issue, was approved by voters.

In 2022, Measure B, a $298 million bond issue, was approved by voters to complete modernization at Alameda High School and Encinal Jr/Sr High School. The bond also includes funding to modernize Wood Middle and Lincoln Middle Schools.

=== General parcel taxes ===
A four-year $50 parcel tax (Measure A) failed in 1997. The election was on June 3, and the measure garnered only 57.5% of the vote, falling short of the two-third's supermajority required to pass.

In 2001, a five-year $109 per parcel tax (Measure A) was approved by voters.

In 2005, the parcel tax from 2001 (Measure A) was increased to $189 and extended for seven years.

In 2008, a four-year parcel tax (Measure H) was passed. The residential parcel rate was $120 and commercial rate was 15 cents per square foot, with a minimum of $120 and maximum of $9,500. Two lawsuits were filed challenging the legality of Measure H. Both parcel taxes, Measure A and Measure H, were set to expire in 2012.

In 2010, Measure E, which would have replaced Measures A and H with a new tax, and increased the rate from $309/yr to $659/year for a residential parcel, received 65.6% of the vote, falling short of the 2/3 approval required to pass.

Following the failure of Measure E in 2010, AUSD placed a new ballot measure, Measure A, on the ballot for March 8, 2011. The measure as proposed would tax parcels at a nominal rate of 32 cents per building square foot, with a maximum tax of $7,999/year. Parcels with no building improvements would pay a minimum $299/year. The measure passed with a 68% approval.

In 2013, the California Supreme Court held that a prior lower court ruling would stand, a ruling that upheld a portion of the Borikas lawsuit over Measure H, declaring that the school district could not set different tax rates for commercial and residential property, and setting the stage for a refund of millions of dollars of commercial property taxes collected under measure H.

In 2016, Measure B1 passed with 74% of Alameda voters voting yes. Measure B1 was an extension of the existing Measure A passed in 2011. In January 2017, a lawsuit was filed challenging the structure of the parcel tax. In April 2018, the Alameda County Superior Court entered a judgment upholding Measure B1.

In 2024, voters passed Measure E, a parcel tax that effectively renews and combines Measure A1 and Measure B1. Measure E will begin collecting revenues in 2025.

== Lawsuits ==
- Nelco, Inc. v. Alameda Unified School District, Alameda County Superior Court, #RG 08-405984 (Measure A), Superior Court ruled in AUSD's favor, September 2011. No appeal moving forward.
- Borikas v. Alameda Unified School Dist., 214 Cal. App. 4th 135, 154 Cal. Rptr. 3d 186 (Ct. App. 2013). Alameda County Superior Court, VG08-405316 (Measure H) Superior Court ruled in AUSD favor, June 2010. California Court of Appeal overturned part of the ruling, and remanded to lower court to determine remedies, December, 2012.
- Beery et al. v. Alameda Unified School District, Alameda County Superior Court, RG08-405984 (Measure H), case consolidated with Borikas case
- Cook, Dietrich v. Alameda Unified School District, Alameda County Superior Court, RG10-498999 (alleged open meeting violation pertaining to Lesson 9), dismissed by judge
- Balde v. Alameda Unified School District, Alameda County Superior Court, RG09-468037 (Lesson 9), judge ruled in AUSD's favor, November 2009
