= John Hampton (disambiguation) =

John Hampton (c. 1806–1869) was Governor of Western Australia.

John Hampton may also refer to:

- John Hampton (Oxford) (died 1328), Mayor of Oxford, England, 1319–1323
- John de Hampton, MP for Hampshire, England, 1362
- John Hampton (MP), MP for Hampshire, England, 1394
- John Hampton (abbot) Abbot of Shrewsbury, England, 1426–1433
- John Hampton (died 1472), MP for Staffordshire, England, 1437, 1439, 1442, 1445, 1449, and 1453
- John P. Hampton (died 1827), first Chief Justice of the Supreme Court of Mississippi, United States
- John Hampton (footballer) (1901–1939), English footballer
- John Hampton (philanthropist) (1907–2010), American journalist and philanthropist
- John Hampton (music producer) (c.1953–2014), American music producer
- John G. Hampton, director of MacKenzie Art Gallery
