= 2020 United States House of Representatives elections in Missouri =

- November 3, 2020

All 8 Missouri seats to the United States House of Representatives
| | Majority party | Minority party |
|---|---|---|
| Party | Republican | Democratic |
| Last election | 6 | 2 |
| Seats won | 6 | 2 |
| Seat change | Steady | Steady |
| Popular vote | 1,723,982 | 1,172,135 |
| Percentage | 57.98% | 39.42% |
| Swing | ▲2.95% | ▼3.09% |

Republican
50–60%
60–70%
70–80%
80–90%
Democratic
50–60%
70–80%
80–90%

The 2020 United States House of Representatives elections in Missouri were held on November 3, 2020, to elect the eight U.S. representatives from the state of Missouri, one from each of the state's eight congressional districts. The elections coincided with the 2020 United States presidential election, as well as other elections to the House of Representatives, elections to the United States Senate, and various state and local elections.

The primaries were held on August 4, 2020.

== Overview ==
| District | Republican | | Democratic | | Others | | Total | | Result |
| District | Votes | % | Votes | % | Votes | % | Votes | % | Result |
|---|---|---|---|---|---|---|---|---|---|
| District 1 | 59,940 | 18.96% | 249,087 | 78.78% | 7,144 | 2.26% | 316,171 | 100.0% | Democratic hold |
| District 2 | 233,157 | 51.89% | 204,540 | 45.52% | 11,651 | 2.59% | 449,348 | 100.0% | Republican hold |
| District 3 | 282,866 | 69.44% | 116,095 | 28.50% | 8,387 | 2.06% | 407,348 | 100.0% | Republican hold |
| District 4 | 245,247 | 67.59% | 107,635 | 29.66% | 9,954 | 2.74% | 362,836 | 100.0% | Republican hold |
| District 5 | 135,934 | 38.57% | 207,180 | 58.79% | 9,316 | 2.64% | 352,430 | 100.0% | Democratic hold |
| District 6 | 258,709 | 67.06% | 118,926 | 30.83% | 8,144 | 2.11% | 385,779 | 100.0% | Republican hold |
| District 7 | 254,318 | 68.87% | 98,111 | 26.57% | 16,854 | 4.56% | 369,283 | 100.0% | Republican hold |
| District 8 | 253,811 | 76.86% | 70,561 | 21.37% | 5,854 | 1.77% | 330,226 | 100.0% | Republican hold |
| Total | 1,723,982 | 57.98% | 1,172,135 | 39.42% | 77,304 | 2.60% | 2,973,421 | 100.0% | |

Popular vote
| Republican | 57.98% |
| Democratic | 39.42% |
| Other | 2.60% |

House seats
| Republican | 75.00% |
| Democratic | 25.00% |

== District 1 ==
2020 Missouri's 1st congressional district election
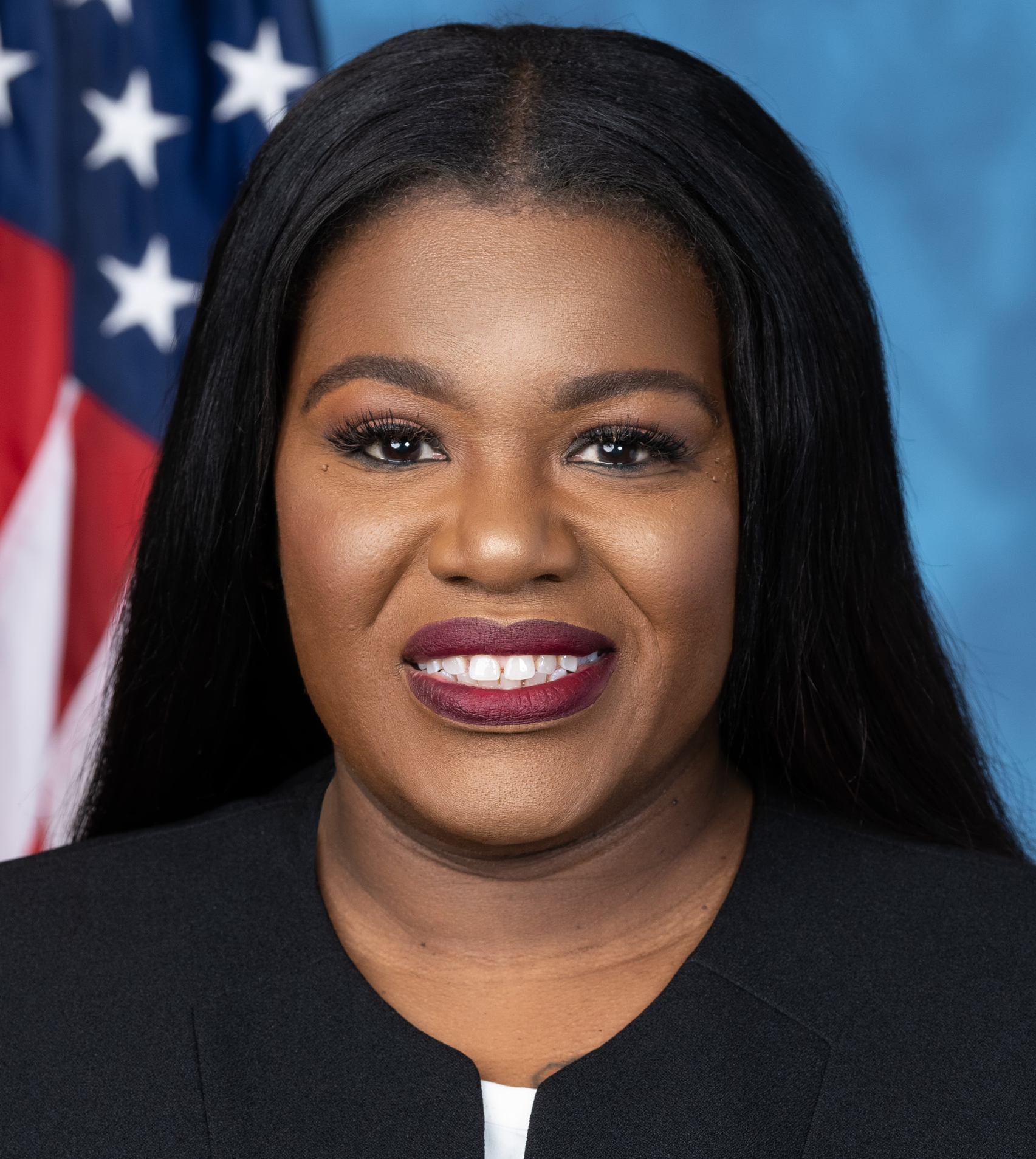

| Nominee | Cori Bush | Anthony Rogers |
| Party | Democratic | Republican |
| Popular vote | 249,087 | 59,940 |
| Percentage | 78.8% | 19.0% |
- Bush: 70–80% 80–90%
U.S. Representative before election
Lacy Clay
Democratic
Elected U.S. Representative
Cori Bush
Democratic

The 1st district is of the city of St. Louis and much of northern St. Louis County, including Florissant and University City. The incumbent was Democrat Lacy Clay, who was re-elected with 80.1% of the vote in 2018.

=== Democratic primary ===
==== Candidates ====
===== Declared =====
- Katherine Bruckner, candidate for MO-91 in 2008
- Cori Bush, civil rights activist, candidate for Missouri's 1st congressional district in 2018, and candidate for U.S. Senate in 2016
- Lacy Clay, incumbent U.S. representative

==== Endorsements ====
Lacy Clay

Federal officials

- Kamala Harris, U.S. senator from California
- Nancy Pelosi, U.S. representative from California's 12th congressional district and House Speaker

Labor unions

- Alliance for Retired Americans

Organizations

- Congressional Progressive Caucus
- Planned Parenthood Action Fund
- Sierra Club

Newspapers and media

- St. Louis American
- St. Louis Post-Dispatch
Cori Bush

U.S. senators

- Bernie Sanders, U.S. senator from Vermont

State officials

- Bruce Franks Jr., former state representative (2016–2019)

Organizations

- Brand New Congress
- Democratic Socialists of America
- Justice Democrats
- National Women's Political Caucus
- Our Revolution-Missouri Chapter
- Sierra Club
- Sunrise Movement STL

Individuals

- Jamaal Bowman, middle school principal and 2020 Democratic nominee in NY-16

==== Polling ====
| Poll source | Date(s) administered | Sample size (Note: Key: A – all adults RV – registered voters LV – likely voters V – unclear) | Margin of error | Katherine Bruckner | Cori Bush | Lacy Clay | Undecided |
|---|---|---|---|---|---|---|---|
| Data for Progress (Note: Poll released after the primary in August) | August 1–3, 2020 | 250 (LV) | – | 7% | 42% | 42% | 9% |

==== Primary results ====
Democratic primary results 50–60% Bush 40–50% Clay

Democratic primary results
| Party | Candidate | Votes | % |
|---|---|---|---|
| Democratic | Cori Bush | 73,274 | 48.5 |
| Democratic | Lacy Clay (incumbent) | 68,887 | 45.6 |
| Democratic | Katherine Bruckner | 8,850 | 5.9 |
| Total votes | | 151,011 | 100.0 |

=== Republican primary ===
==== Candidates ====
===== Declared =====
- Winnie Heartstrong, activist
- Anthony Rogers, radio show host

==== Primary results ====
Republican primary results
| Party | Candidate | Votes | % |
|---|---|---|---|
| Republican | Anthony Rogers | 6,979 | 61.5 |
| Republican | Winnie Heartstrong | 4,367 | 38.5 |
| Total votes | | 11,346 | 100.0 |

=== Libertarian primary ===
==== Candidates ====
===== Declared =====
- Alex Furman, vice president of the St. Louis chapter of the far-right neo-fascist organization Proud Boys

==== Primary results ====
Libertarian primary results
| Party | Candidate | Votes | % |
|---|---|---|---|
| Libertarian | Alex Furman | 337 | 100.0 |
| Total votes | | 337 | 100.0 |

=== General election ===
==== Predictions ====
| Source | Ranking | As of |
|---|---|---|
| The Cook Political Report | Safe D | July 2, 2020 |
| Inside Elections | Safe D | June 2, 2020 |
| Sabato's Crystal Ball | Safe D | July 2, 2020 |
| Politico | Safe D | April 19, 2020 |
| Daily Kos | Safe D | June 3, 2020 |
| RCP | Safe D | June 9, 2020 |
| Niskanen | Safe D | June 7, 2020 |

==== Polling ====
| Poll source | Date(s) administered | Sample size | Margin of error | Cori Bush (D) | Anthony Rodgers (R) | Other | Undecided |
|---|---|---|---|---|---|---|---|
| YouGov | September 24 – October 7, 2020 | 152 (LV) | – | 61% | 26% | 7% | 7% |

==== Results ====
Missouri's 1st congressional district, 2020
| Party | Candidate | Votes | % |
|---|---|---|---|
| Democratic | Cori Bush | 249,087 | 78.8 |
| Republican | Anthony Rogers | 59,940 | 19.0 |
| Libertarian | Alex Furman | 6,766 | 2.1 |
| Independent | Martin Baker (write-in) | 378 | 0.1 |
| Total votes | | 316,171 | 100.0 |
| Democratic hold | | | |

== District 2 ==
2020 Missouri's 2nd congressional district election
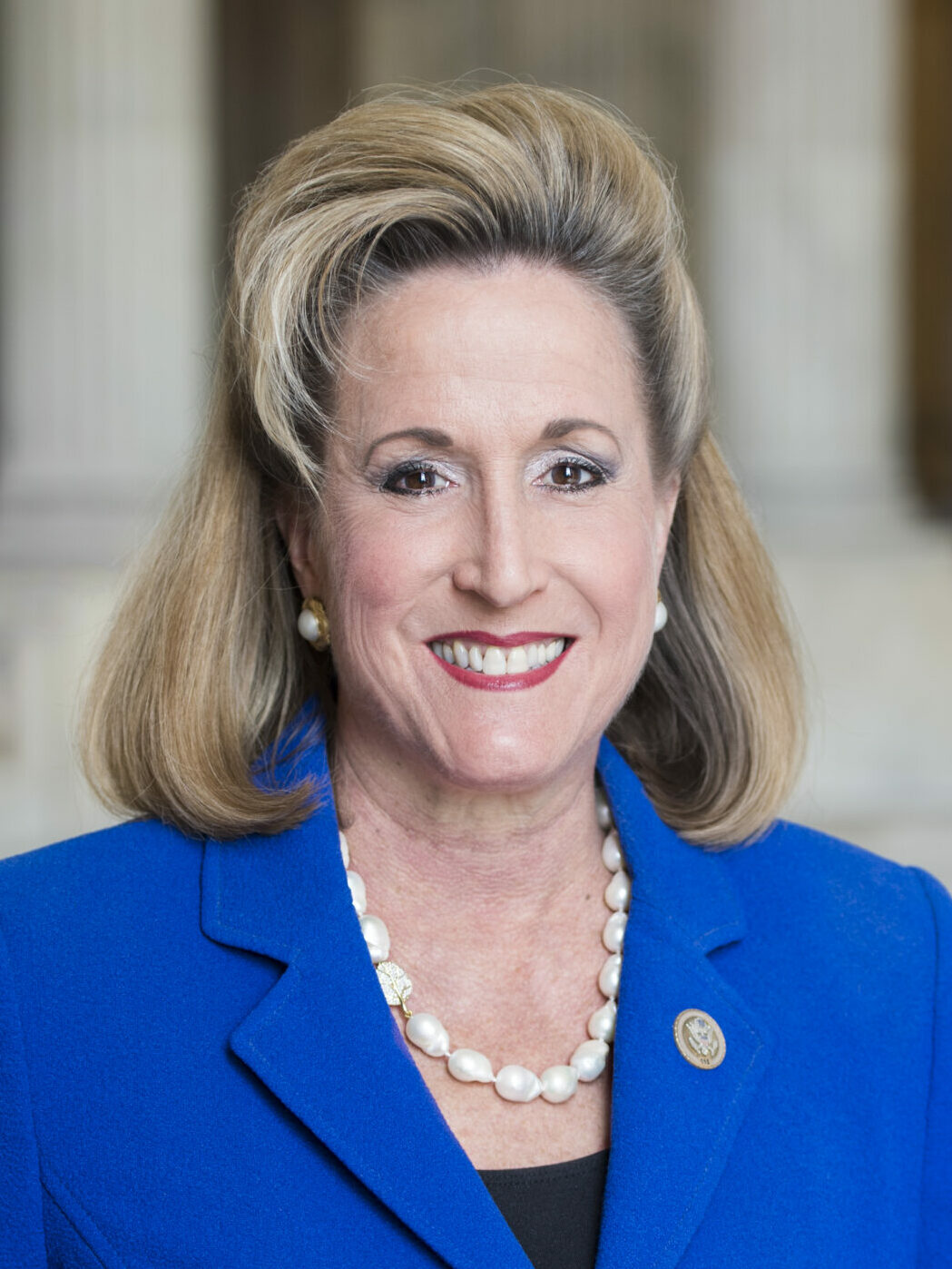

| Nominee | Ann Wagner | Jill Schupp |
| Party | Republican | Democratic |
| Popular vote | 233,157 | 204,540 |
| Percentage | 51.9% | 45.5% |
- Wagner: 50–60%
U.S. Representative before election
Ann Wagner
Republican
Elected U.S. Representative
Ann Wagner
Republican

The 2nd district is based in eastern Missouri, and includes the southern and western suburbs of St. Louis, including Arnold, Town and Country, Wildwood, Chesterfield, and Oakville. The incumbent was Republican Ann Wagner, who was re-elected with 51.2% of the vote in 2018.

=== Republican primary ===
==== Candidates ====
===== Declared =====
- Ann Wagner, incumbent U.S. representative

==== Primary results ====
Republican primary results
| Party | Candidate | Votes | % |
|---|---|---|---|
| Republican | Ann Wagner (incumbent) | 63,686 | 100.0 |
| Total votes | | 63,686 | 100.0 |

=== Democratic primary ===
==== Candidates ====
===== Declared =====
- Jill Schupp, state senator

===== Declined =====
- Becky Morgan, leader of the Missouri chapter of Moms Demand Action for Gun Sense in America
- Cort VanOstran, attorney and nominee for Missouri's 2nd congressional district in 2018

==== Endorsements ====
Jill Schupp

U.S. presidents

- Barack Obama, 44th president of the United States (2009–2017), U.S. senator from Illinois (2005–2008)

U.S. vice presidents

- Joe Biden, 47th vice president of the United States (2009–2017), U.S. senator from Delaware (1973–2009)

Newspapers

- St. Louis American
- St. Louis Post Dispatch

Organizations

- American Association for Justice
- Emily's List
- End Citizens United
- Human Rights Campaign
- League of Conservation Voters
- NARAL Pro-Choice America
- Planned Parenthood
- Sierra Club

==== Primary results ====
Democratic primary results
| Party | Candidate | Votes | % |
|---|---|---|---|
| Democratic | Jill Schupp | 103,164 | 100.0 |
| Total votes | | 103,164 | 100.0 |

=== Libertarian primary ===
==== Candidates ====
===== Declared =====
- Martin Schulte

==== Primary results ====
Libertarian primary results
| Party | Candidate | Votes | % |
|---|---|---|---|
| Libertarian | Martin Schulte | 737 | 100.0 |
| Total votes | | 737 | 100.0 |

=== General election ===
==== Predictions ====
| Source | Ranking | As of |
|---|---|---|
| The Cook Political Report | Tossup | August 6, 2020 |
| Inside Elections | Tilt D (flip) | October 28, 2020 |
| Sabato's Crystal Ball | Lean R | November 2, 2020 |
| Politico | Tossup | October 11, 2020 |
| Daily Kos | Tossup | August 31, 2020 |
| RCP | Tossup | June 9, 2020 |
| Niskanen | Lean D (flip) | June 7, 2020 |
| 538 | Lean R | October 30, 2020 |

==== Polling ====
| Poll source | Date(s) administered | Sample size | Margin of error | Ann Wagner (R) | Jill Schupp (D) | Other | Undecided |
|---|---|---|---|---|---|---|---|
| Change Research | October 29 – November 2, 2020 | 597 (LV) | ± 4.3% | 46% | 46% | 5% (Note: "Don't recall" and Schulte (L) with 2%; Did not vote with 1%; Would not vote with 0%) | 2% |
| YouGov | September 24 – October 7, 2020 | 115 (LV) | – | 42% | 51% | 3% | 4% |
| Normington, Petts & Associates (D) | September 10–14, 2020 | 400 (LV) | ± 4.9% | 49% | 49% | <1% | 2% |
| Public Policy Polling (D) (Note: Poll conducted for the House Majority Pac.) | August 13–14, 2020 | 925 (V) | – | 42% | 45% | – | 14% |
| Remington Research Group/Missouri Scout | February 19–20, 2020 | 1,360 (LV) | ± 2.6% | 50% | 40% | – | 10% |

Hypothetical polling

with Generic Republican and Generic Democrat

| Poll source | Date(s) administered | Sample size | Margin of error | Generic Republican | Generic Democrat | Undecided |
|---|---|---|---|---|---|---|
| Normington, Petts & Associates (D) | September 10–14, 2020 | 400 (LV) | ± 4.9% | 47% | 48% | 5% |

==== Results ====
Missouri's 2nd congressional district, 2020
| Party | Candidate | Votes | % |
|---|---|---|---|
| Republican | Ann Wagner (incumbent) | 233,157 | 51.9 |
| Democratic | Jill Schupp | 204,540 | 45.5 |
| Libertarian | Martin Schulte | 11,647 | 2.6 |
| Write-in | | 4 | 0.0 |
| Total votes | | 449,348 | 100.0 |
| Republican hold | | | |

== District 3 ==
2020 Missouri's 3rd congressional district election
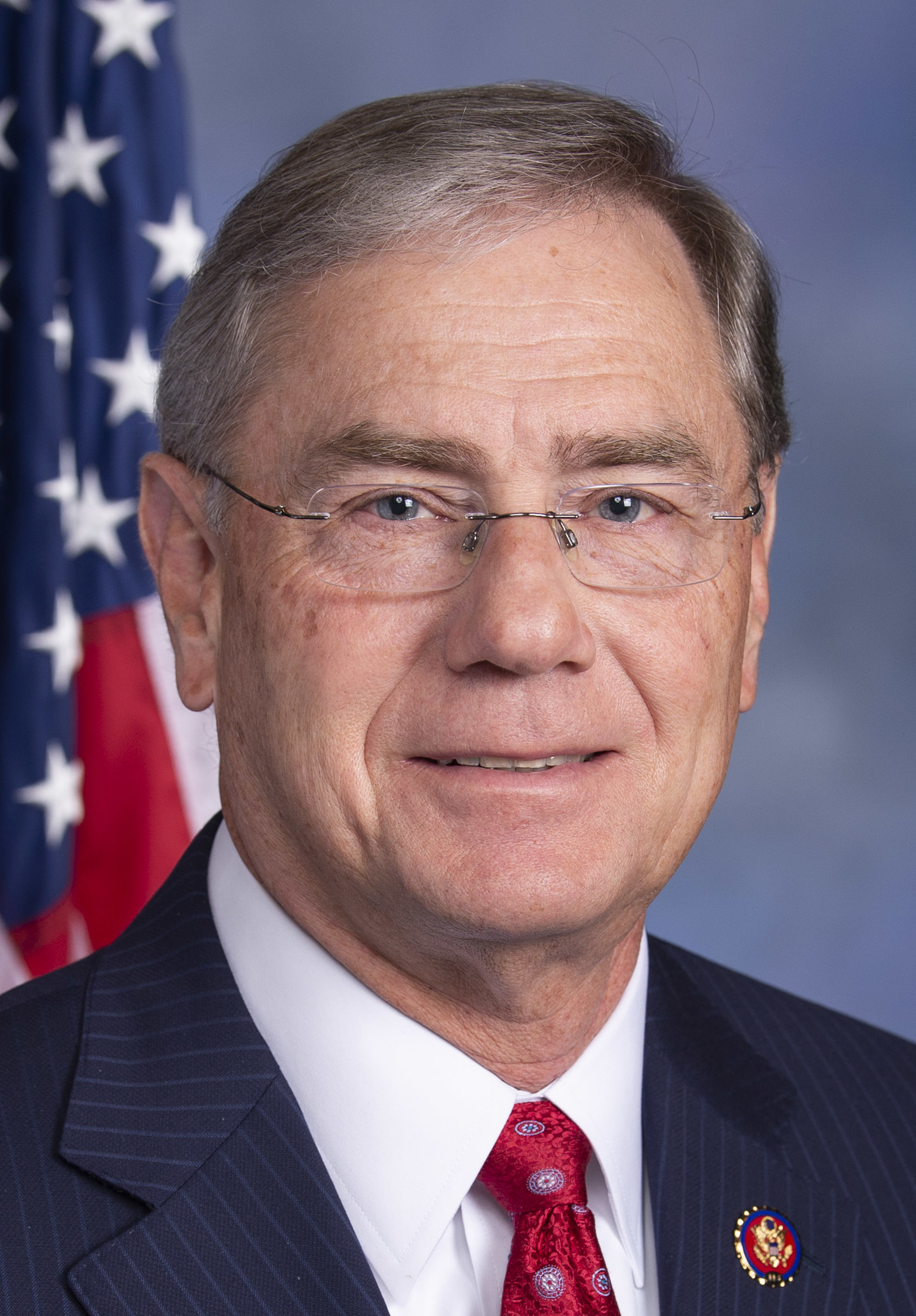

| Nominee | Blaine Luetkemeyer | Megan Rezabek |
| Party | Republican | Democratic |
| Popular vote | 282,866 | 116,095 |
| Percentage | 69.4% | 28.5% |
- Luetkemeyer: 60–70% 70–80% 80–90%
U.S. Representative before election
Blaine Luetkemeyer
Republican
Elected U.S. Representative
Blaine Luetkemeyer
Republican

The third district encompasses east-central Missouri, taking in Jefferson City, Troy, O'Fallon, and Washington. The incumbent was Republican Blaine Luetkemeyer, who was re-elected with 65.1% of the vote in 2018.

=== Republican primary ===
==== Candidates ====
===== Declared =====
- Blaine Luetkemeyer, incumbent U.S. representative
- Jeffrey Nowak, former marine
- Lynette Trares, Missouri State Department of Health and Senior Services employee
- Brandon Wilkinson, truck driver
- Adela Wisdom, anti-prohibition activist

==== Primary results ====
Republican primary results
| Party | Candidate | Votes | % |
|---|---|---|---|
| Republican | Blaine Luetkemeyer (incumbent) | 80,627 | 74.8 |
| Republican | Brandon Wilkinson | 15,901 | 14.8 |
| Republican | Lynette Trares | 4,197 | 3.9 |
| Republican | Jeffrey Nowak | 3,517 | 3.3 |
| Republican | Adela Wisdom | 3,485 | 3.2 |
| Total votes | | 107,727 | 100.0 |

=== Democratic primary ===
==== Candidates ====
===== Declared =====
- Dennis Oglesby, chairman of Warren County Democrats
- Megan Rezabek, maintenance worker

==== Primary results ====
Democratic primary results
| Party | Candidate | Votes | % |
|---|---|---|---|
| Democratic | Megan Rezabek | 27,826 | 66.8 |
| Democratic | Dennis Oglesby | 13,801 | 33.2 |
| Total votes | | 41,627 | 100.0 |

=== Libertarian primary ===
==== Candidates ====
===== Declared =====
- Leonard J. Steinman II, perennial candidate

==== Primary results ====
Libertarian primary results
| Party | Candidate | Votes | % |
|---|---|---|---|
| Libertarian | Leonard J. Steinman II | 627 | 100.0 |
| Total votes | | 627 | 100.0 |

=== General election ===
==== Predictions ====
| Source | Ranking | As of |
|---|---|---|
| The Cook Political Report | Safe R | July 2, 2020 |
| Inside Elections | Safe R | June 2, 2020 |
| Sabato's Crystal Ball | Safe R | July 2, 2020 |
| Politico | Safe R | April 19, 2020 |
| Daily Kos | Safe R | June 3, 2020 |
| RCP | Safe R | June 9, 2020 |
| Niskanen | Safe R | June 7, 2020 |

==== Polling ====
| Poll source | Date(s) administered | Sample size | Margin of error | Blaine Luetkemeyer (R) | Megan Rezabek (D) | Other | Undecided |
|---|---|---|---|---|---|---|---|
| YouGov | September 24 – October 7, 2020 | 106 (LV) | – | 64% | 29% | 1% | 6% |

==== Results ====
Missouri's 3rd congressional district, 2020
| Party | Candidate | Votes | % |
|---|---|---|---|
| Republican | Blaine Luetkemeyer (incumbent) | 282,866 | 69.4 |
| Democratic | Megan Rezabek | 116,095 | 28.5 |
| Libertarian | Leonard J. Steinman II | 8,344 | 2.1 |
| Write-in | | 43 | 0.0 |
| Total votes | | 407,348 | 100.0 |
| Republican hold | | | |

== District 4 ==
2020 Missouri's 4th congressional district election
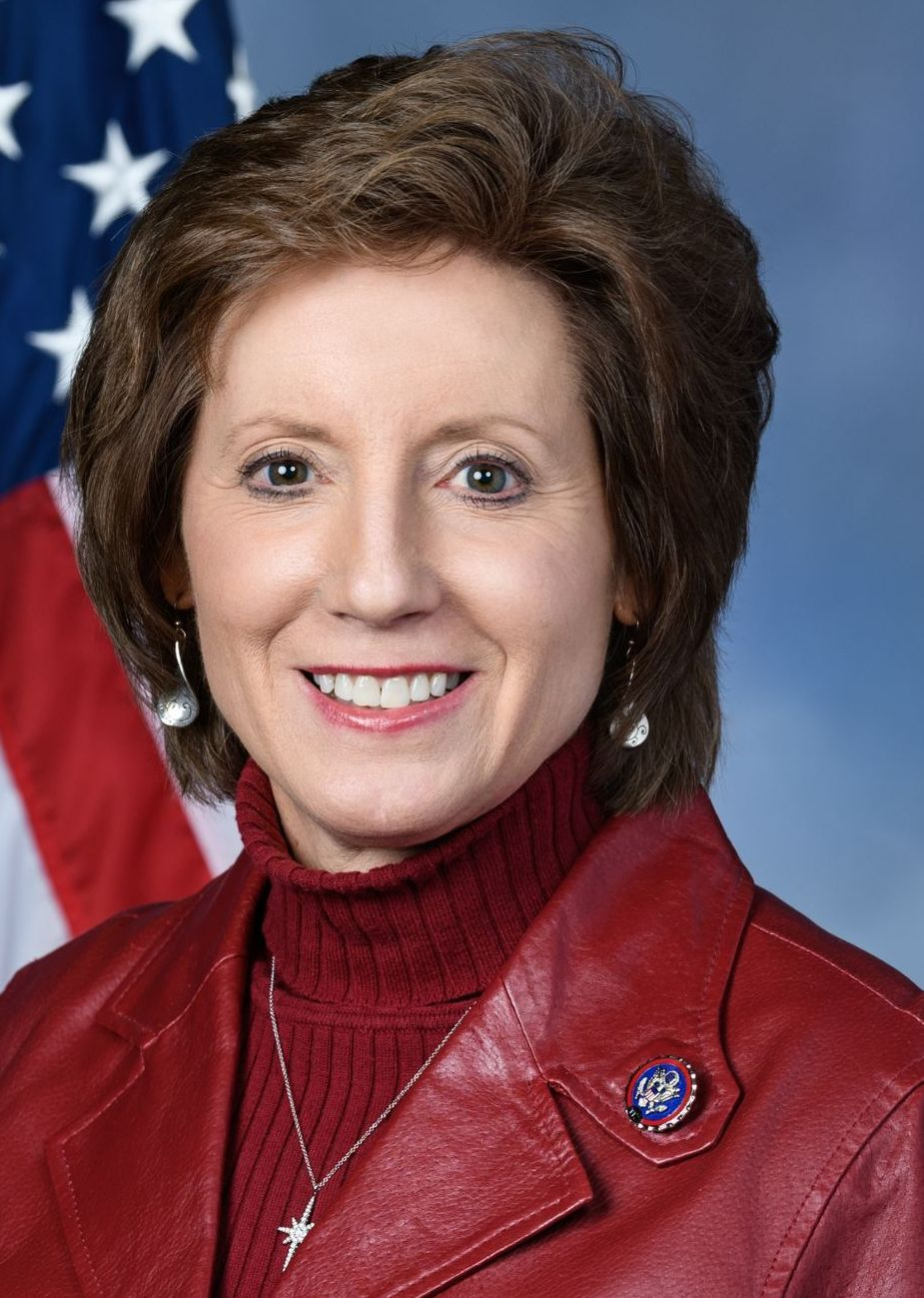

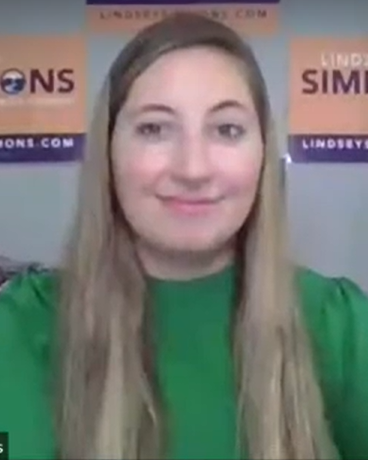
| Nominee | Vicky Hartzler | Lindsey Simmons |
| Party | Republican | Democratic |
| Popular vote | 245,247 | 107,635 |
| Percentage | 67.6% | 29.7% |
- Hartzler: 60–70% 70–80% 80–90% Simmons: 50–60%
U.S. Representative before election
Vicky Hartzler
Republican
Elected U.S. Representative
Vicky Hartzler
Republican

The 4th district is based in predominantly rural west-central Missouri, taking in Columbia, Sedalia, Warrensburg, and Lebanon. The incumbent was Republican Vicky Hartzler, who was re-elected with 64.8% of the vote in 2018.

=== Republican primary ===
==== Candidates ====
===== Declared =====
- Neal Gist, software engineer
- Vicky Hartzler, incumbent U.S. representative

==== Primary results ====
Republican primary results
| Party | Candidate | Votes | % |
|---|---|---|---|
| Republican | Vicky Hartzler (incumbent) | 80,652 | 76.6 |
| Republican | Neal Gist | 24,646 | 23.4 |
| Total votes | | 105,298 | 100.0 |

=== Democratic primary ===
==== Candidates ====
===== Declared =====
- Lindsey Simmons, attorney

==== Primary results ====
Democratic primary results
| Party | Candidate | Votes | % |
|---|---|---|---|
| Democratic | Lindsey Simmons | 38,339 | 100.0 |
| Total votes | | 38,339 | 100.0 |

=== Libertarian primary ===
==== Candidates ====
===== Declared =====
- Steven K. Koonse, retiree and Libertarian candidate for Missouri's 4th congressional district in 2018
- Robert Smith, small business owner

==== Primary results ====
Libertarian primary results
| Party | Candidate | Votes | % |
|---|---|---|---|
| Libertarian | Steven K. Koonse | 357 | 53.0 |
| Libertarian | Robert E. Smith | 316 | 47.0 |
| Total votes | | 673 | 100.0 |

=== General election ===
==== Predictions ====
| Source | Ranking | As of |
|---|---|---|
| The Cook Political Report | Safe R | July 2, 2020 |
| Inside Elections | Safe R | June 2, 2020 |
| Sabato's Crystal Ball | Safe R | July 2, 2020 |
| Politico | Safe R | April 19, 2020 |
| Daily Kos | Safe R | June 3, 2020 |
| RCP | Safe R | June 9, 2020 |
| Niskanen | Safe R | June 7, 2020 |

==== Polling ====
Polls with a sample size of <100 have their sample size entries marked in red to indicate a lack of reliability.

| Poll source | Date(s) administered | Sample size | Margin of error | Vicky Hartzler (R) | Lindsey Simmons (D) | Other | Undecided |
|---|---|---|---|---|---|---|---|
| YouGov | September 24 – October 7, 2020 | 92 (LV) | – | 53% | 37% | 6% | 5% |

==== Results ====
Missouri's 4th congressional district, 2020
| Party | Candidate | Votes | % |
|---|---|---|---|
| Republican | Vicky Hartzler (incumbent) | 245,247 | 67.6 |
| Democratic | Lindsey Simmons | 107,635 | 29.7 |
| Libertarian | Steven K. Koonse | 9,954 | 2.7 |
| Total votes | | 362,836 | 100.0 |
| Republican hold | | | |

== District 5 ==
2020 Missouri's 5th congressional district election
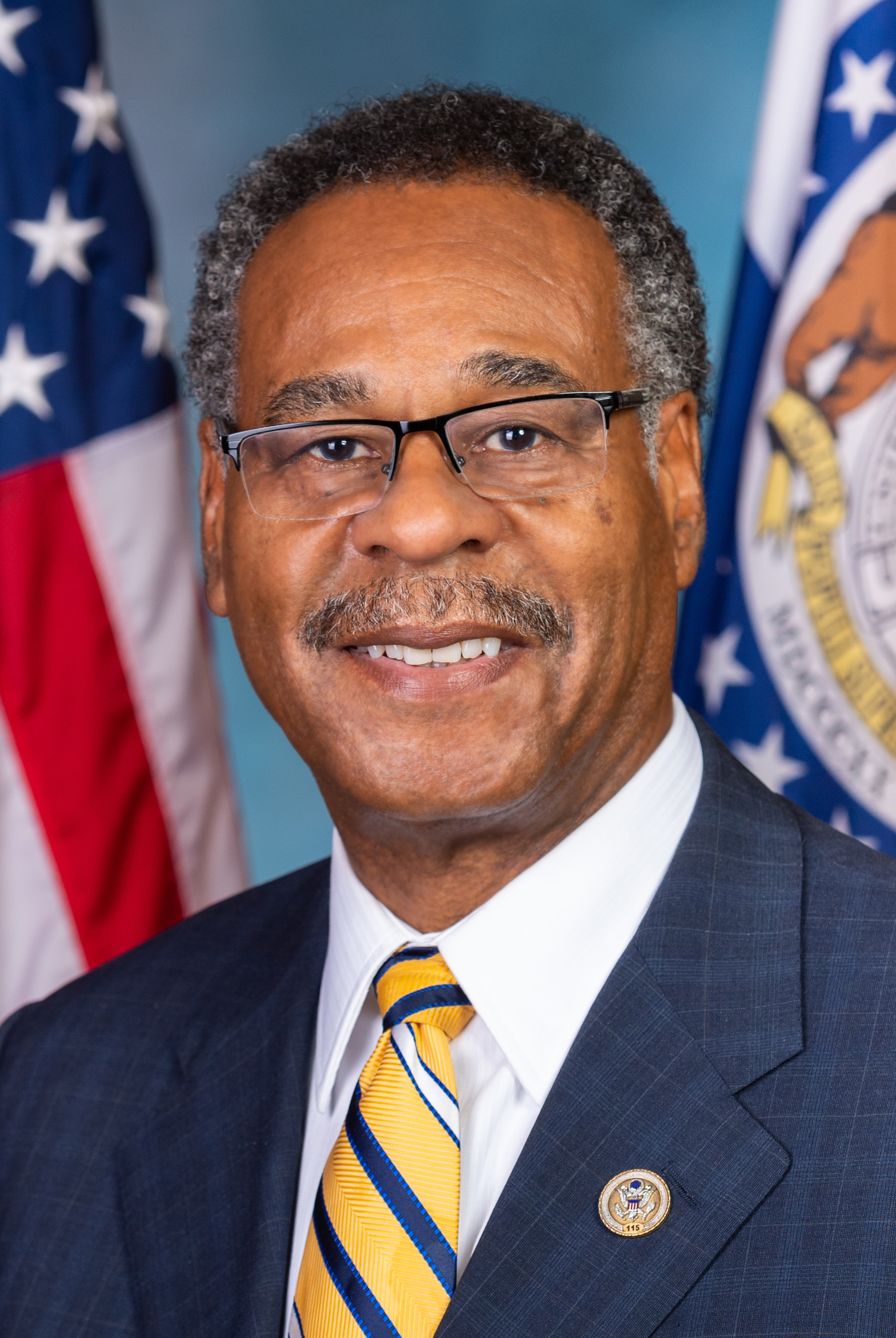

| Nominee | Emanuel Cleaver | Ryan Derks |
| Party | Democratic | Republican |
| Popular vote | 207,180 | 135,934 |
| Percentage | 58.8% | 38.6% |
- Cleaver: 50–60% 60–70% Derks: 50–60% 60–70%
U.S. Representative before election
Emanuel Cleaver
Democratic
Elected U.S. Representative
Emanuel Cleaver
Democratic

The 5th district primarily consists of the inner ring of the Kansas City metropolitan area, including nearly all of Kansas City south of the Missouri River. The incumbent was Democrat Emanuel Cleaver, who was re-elected with 61.7% of the vote in 2018.

=== Democratic primary ===
==== Candidates ====
===== Declared =====
- Emanuel Cleaver, incumbent U.S. representative
- Maite Salazar, progressive activist

==== Primary results ====
Democratic primary results
| Party | Candidate | Votes | % |
|---|---|---|---|
| Democratic | Emanuel Cleaver (incumbent) | 75,040 | 85.3 |
| Democratic | Maite Salazar | 12,923 | 14.7 |
| Total votes | | 87,963 | 100.0 |

=== Republican primary ===
==== Candidates ====
===== Declared =====
- Jerry Barham, gas station owner
- Clay Chastain, transportation activist
- Ryan Derks, investment manager
- R.H. Hess, ICWA child custody law advocate and deacon
- Richonda Oaks, analyst and dominionist
- Weldon "Wilbur" Woodward, beekeeper

==== Primary results ====
Republican primary results
| Party | Candidate | Votes | % |
|---|---|---|---|
| Republican | Ryan Derks | 13,832 | 34.0 |
| Republican | Jerry W. Barham | 12,880 | 31.7 |
| Republican | Clay Chastain | 7,519 | 18.5 |
| Republican | Weldon "Wilbur" Woodward | 2,381 | 5.8 |
| Republican | R.H. Hess | 2,207 | 5.4 |
| Republican | Richonda Oaks | 1,872 | 4.6 |
| Total votes | | 40,691 | 100.0 |

=== Libertarian primary ===
==== Candidates ====
===== Declared =====
- Robin Dominick

==== Primary results ====
Libertarian primary results
| Party | Candidate | Votes | % |
|---|---|---|---|
| Libertarian | Robin Dominick | 542 | 100.0 |
| Total votes | | 542 | 100.0 |

=== General election ===
==== Predictions ====
| Source | Ranking | As of |
|---|---|---|
| The Cook Political Report | Safe D | July 2, 2020 |
| Inside Elections | Safe D | June 2, 2020 |
| Sabato's Crystal Ball | Safe D | July 2, 2020 |
| Politico | Safe D | April 19, 2020 |
| Daily Kos | Safe D | June 3, 2020 |
| RCP | Safe D | June 9, 2020 |
| Niskanen | Safe D | June 7, 2020 |

==== Polling ====
| Poll source | Date(s) administered | Sample size | Margin of error | Emmanuel Cleaver (D) | Ryan Derks (R) | Other | Undecided |
|---|---|---|---|---|---|---|---|
| YouGov | September 24 – October 7, 2020 | 135 (LV) | – | 59% | 26% | 1% | 7% |

==== Results ====
Missouri's 5th congressional district, 2020
| Party | Candidate | Votes | % |
|---|---|---|---|
| Democratic | Emanuel Cleaver (incumbent) | 207,180 | 58.8 |
| Republican | Ryan Derks | 135,934 | 38.6 |
| Libertarian | Robin Dominick | 9,272 | 2.6 |
| Write-in | | 44 | 0.0 |
| Total votes | | 352,430 | 100.0 |
| Democratic hold | | | |

== District 6 ==
2020 Missouri's 6th congressional district election
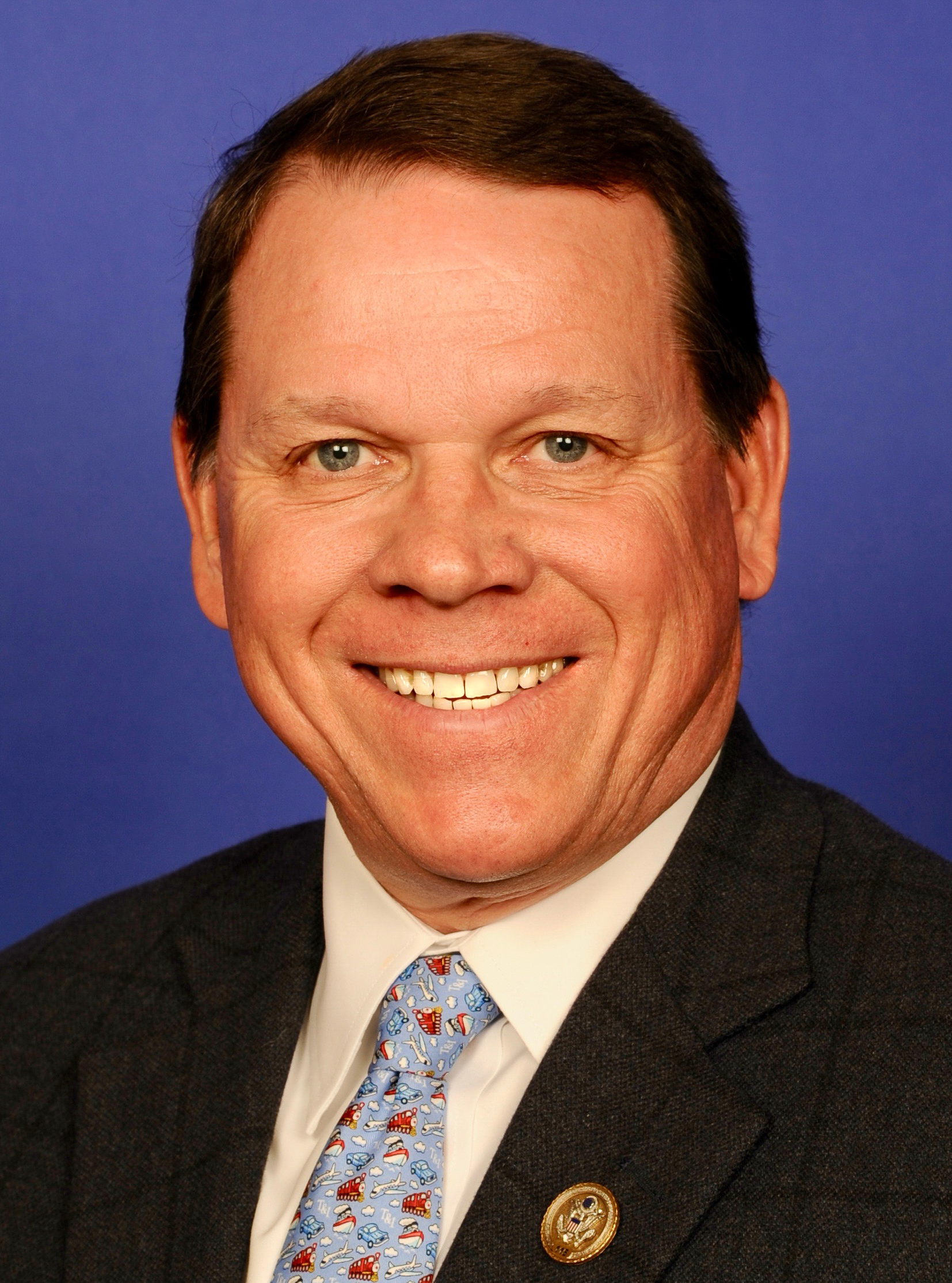

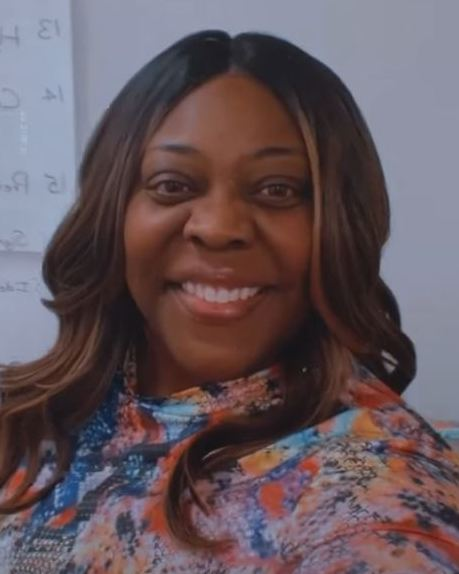
| Nominee | Sam Graves | Gena Ross |
| Party | Republican | Democratic |
| Popular vote | 258,709 | 118,926 |
| Percentage | 67.1% | 30.8% |
- Graves: 50–60% 60–70% 70–80% 80–90%
U.S. Representative before election
Sam Graves
Republican
Elected U.S. Representative
Sam Graves
Republican

The 6th district encompasses rural northern Missouri, St. Joseph and much of Kansas City north of the Missouri River. The incumbent was Republican Sam Graves, who was re-elected with 65.4% of the vote in 2018.

=== Republican primary ===
==== Candidates ====
===== Declared =====
- Sam Graves, incumbent U.S. representative
- Chris Ryan, perennial candidate

==== Primary results ====
Republican primary results
| Party | Candidate | Votes | % |
|---|---|---|---|
| Republican | Sam Graves (incumbent) | 81,584 | 79.7 |
| Republican | Chris Ryan | 20,826 | 20.3 |
| Total votes | | 102,410 | 100.0 |

=== Democratic primary ===
==== Candidates ====
===== Declared =====
- Ramona Farris, consultant
- Henry Martin, U.S. Army veteran
- Gena L. Ross, college professor
- Donald Robert Sartain
- Charles West, Clark County school board member

==== Primary results ====
Democratic primary results
| Party | Candidate | Votes | % |
|---|---|---|---|
| Democratic | Gena L. Ross | 14,503 | 32.8 |
| Democratic | Ramona Farris | 11,882 | 26.9 |
| Democratic | Henry Martin | 9,393 | 21.3 |
| Democratic | Charles West | 6,951 | 15.7 |
| Democratic | Donald Robert Sartain | 1,447 | 3.3 |
| Total votes | | 44,176 | 100.0 |

=== Libertarian primary ===
==== Candidates ====
===== Declared =====
- Jim Higgins, former vice chairman of the Missouri Libertarian Party

==== Primary results ====
Libertarian primary results
| Party | Candidate | Votes | % |
|---|---|---|---|
| Libertarian | Jim Higgins | 431 | 100.0 |
| Total votes | | 431 | 100.0 |

=== General election ===
==== Predictions ====
| Source | Ranking | As of |
|---|---|---|
| The Cook Political Report | Safe R | July 2, 2020 |
| Inside Elections | Safe R | June 2, 2020 |
| Sabato's Crystal Ball | Safe R | July 2, 2020 |
| Politico | Safe R | April 19, 2020 |
| Daily Kos | Safe R | June 3, 2020 |
| RCP | Safe R | June 9, 2020 |
| Niskanen | Safe R | June 7, 2020 |

==== Polling ====
Polls with a sample size of <100 have their sample size entries marked in red to indicate a lack of reliability.

| Poll source | Date(s) administered | Sample size | Margin of error | Sam Graves (R) | Gena Ross (D) | Other | Undecided |
|---|---|---|---|---|---|---|---|
| YouGov | September 24 – October 7, 2020 | 98 (LV) | – | 58% | 36% | 1% | 6% |

==== Results ====
Missouri's 6th congressional district, 2020
| Party | Candidate | Votes | % |
|---|---|---|---|
| Republican | Sam Graves (incumbent) | 258,709 | 67.1 |
| Democratic | Gena Ross | 118,926 | 30.8 |
| Libertarian | Jim Higgins | 8,144 | 2.1 |
| Total votes | | 385,779 | 100.0 |
| Republican hold | | | |

== District 7 ==
2020 Missouri's 7th congressional district election
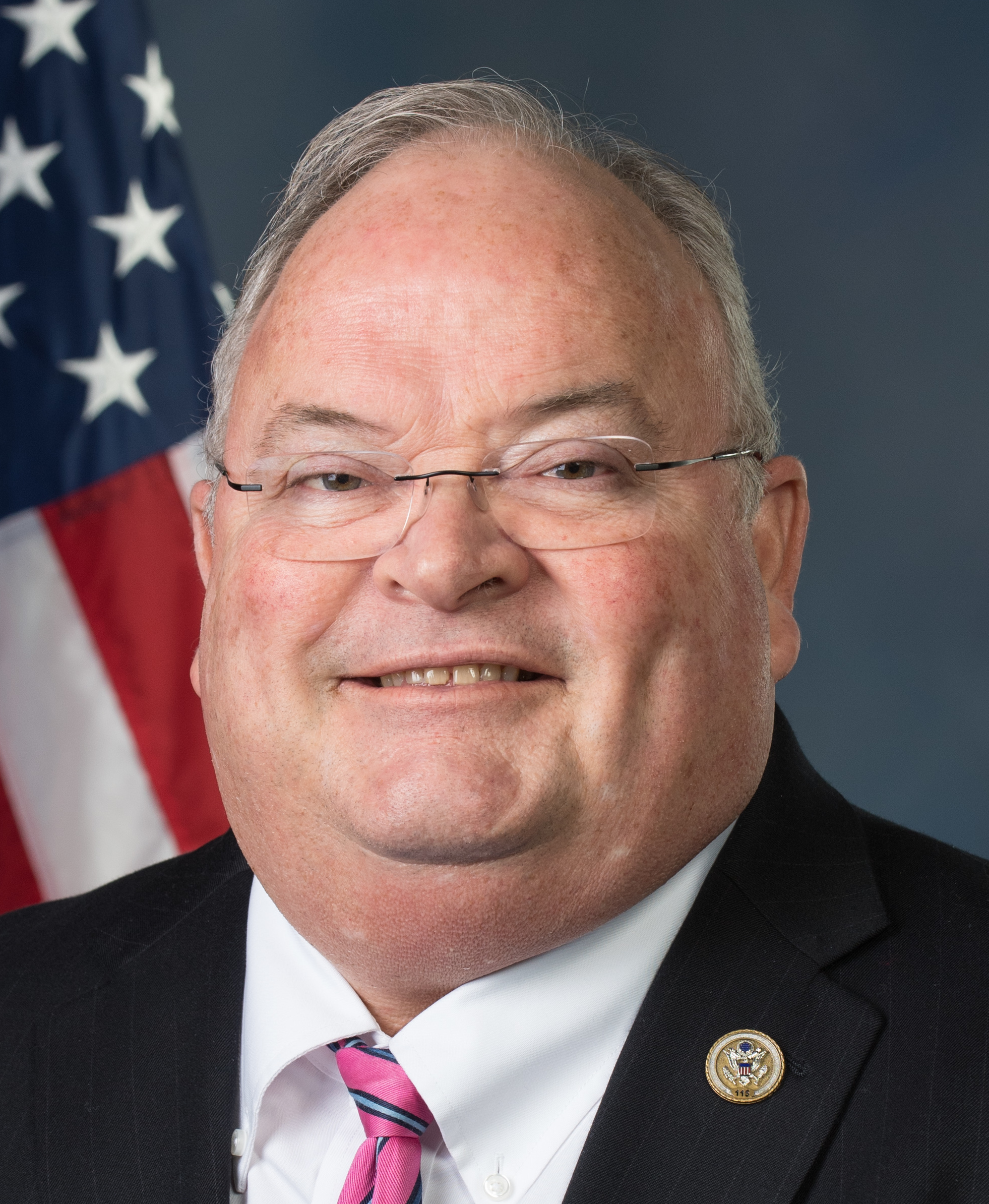

| Nominee | Billy Long | Teresa Montseny |
| Party | Republican | Democratic |
| Popular vote | 254,318 | 98,111 |
| Percentage | 68.9% | 26.6% |
- County results Long: 50–60% 70–80% 80–90%
U.S. Representative before election
Billy Long
Republican
Elected U.S. Representative
Billy Long
Republican

The 7th district is located in southwestern Missouri, taking in Springfield, Joplin, Branson, and Nixa. The incumbent was Republican Billy Long, who was re-elected with 66.2% of the vote in 2018.

=== Republican primary ===
==== Candidates ====
===== Declared =====
- Steve Chetnik, manufacturing worker
- Eric Harleman, businessman
- Camille Lombardi-Olive, perennial candidate
- Billy Long, incumbent U.S. representative
- Kevin VanStory, real estate broker

==== Primary results ====
Republican primary results
| Party | Candidate | Votes | % |
|---|---|---|---|
| Republican | Billy Long (incumbent) | 69,407 | 66.1 |
| Republican | Eric Harleman | 11,696 | 11.1 |
| Republican | Kevin VanStory | 10,486 | 10.0 |
| Republican | Steve Chetnik | 7,407 | 7.1 |
| Republican | Camille Lombardi-Olive | 5,969 | 5.7 |
| Total votes | | 104,965 | 100.0 |

=== Democratic primary ===
==== Candidates ====
===== Declared =====
- Teresa Montseny, historian (dropped out)

==== Primary results ====
Democratic primary results
| Party | Candidate | Votes | % |
|---|---|---|---|
| Democratic | Teresa Montseny | 30,568 | 100.0 |
| Total votes | | 30,568 | 100.0 |

=== Libertarian primary ===
==== Candidates ====
===== Declared =====
- Kevin Craig

==== Primary results ====
Libertarian primary results
| Party | Candidate | Votes | % |
|---|---|---|---|
| Libertarian | Kevin Craig | 508 | 100.0 |
| Total votes | | 508 | 100.0 |

=== General election ===
==== Predictions ====
| Source | Ranking | As of |
|---|---|---|
| The Cook Political Report | Safe R | July 2, 2020 |
| Inside Elections | Safe R | June 2, 2020 |
| Sabato's Crystal Ball | Safe R | July 2, 2020 |
| Politico | Safe R | April 19, 2020 |
| Daily Kos | Safe R | June 3, 2020 |
| RCP | Safe R | June 9, 2020 |
| Niskanen | Safe R | June 7, 2020 |

==== Polling ====
| Poll source | Date(s) administered | Sample size | Margin of error | Billy Long (R) | Teresa Montseny (D) | Other | Undecided |
|---|---|---|---|---|---|---|---|
| YouGov | September 24 – October 7, 2020 | 142 (LV) | – | 57% | 32% | 2% | 10% |

==== Results ====
Missouri's 7th congressional district, 2020
| Party | Candidate | Votes | % |
|---|---|---|---|
| Republican | Billy Long (incumbent) | 254,318 | 68.9 |
| Democratic | Teresa Montseny | 98,111 | 26.6 |
| Libertarian | Kevin Craig | 15,573 | 4.2 |
| Independent | Audrey Richards (write-in) | 1,279 | 0.3 |
| Write-in | | 2 | 0.0 |
| Total votes | | 369,283 | 100.0 |
| Republican hold | | | |

== District 8 ==
2020 Missouri's 8th congressional district election
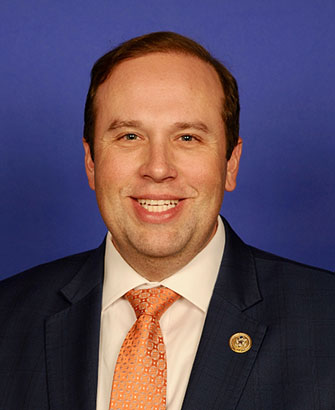

| Nominee | Jason Smith | Kathy Ellis |
| Party | Republican | Democratic |
| Popular vote | 253,811 | 70,561 |
| Percentage | 76.9% | 21.4% |
- Smith: 60–70% 70–80% 80–90%
U.S. Representative before election
Jason Smith
Republican
Elected U.S. Representative
Jason Smith
Republican

The 8th district is the most rural district of Missouri, taking in rural southeastern Missouri, including the Missouri Bootheel, as well as the cities of Cape Girardeau and Poplar Bluff. The incumbent was Republican Jason Smith, who was re-elected with 73.4% of the vote in 2018.

=== Republican primary ===
==== Candidates ====
===== Declared =====
- Jason Smith, incumbent U.S. representative

==== Primary results ====
Republican primary results
| Party | Candidate | Votes | % |
|---|---|---|---|
| Republican | Jason Smith (incumbent) | 114,074 | 100.0 |
| Total votes | | 114,074 | 100.0 |

=== Democratic primary ===
==== Candidates ====
===== Declared =====
- Kathy Ellis, social worker and nominee for Missouri's 8th congressional district in 2018

==== Primary results ====
Democratic primary results
| Party | Candidate | Votes | % |
|---|---|---|---|
| Democratic | Kathryn Ellis | 20,354 | 100.0 |
| Total votes | | 20,354 | 100.0 |

=== Libertarian primary ===
==== Candidates ====
===== Declared =====
- Tom Schmitz

==== Primary results ====
Libertarian primary results
| Party | Candidate | Votes | % |
|---|---|---|---|
| Libertarian | Tom Schmitz | 265 | 100.0 |
| Total votes | | 265 | 100.0 |

=== General election ===
==== Predictions ====
| Source | Ranking | As of |
|---|---|---|
| The Cook Political Report | Safe R | July 2, 2020 |
| Inside Elections | Safe R | June 2, 2020 |
| Sabato's Crystal Ball | Safe R | July 2, 2020 |
| Politico | Safe R | April 19, 2020 |
| Daily Kos | Safe R | June 3, 2020 |
| RCP | Safe R | June 9, 2020 |
| Niskanen | Safe R | June 7, 2020 |

==== Polling ====
Polls with a sample size of <100 have their sample size entries marked in red to indicate a lack of reliability.

| Poll source | Date(s) administered | Sample size | Margin of error | Jason Smith (R) | Kathy Ellis (D) | Other | Undecided |
|---|---|---|---|---|---|---|---|
| YouGov | September 24 – October 7, 2020 | 96 (LV) | – | 72% | 22% | 5% | 2% |

==== Results ====
Missouri's 8th congressional district, 2020
| Party | Candidate | Votes | % |
|---|---|---|---|
| Republican | Jason Smith (incumbent) | 253,811 | 76.9 |
| Democratic | Kathy Ellis | 70,561 | 21.4 |
| Libertarian | Tom Schmitz | 5,854 | 1.8 |
| Total votes | | 330,226 | 100.0 |
| Republican hold | | | |

== Notes ==
Partisan clients
