= The Gainesville Sun =

American daily newspaper in Gainesville, Florida

- The March 22, 2009 front page of The Gainesville Sun
- Type: Daily newspaper
- Format: Broadsheet
- Owner: USA Today Co.
- Publisher: Rynni Henderson (2019–present)
- Editor: Douglas Ray
- Founded: July 1876; 150 years ago
- Headquarters: 2700 SW 13th St. Gainesville, Florida 32608-2015; United States; 29°37′37″N 82°20′25″W
- Circulation: 14,389
- ISSN: 0163-4925
- Website: www.gainesville.com

The Gainesville Sun is a newspaper published daily in Gainesville, Florida, United States, covering the North-Central portion of the state.

== History ==
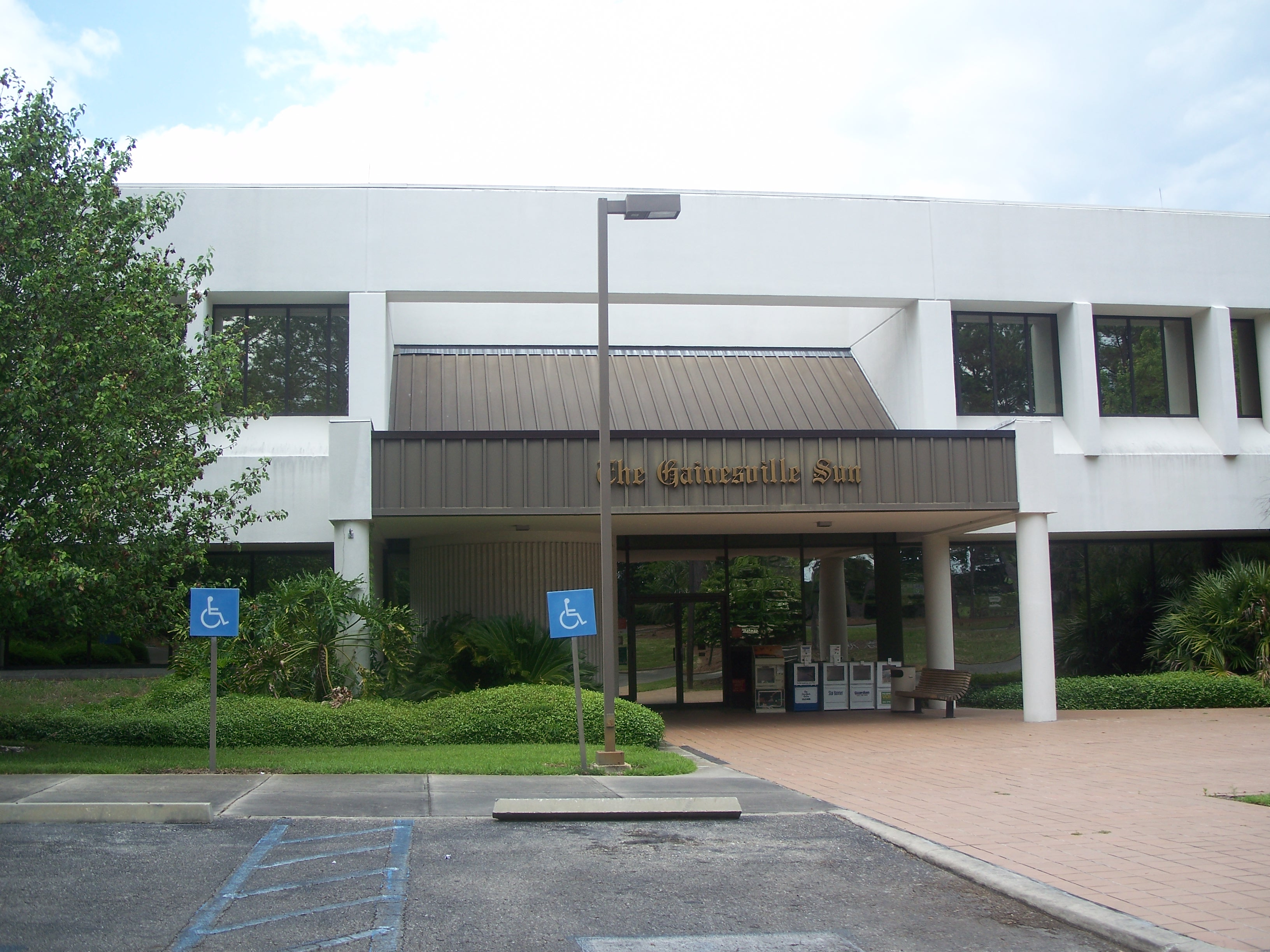

The paper was founded in July 1876 as the Gainesville Times, by brothers E. M. and William Wade Hampton, and was renamed as The Gainesville Sun in February 1879. The paper was first printed on July 6, 1876. It went through a series of ownership and name changes in the 1880s and 1890s, first being consolidated with Henry Hamilton McCreary's Weekly Bee as the Gainesville Sun and Bee, then as the Gainesville Daily Sun, and finally back to The Gainesville Sun. The Alachua Advocate was another weekly newspaper owned by McCreary, and when it closed in 1889, it was merged into The Gainesville Sun.

It was bought by W. M. Pepper Sr. in 1917 for $50,000 and was published by the Pepper family for three generations, until it was sold to the Cowles Media Company in 1962. During the time it was owned by the Pepper family (specifically in 1922) an editor at the paper openly admitted his membership in the Ku Klux Klan and praised the Klan in print. An editorial published in the paper following the Rosewood massacre justified the actions of the whites, saying "Let it be understood now and forever that he, whether white or black, who brutally assaults an innocent and helpless woman, shall die the death of a dog." Conversely, The Tampa Tribune of the time called it "a lasting blot on the people of Levy County", clearly condemning rather than justifying the massacre.

In 1971, it was sold to The New York Times Company. On January 6, 2012, The Gainesville Sun was purchased by Halifax Media Group. In 2015, Halifax was acquired by New Media Investment Group.

An online edition was launched in 1995, initially called SunOne, and later simply GainesvilleSun.com. The website is now known as Gainesville.com. In 2005, it launched The Gainesville Guardian, a weekly paper aimed at East Gainesville and the city's African-American population, to mixed opinions.

== Awards ==
The Gainesville Sun has won two Pulitzer Prizes: publisher John R. Harrison won in 1966 for his campaign for better housing codes, and editorialist Horance G. "Buddy" Davis Jr. won in 1971 for his editorials in support of peaceful desegregation of the local school system.
