= Alameda Science and Technology Institute =

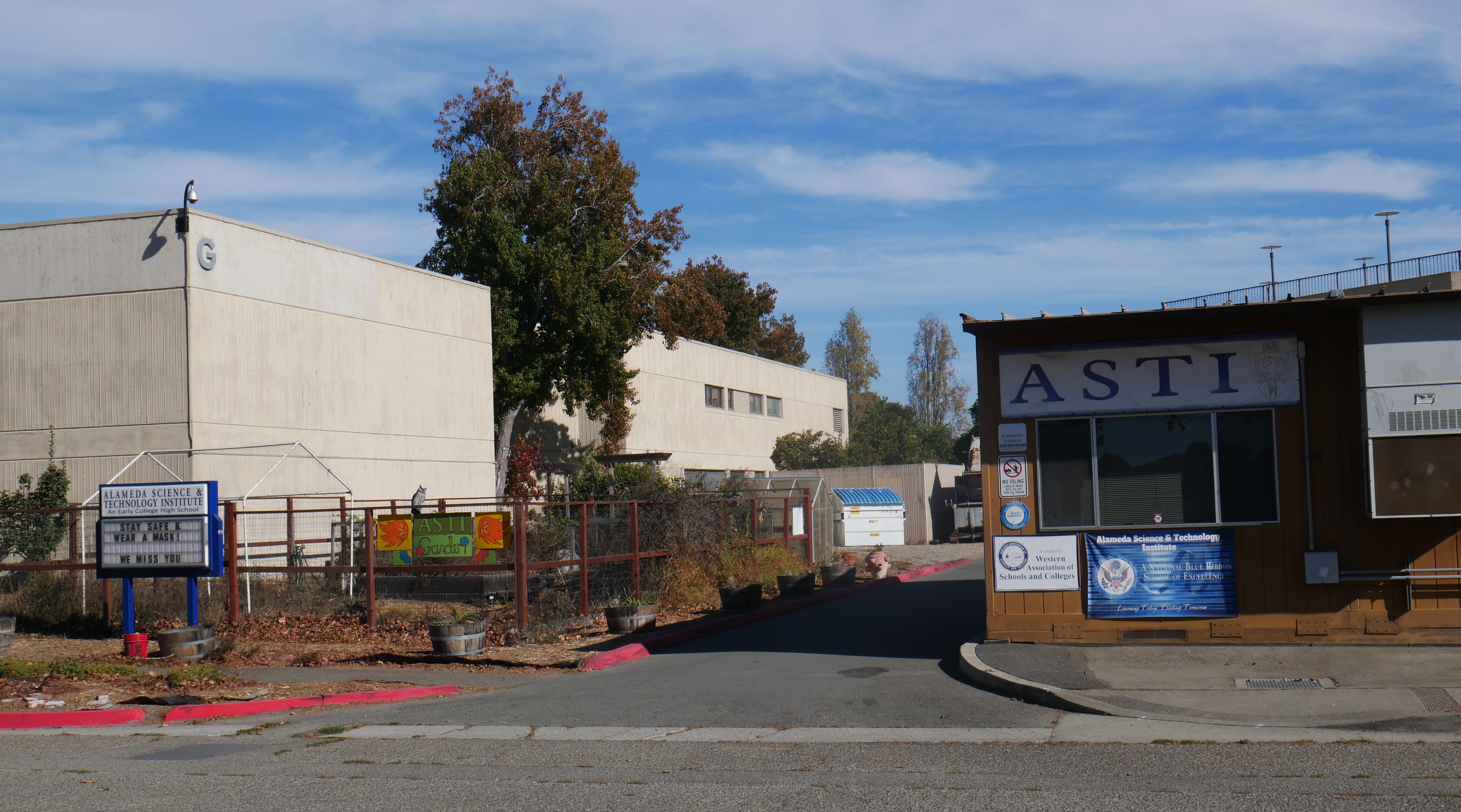

Location
- 555 Ralph Appezzatto Memorial Parkway (Atlantic Avenue); Alameda, California 94501; United States; 37.78178°N 122.28027°W

Information
- Type: Early college high school
- Established: 2004; 22 years ago
- School district: Alameda Unified School District
- Principal: Tracy Corbally
- Staff: 6.51 (FTE)
- Grades: 9-12
- Enrollment: 167 (2023–2024)
- Student to teacher ratio: 25.65
- Mascot: Phoenix
- Accreditation: Blue Ribbon
- Website: asti.alamedaunified.org

The Alameda Science and Technology Institute (ASTI) is an early college high school in Alameda, California, United States.

== School description ==
Alameda Science and Technology Institute is located on the campus of the College of Alameda in Alameda's West End neighborhood. First opened in 2004, ASTI is a collaboration between Alameda Unified School District (AUSD) and the College of Alameda. ASTI was planned and conceived as a small high school providing a college preparatory curriculum to students living in the San Francisco Bay Area. Students earn two years of college credit during their junior and senior years.

== Physical plant ==
Originally located in an abandoned upholstery shop at the College of Alameda, in 2006 ASTI installed the last of seven modular buildings, achieving autonomy as a high school co-located on a college campus. In 2007–2008, ASTI created a new science lab classroom and a new technology lab. In 2013–14, ASTI added a school garden adjacent to the College of Alameda gym. In 2015-16 a permanent school sign was installed in front of the school garden.

== Governance structure ==
From its inception in 2004 until 2008, a series of four principals oversaw ASTI; from 2008 to 2011 it functioned under a teacher-leader model. Operations were overseen by the teacher-leader, and a district liaison helped resolve larger issues. In 2011 the teacher-leader was named "principal". AUSD and ASTI staff cooperate jointly to help direct the program, working closely with a college liaison who serves as a dean at the community college.

== State and district requirements ==
Alameda Science and Technology has defined an "ASTI Course of Study" that aligns Alameda Unified School District and State of California graduation requirements with the requirements of the College of Alameda required for transfer to four-year universities. ASTI emphasizes a freshman and sophomore core curriculum that supports student preparation for college preparation through enrollment in courses that concentrate on transfer of skills in reading, writing, speaking and critical thinking. ASTI ensures all students are involved in challenging learning experiences through its deliberate focus on rigorous and accelerated instruction in a well-defined academic course of study. The ASTI curriculum explicitly provides for reinforcement of literacy in areas that are crucial to college success. Through its concentration on writing and speaking, ASTI prepares its students with the skills necessary to promote college-level language production and content presentation. Students are involved in a strand of interdisciplinary projects that align disparate subject areas: in this manner, ASTI teachers scaffold and structure student learning experiences to consciously aim at individual assignments and group projects of increasing difficulty and progressing complexity.

== Awards and recognition ==
In 2016, ASTI was awarded its second consecutive six-year accreditation term from the Western Association of Schools and Colleges.

In September 2015, ASTI was announced as one of 335 schools nationwide to receive prestigious National Blue Ribbon School recognition.

== API performance ==
Year	API score
2005	805
2006	877
2007	829
2008	849
2009	844
2010	842
2011	895
2012	896
2013	924
