= Hampton (given name) =

Hampton is a male given name. Notable people with this name include:

- Hampton L. Carson (biologist) (1914–2004), American biologist
- Hampton L. Carson (lawyer) (1852–1929), American lawyer, legal scholar, and historian
- Hampton Charles, pseudonym of Roy Peter Martin (1931–2014) writing three of the Miss Seeton mysteries
- Hampton J. Cheney (1836–1927), American Confederate soldier and politician
- Hampton E. Boggs (1921–1953), American fighter pilot and flying ace of World War II
- Hampton Del Ruth (1879–1958), American film actor, director, screenwriter, and producer
- Hampton Dellinger (born 1967), American attorney
- Hampton Fancher (born 1938), American actor, screenwriter, and filmmaker
- Hampton Fluker (born 1990), American actor
- Hampton P. Fulmer (1875–1944), American politician in South Carolina
- Hampton Gleeson (1834–1907), pastoralist and politician in the young colony of South Australia
- Hampton Hawes (1928–1977), American jazz pianist
- Hampton Jarnagin (1811/1812–1887), American lawyer, judge, and state legislator
- Hampton Lemoine (1882–1916), American college football player and physician
- Hampton Lintorn-Catlin (born 1982), American computer programmer and programming language inventor
- Hampton Morris (born 2004), American weightlifter
- Hampton Wildman Parker (1897–1968), English zoologist
- Hampton "Hamp" Pool (1915–2000), American gridiron football player, coach, and scout
- Hampton Sides (born 1962), American historian, author and journalist
- Hampton Smith (1934–2023), American college football and baseball coach
- Hampton Slukynsky (born 2005), American ice hockey player
- Hampton S. Thomas (1837–1899), American soldier and medal of honor recipient
- Hampton Yount (born 1984), American stand-up comedian, writer, and actor
- Hampton W. Wall (1831–1898), American businessman and politician in Illinois
- Hampton Weekes (1880–1948), Archdeacon of the Isle of Wight

== See also ==
- Hampton (surname)
- Hampton (disambiguation)
