= Tracy McCreery =

American politician (born 1966)

Member of the Missouri Senate from the 24th district
- Incumbent
- Assumed office January 4, 2023
- Preceded by: Jill Schupp

Member of the Missouri House of Representatives from the 88th district
- In office January 4, 2015 – January 4, 2023
- Preceded by: Jill Schupp
- Succeeded by: Holly Jones

Personal details
- Born: December 26, 1966 (age 59) Norwalk, Ohio, U.S.
- Party: Democratic (2012-present); Independent (until 2011); Republican (previously)

Tracy McCreery (born December 26, 1966) is an American politician. She is a member of the Missouri Senate from the 24th district, serving since 2023. She previously represented the 88th district in the Missouri House of Representatives from 2015 to 2023, and the 83rd district between 2011 and 2013. Originally elected in a special election as an independent, she is a member of the Democratic Party.

== Early life and education ==
McCreery attended Edison High School in Milan, Ohio and graduated from Ohio State University in 1989 with a Bachelor of Science degree in marketing.

McCreery says she was once a pro-choice Republican, and left the party to support women's bodily autonomy.

== Career ==
McCreery previously worked for Joan Bray and served in the administration of governor Bob Holden.

== Electoral history ==
=== State representative ===
Missouri House of Representatives, November 8, 2011, district 83
Party	Candidate	Votes	%	±%
Independent	Tracy McCreery	1,647	43.9%	
Democratic	Jeff O'Connell	1,096	29.2%	
Republican	Patrick Brennan	1,005	26.8%	
Total votes		12,704	100.00%	

Missouri House of Representatives, November 4, 2014, district 88
Party	Candidate	Votes	%	±%
Democratic	Tracy McCreery	6,920	54.47%	
Republican	Raymond Chandler	5,784	45.53%	
Total votes		12,704	100.00%	

Missouri House of Representatives Election, November 8, 2016, district 88
Party	Candidate	Votes	%	±%
Democratic	Tracy McCreery	12,891	71.68%	+17.21
Libertarian	Steven Robnak	5,092	28.32%	+28.32
Total votes		17,983	100.00%	

Missouri House of Representatives Election, November 6, 2018, district 88
Party	Candidate	Votes	%	±%
Democratic	Tracy McCreery	12,005	63.03%	−8.65
Republican	Lloyd Nolan	6,761	35.50%	+35.50
Libertarian	Stephen Johnson	281	1.47%	−26.85
Total votes		19,047	100.00%	

Missouri House of Representatives Election, November 3, 2020, district 88
Party	Candidate	Votes	%	±%
Democratic	Tracy McCreery	13,924	62.79%	−0.24
Republican	Karen Pujji	7,855	35.42%	−0.08
Libertarian	Stephen Johnson	397	1.79%	+0.32
Total votes		22,176	100.00%	

=== State Senate ===
Missouri Senate Election, November 8, 2022, district 24
Party	Candidate	Votes	%	±%
Democratic	Tracy McCreery	43,081	53.37%	
Republican	George J. Hruza	36,164	44.80%	
Libertarian	LaDonna Higgins	1,481	1.83%	
Total votes		80,726	100.00%	
