= Encinal High School =

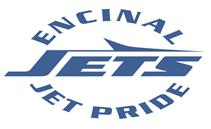

Location
- 210 Central Avenue; Alameda, California 94501; United States; 37°46′22.7″N 122°17′21.37″W

Information
- Type: Public high school
- Motto: Go Jets!
- Established: 1952
- Principal: Kirstin Snyder (interim)
- Teaching staff: 52.15 (FTE)
- Grades: 6-12
- Enrollment: 1,218 (2023–2024)
- Student to teacher ratio: 23.36
- Colors: Royal blue and white
- Mascot: Jet
- Website: encinal.alamedaunified.org

Encinal High School is a co-educational public high school serving grades 6–12. It is located in Alameda, California, United States, and is part of the Alameda Unified School District.

Most students come from the Academy of Alameda (formerly Chipman Middle School) or Wood Middle School.

== Threatened closure ==
The school was one of several in the Alameda district that was said to face closure depending on the success or failure of Measure E, a $150-per-parcel property tax increase voted on by mail-in ballot. Measure E was defeated when it failed to garner the required two-thirds majority; however, the school did reopen in the fall of 2010.

== Demographics ==
In the 2005-2006 school year, the student body was 23% African-American, 20% White non-Hispanic, 39% Asian, 15% Hispanic or Latino, 1% American Indian or Alaskan Native, 1% Pacific Islander, and 1% multiple ethnicity or no response.

== College and work preparation ==
- Encinal High School has an Academic Performance Index of 7/10. However, when compared to socioeconomically similar schools, its API is a 9/10.
- Encinal is the only high school in the city of Alameda to have open-enrollment AP classes.
- Encinal High School shared its campus with the Alameda Community Learning Center but since the 2013–2014 school year it has shared the space with the Junior Jets (a 6–8 middle school)
- Encinal High School has an armory below its gym, where JROTC used to be taught.

== Student budget protests ==
=== April 1, 2010 budget teach-in ===
On April 1, 2010, about 200 students attending Encinal High School staged a "teach-in" protest in light of possible further budget cuts from the AUSD and closure of the school. Teachers and students planned a series of classes that were divided into two sessions with a break in between that included free food (from the Barbeque Club) and live music from certain Encinal staff members. Most of the classes were led by teachers, but two were taught by seniors (including a "no boundaries" music class led by Matt Ortega). The students who attended showcased their Jet Pride by participating in a variety of unique classes including how to make salt water taffy through chemistry, protest poetry and art, a music class with no musical boundaries, and cow eyeball dissection. A small point that the coordinators of this event wanted to get across was the date that was chosen for it: April 1, 2010 was the Thursday before Encinal's spring break began.

=== March 2008 student walkouts ===
On March 5, 2008, about 1,000 students from Encinal High School walked out of class to protest the budget cuts for the 2008–2009 school year. The budget cuts were a result of the $4 billion budget cut approved by California governor Arnold Schwarzenegger. The cuts would eliminate many school sports and Advanced Placement classes, and lay off about 46 teachers. The walkout began at Encinal High where students marched to the Alameda Unified School District (AUSD) offices located on the Alameda High campus, where the 1,000 Encinal students were joined by many more students from Alameda High. After about a half-hour of chanting protests outside the District offices, AUSD superintendent Ardella Dailey invited the walking out students into the Kofman Auditorium to try to explain why the cuts were required.

Text messaging technology, as well as social networking sites, such as MySpace, Facebook, and YouTube, helped the students coordinate and announce the walkout. Before they reached the district office, many Encinal students text messaged students at Alameda High. Aware of the walkout only when the Encinal students reached the district office, Alameda High officials were unable to prevent their students from leaving class. They were all marked with cleared absences.

== Other student activities ==
=== North Coast Section titles in Football ===
- 1980 – Encinal defeated St. Patrick 21–3
- 2008 – Encinal defeated Novato 35–28

The Jets are a member of the West Alameda County Conference (WACC 12).

Encinal High, Alameda High School, and St. Joseph Notre Dame High School collectively field men's and women's rugby union teams.

=== Partnership with Jetsetters ===
Jetsetters has partnered up with Encinal to provide ROP classes for students such as Drivers' Education, Dancing, and Arts & Crafts. They also have an after school program designed to help students in need.

=== Marching band ===
The Encinal High Jets band, the Marching Jets, is led by Band Director Anthony Gennaro. Throughout the year, the musicians compete in band reviews all over Northern California and hold the Island Winterguard show every March. During the 2005–2006 school year, the band placed in the top three in every review they entered. During the 2016–2017 school year, the band took first place in their division at every review they attended, including taking first place at the Santa Cruz Band Review for the third year in a row.

=== Drama ===
Encinal High School dramatic arts program was run by Robert Moorhead until his retirement in 2016. The drama department has performed Les Misérables, Hamlet, and The Sound of Music. In the spring of 2006 Encinal High performed Cats. In the winter of 2007, Encinal High School performed Twelve Angry Men. In 2008 they performed Angels in America. They were the first high school to do so. They also performed Carousel. In 2009 they became one of the first schools in the country to perform the school edition of Rent. In 2010 they performed the classic musical West Side Story. In 2011 they performed their version of Seussical, a Dr. Seuss musical. In 2012 they performed the classic musical Anything Goes. In 2013 they performed a high school version of the musical Hair, although without the nudity of the traditional version. In 2014 they performed the musical Hairspray. In 2015 they performed In the Heights. In 2016 they performed Annie.

The TV show MythBusters sometimes used the school's facilities in its experiments, including the pool and football field. In December 2009 President Obama posed for a photo with Jamie Hyneman and Adam Savage from the show while holding an Encinal Jets hooded sweatshirt. Hyneman's spouse Eileen Walsh was a teacher at the school.

=== FM radio station ===
Encinal High students operate the low-power FM radio station KJTZ-LP.

=== Mascot ===
The school mascot is a Marine Corps A-4 Skyhawk attack jet, a tribute to the military heritage of the town and to the now-closed Naval Air Station on the west end of the island. In 2004 there was a dispute as to whether the mascot symbolized war, and some people wanted to have it removed. The jet was not removed, after a show of support from the students and the community.

=== Student Government ===
The Encinal ASB team

== Notable alumni ==
- Mel Carver — former football player for the University of Nevada, Las Vegas, Tampa Bay Buccaneers, and Indianapolis Colts
- Ray Crouse — former football player for the University of Nevada, Las Vegas, Green Bay Packers, Calgary Stampeders, and BC Lions
- Tommy Harper — former baseball player for the Cincinnati Reds, Cleveland Indians, Seattle Pilots, Milwaukee Brewers, Boston Red Sox, California Angels, Oakland Athletics, and Baltimore Orioles; former baseball coach the Red Sox and Montreal Expos; Boston Red Sox Hall of Fame inductee
- Jack Haven — actor
- Osiris Johnson — former baseball player in the Miami Marlins farm system
- Curt Motton — former baseball player for the Baltimore Orioles, Milwaukee Brewers, and California Angels; 1970 World Series champion
- Fizzy Qwick (Class of 1971), recording artist and songwriter
- Isaiah Rider — former basketball player for the University of Nevada, Las Vegas, Minnesota Timberwolves, Portland Trail Blazers, Atlanta Hawks, Los Angeles Lakers, and Denver Nuggets; 1994 Slam Dunk Contest champion
- Jimmy Rollins — former baseball player for the Philadelphia Phillies, Los Angeles Dodgers, and Chicago White Sox; 2007 NL Most Valuable Player; 2008 World Series champion
- Willie Stargell — former baseball player for the Pittsburgh Pirates; National Baseball Hall of Fame inductee (Class of 1988); 1971 and 1979 World Series champion; 1979 NL Most Valuable Player
- Junior Tautalatasi — former football player for Washington State University (NCAA Division I-A), Philadelphia Eagles, and Dallas Cowboys
- Dontrelle Willis — former baseball pitcher for the Florida Marlins, Detroit Tigers, Arizona Diamondbacks, and Cincinnati Reds; 2003 NL Rookie of the Year; 2003 World Series champion
- John Wimberley — American photographer and artist
