= James Hampton =

James Hampton may refer to:

- James Hampton (priest) (1721–1778), English cleric known as the translator of the Ancient Greek historian Polybius
- James G. Hampton (1814–1861), member of the U.S. House of Representatives from New Jersey's 1st district
- James Hampton (artist) (1909–1964), American outsider artist
- James Hampton (actor) (1936–2021), American television and film actor
- James Hampton (professor) (born 1951), British cognitive psychologist
