= Karen Hampton (textile designer) =

American fiber artist

Karen S. Hampton is an American textile designer, textile artist, and quilter. She creates works of art intended to hang on a wall, and "wearable art" including scarves and jackets. She lives in Evansville, Indiana.

== Biography ==
Hampton develops her own fabrics using various surface design techniques that include batik (stamping with copper tjap stamps), rozome, silk-screening, breakdown screen printing, discharging and over dyeing, and felting. She also produces fabric using a "snow" dying technique and produces digital/quilted art pieces. In addition to quilting Hampton uses a variety of sewing techniques to produce wall hangings, such as Korean pojagi patchwork.

Hampton is an Indiana Artisan, an honorary title granted by juried artists and crafters representing the state. She is also a member of the Studio Art Quilt Associates, Surface Design Association, and the International Quilt Association.
