= John Lamping =

American politician (born 1962)

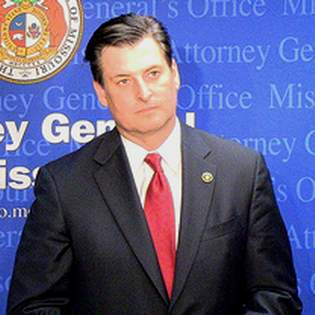
- Lamping in 2012

Member of the Missouri Senate from the 24th district
- In office 2011–2015
- Preceded by: Joan Bray
- Succeeded by: Jill Schupp

Personal details
- Born: October 19, 1962 (age 63) St. Louis, Missouri, U.S.
- Party: Republican
- Spouse: Caryn
- Children: 6
- Education: Princeton University; New York University (MBA)
- Profession: Securities broker

John T. Lamping (born October 19, 1962) is an American politician and securities broker from the state of Missouri. A Republican, he served in the Missouri Senate, representing the 24th district from 2011 to 2015.

== Early and personal life ==
John Lamping was born and raised in southern St. Louis County, Missouri. Following graduation from St. Louis University High School, he attended Princeton University, where he earned a degree in Economics in 1985. Lamping worked as a currency trader in New York City and later earned his MBA from NYU. When not involved with his duties in the General Assembly, he works for a St. Louis securities brokerage firm.

He and his wife Caryn (whom he met while in New York City) are the parents of six children.

== Political history ==
In 2010, Lamping defeated Democrat Barbara Fraser in a close general election for a four-year term, to replace the term-limited Joan Bray. The initial vote tally showed a difference of only 133 votes between Lamping, the leader, and Fraser. Fraser requested a recount from the Missouri Secretary of State's office, and on December 22, 2010, the recount officially certified Lamping as the winner by 126 votes.

Lamping did not run for re-election to a second term in the Senate in 2014.

Missouri 24th District State Senate Election 2010
Party	Candidate	Votes	%	±%
Republican	John Lamping	30,619	50.1%	Winner
Democratic	Barbara Fraser	30,493	49.9%	

Committee assignments --Lamping served on the following committees during the 96th General Assembly:

- Vice-Chairman, Commerce, Consumer Protection, Energy and the Environment.
- Member, Health, Mental Health, Seniors and Families.
- Member, Jobs, Economic Development and Local Government.
- Member, Transportation.
- Member, Veterans Affairs, Emerging Issues, Pensions & Urban Affairs.

=== Affordable Care Act bill ===
Lamping attracted national attention in 2013 when he introduced a bill that would suspend the state licenses to operate in Missouri of any insurance companies which accepted subsidies offered by the United States government to pay health insurance premiums under the Affordable Care Act. Lamping asserted that (despite National Federation of Independent Business v. Sebelius), the ACA is "illegal" and will eventually be overturned by federal courts.
