= Alameda High School =

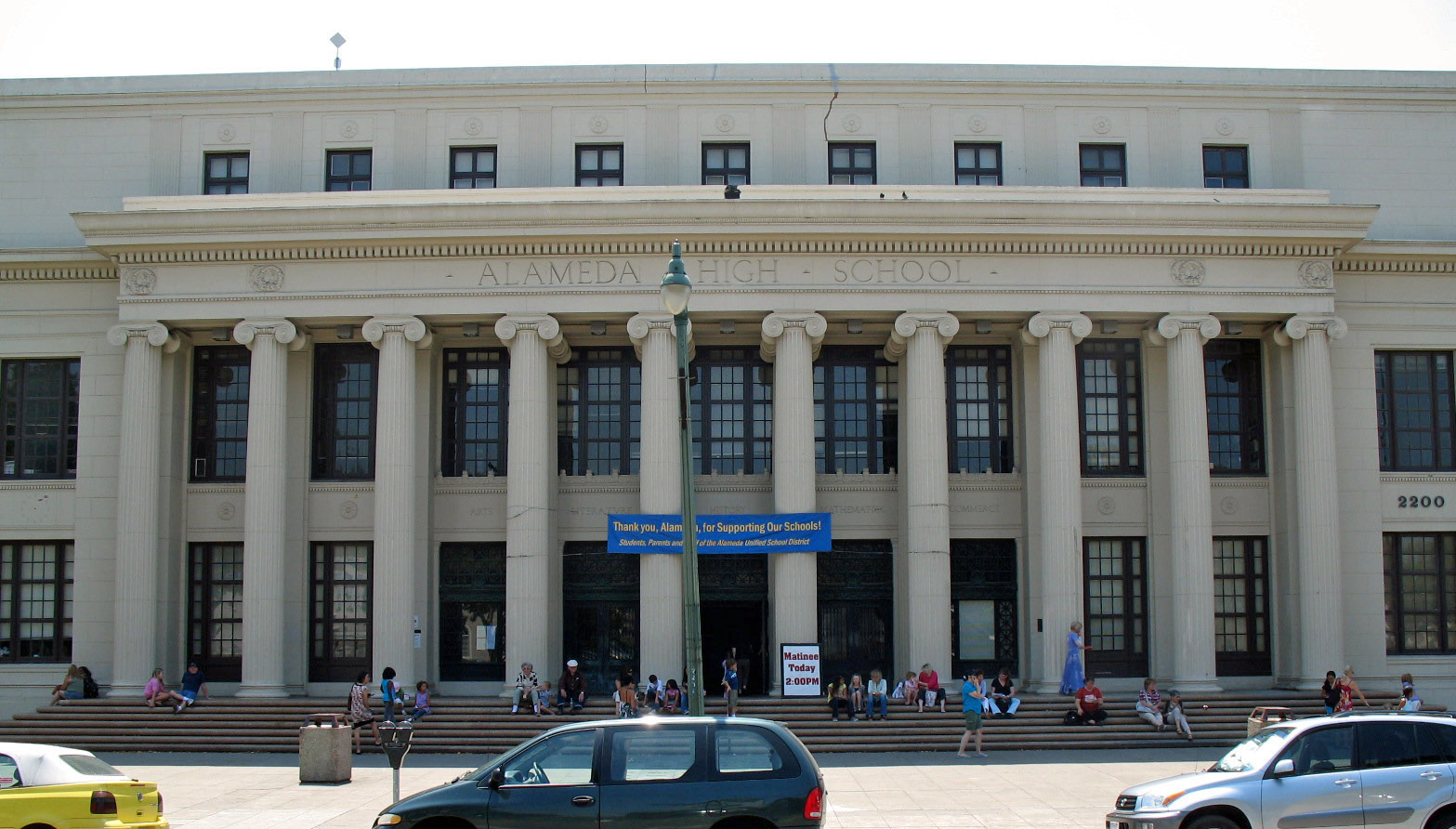
- The school's 1920s auditorium was designed in the Neo-Classical Revival style.

Location
- 2200 Central Ave, Alameda, CA 94501; Alameda, CA 94501; United States

Information
- Type: Public high school
- Motto: Always High Standards
- Established: 1874
- School district: Alameda Unified School District
- Principal: Alexander Harp
- Faculty: Approximately 100
- Teaching staff: 78.22 (FTE)
- Grades: 9-12
- Enrollment: 1,863 (2023–2024)
- Student to teacher ratio: 23.82
- Colors: Gold and white
- Athletics: Football, basketball, cheerleading, track & field, soccer, softball, volleyball, tennis, baseball, swimming & diving, golf, cross country, badminton, and water polo
- Athletics conference: CIF North Coast Section – WACC
- Mascot: Hornets
- Website: School website
- Alameda High School
- U.S. National Register of Historic Places
- Location within Oakland, California Location within California Location within the United States
- Location: 2200 Central Ave., Alameda, California
- Coordinates: 37°45′52.614″N 122°14′47.302″W
- Built: 1928
- Architects: Carl Werner; builder: Kump, Ernest J.
- Architectural style: Classical Revival
- NRHP reference No.: 77000280
- Added to NRHP: May 12, 1977

Alameda High School is a co-educational state high school serving grades 9–12. It is located in Alameda, California, United States, and is part of the Alameda Unified School District.

== History ==
The suggestion to open a "Preparatory Department of a High School" was first presented at an Alameda Board of Education meeting held on March 6, 1874. On April 17, 1874, C. Y. Johns was elected as the first principal. Classes began with 52 students, in July 1874, in a rented room over a drugstore on Park Street known as "Boehmer's Hall". The building still exists today as the China House restaurant.

Boehmer's Hall was only temporary. A new building was already being built on a site on Santa Clara at Chestnut, and was completed and occupied in 1875. The high school shared space with the Grammar Department in what became known as Haight School. The site is still occupied by this school today. The class of 1878, totalling nine students, was the first to graduate from Alameda High School.

It was not long before the number of students enrolled in the high school outgrew the space available at Haight. Temporary quarters were located at the Porter school, located on Alameda Avenue, by 1900. A campaign was started for a new separate high school building.

With the help of the high school student body, a bond was passed in the city for the new school. The cornerstone was laid in 1902 on the new site at Central and Walnut. The building was dedicated in 1903 and occupied in time for the December 1903 term.

Continued growth in enrollment required an even larger campus. In 1925 a new bond issue was voted on. The new school, dedicated in 1926, comprised three connected buildings, including the original 1903 structure which was refurbished to blend with the architectural style of the other two. The architecture, designed by local architect Carl Werner, is early twentieth-century Neo-Classical Revival in nature, evoking images of ancient Greek temples with Ionic columns in front of the Kofman Auditorium, a facility known throughout the Bay Area as one of the best of the local playhouses.

By 1955, the "old building" had outlived its usefulness and was replaced with what became known as the "new building" by subsequent students until 1977.

Campaigns to replace old public buildings with newer earthquake-safe structures led to the construction of the newest high school building, across the street from the established campus, on Encinal at Walnut.

Original plans involved tearing down the 1926 buildings and replacing them with a sports complex, and only keeping the "new building" of 1955. A dedicated group of alumni and citizens saved the venerable buildings, and the planned new construction was scaled back to what exists today.

The newest building was first occupied in 1978 and included the site of the former Porter school. The west wing now houses Language and Fine Arts, as well as the Frederick L. Chacon Little Theater. The school was made an Alameda Historical Monument in 1976 and was listed in the National Register of Historic Places in 1977.

== Enrollment and academics ==
Alameda High School is an ethnically diverse school and in 2018 has a composition that is 41% Asian, 30% White, 13% Hispanic, 6% Black, and 4% two or more races.

Alameda High School has a good academic performance in general, and Alameda High School is ranked #109 in California. In 2017, 95% of the students graduated.

== Other student activities ==
=== Athletics ===
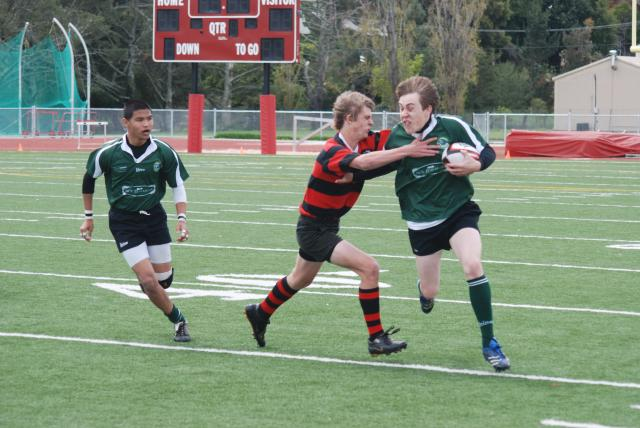
Alameda Islanders Rugby playing Marin Highlanders

AHS is part of the West Alameda County Conference (WACC) of the North Coast Section (NCS) of the California Interscholastic Federation (CIF).

Encinal High, Alameda High, and St. Joseph Notre Dame High School collectively field men's and women's rugby union teams.

== Notable alumni ==
- Dick Bartell, professional baseball player (New York Giants, Pittsburgh Pirates, Philadelphia Phillies, Chicago Cubs, Detroit Tigers)
- Andy Carey, professional baseball player, 2-time World Series champion (New York Yankees, Kansas City Athletics, Chicago White Sox, Los Angeles Dodgers)
- Danny Chauncey, guitarist for .38 Special
- Keelan Doss, professional football player for the Atlanta Falcons
- Debbi Fields, creator of Mrs. Fields bakery
- Ray French, Professional baseball player (New York Yankees, Brooklyn Robins, Chicago White Sox)
- Mary Gennoy, medical marijuana activist in San Francisco
- Harold Gonsalves, Medal of Honor recipient
- William F. Knowland, 1925 Senior class president and U.S. Senate Majority Leader
- Kreayshawn (attended 2004–2006, did not graduate), rapper, best known for her hit single "Gucci Gucci"
- Duffy Lewis, Professional baseball player (Boston Red Sox, New York Yankees, Washington Senators)
- Dutch Lieber, Professional baseball player (Philadelphia Athletics)
- Bill Macdonald, Professional baseball player (Pittsburgh Pirates)
- Jim Morrison (attended starting 1958, did not graduate), songwriter, lead singer for The Doors
- Lou Nova, boxer
- Maureen Orth (class of 1960) Journalist, author, and a Special Correspondent for Vanity Fair magazine. She is the widow of TV journalist Tim Russert, and mother of TV journalist and author Luke Russert.
- Simon Rex, actor
- Mikhaila Rutherford (class of 2006), paralympic swimmer
- Erik Schullstrom, Professional baseball player (Minnesota Twins)
- Bill Serena, Professional baseball player (Chicago Cubs)
- Chris Speier, Professional baseball player (San Francisco Giants, Montreal Expos, St. Louis Cardinals, Minnesota Twins, Chicago Cubs)
- Stephen Stucker actor
- Taylor Takahashi, actor and chef
- Leo Thomas, Professional baseball player (St. Louis Browns, Chicago White Sox)
- Johnny Vergez, Professional baseball player (New York Giants, Philadelphia Phillies, St. Louis Cardinals)
- Bob Veselic, Professional baseball player (Minnesota Twins)
- Bryan Woo, Professional baseball player (Seattle Mariners)

== Notable faculty ==
- Don Perata, politician (former faculty)
