= Henry Hamilton McCreary =

American politician

Henry Hamilton McCreary (December 28, 1861 – October 12, 1921) was an American newspaper editor, publisher, and Democratic Party politician in Florida. He served 20 years in the Florida legislature, first in the Florida House of Representatives and then in the Florida Senate.

Henry Hamilton McCreary was born in Southport, North Carolina, on December 28, 1861 the son of William T. McCreary, a carpenter, and Mary née Hamilton. His cousin was James B. McCreary, a United States senator and governor of Kentucky.

In 1866 the McCreary family moved to Florida, first settling in Fernandina, and then two years later moving to Cedar Key. McCreary received his education in several Florida public schools and graduated with a degree in commerce from the University of Kentucky. He married Irene Imajon Richardson (1865-1937) on November 28, 1883 and they had three children, Margaret (b. 1884), Irene (b.1887) and Elmer Frazier (b.1890).

McCreary was the editor/publisher of the Daily Sun, a daily newspaper based in Gainesville, which was formed through the merger in 1890 of the Gainesville Advocate and the Daily Morning Record. In 1903 the Daily Sun became the Gainesville Daily Sun, which briefly ran under the masthead of the Gainesville Sun. He also had real estate investment. He also published The Alachua Advocate from 1881 until 1889.

In 1892 he was elected as a member of the Gainesville City Council, and served as chairman of the City's Finance Committee. In 1894 McCreay was elected to the Florida House of Representatives and was re-elected in 1896. In 1898 he was elected as a state senator from the 32nd District and was re-elected in 1902 and again in 1906 and 1910. He had a political rivalry with William N. Sheats.

His wife served four terms as president of the Kirby Smith Chapter (Kirby Smith) of the United Daughters of the Confederacy (U.D.C.)

He died of pneumonia, on October 12, 1921 in Gainesville, Florida.
