= Michael Hampton (disambiguation) =

Michael Hampton (born 1956) is an American funk/rock guitarist.

Michael Hampton may also refer to:

- Michael Hampton (punk musician), hardcore punk guitarist from Washington, D.C.
- Michael Hampton, better known under his stage name DJ Magic Mike
- Mike Hampton (Michael William Hampton, born 1972), American baseball player
- Mike Hampton (baseball coach) (Michael Anthony Hampton, born 1972), American college baseball coach
