= John Hampton (footballer) =

English footballer (1901–1939)

Personal information
- Full name: John William Hampton
- Date of birth: 6 March 1901
- Place of birth: Wolverhampton, England
- Date of death: 1939 (aged 37–38)
- Position: Goalkeeper

Senior career*
Years	Team	Apps	(Gls)
1918–1919	Wellington Town		
1919–1922	Oakengates Town		
1922–1927	Wolverhampton Wanderers	49	(0)
1927–1930	Derby County	12	(0)
1930–1931	Preston North End	37	(0)
1931–1934	Dundalk		
1934	Wellington Town		
Total		98	(0)
- * Club domestic league appearances and goals

John William Hampton (6 March 1901 – 1939) was an English footballer who played in the Football League for Derby County, Preston North End and Wolverhampton Wanderers.
