= Jill Schupp =

American politician

Member of the Missouri Senate from the 24th district
- In office January 7, 2015 – January 4, 2023
- Preceded by: John Lamping
- Succeeded by: Tracy McCreery

Member of the Missouri House of Representatives from the 88th district
- In office January 7, 2009 – January 7, 2015
- Succeeded by: Tracy McCreery

Personal details
- Born: January 27, 1955 (age 71)
- Party: Democratic
- Spouse: Mark Schupp
- Children: 2
- Education: University of Missouri (BA); UMSL (GrCert)

Jill Schupp (née Seltzer; born January 27, 1955) is an American politician and a former Democratic member of the Missouri Senate, representing the 24th district consisting of the western suburbs of St. Louis from 2015 to 2023. Previously, Schupp represented the 88th district in the Missouri House of Representatives.

On December 3, 2019, she announced she would run for Missouri's 2nd congressional district in 2020. Schupp won the primary and was defeated by incumbent Republican Ann Wagner in the general election.

== Early life and education ==
Schupp graduated from Parkway North High School in Creve Coeur, Missouri and the University of Missouri in Columbia. She did subsequent graduate work at University of Missouri at St. Louis, where she received a teachers certificate. After a brief stint as a teacher she worked as a small business executive for her husband's advertisement agency.

== Political career ==
Schupp's political career began in 2000 as a member of the Ladue School Board, where she served for six years including two terms as President. In 2007, she was elected to the Creve Coeur City Council.

=== Missouri House of Representatives ===
Schupp was an elected member of the Missouri House of Representatives from 2008 to 2014, where she served on the Joint Committee on Life Sciences, Budget Committee, Health Insurance Committee, Higher Education Committee, and the Children, Families, and Persons with Disabilities Committee.

=== Missouri Senate ===
In 2014, Schupp was elected to the Missouri Senate. After running unopposed in the Democratic primary, she defeated Republican Jay Ashcroft and Libertarian Jim Higgins with 50% of the vote against 47% and 3% respectively. After raising over $1 million for her reelection bid, she was re-elected to the senate 2018, defeating Republican Gregory Powers. Schupp represents the 24th Senate district, which is located in St. Louis County.

=== 2020 U.S. House election ===
On December 3, 2019, Schupp officially announced her campaign for the Democratic nomination to the U.S. House of Representatives against Republican incumbent Ann Wagner for Missouri's 2nd congressional district. Her state senate district covers much of the St. Louis County portion of the congressional district. She did not have to give up her state senate seat to run for Congress; her term in the state senate wasn't due to expire until 2023 (at which time she will be termed out of the chamber).

She won the Democratic primary unopposed, but she lost to Wagner by 6.4 percentage points.

== Electoral history ==
=== State representative ===
Missouri House of Representatives Election, November 4, 2008, District 82
Party	Candidate	Votes	%	±%
Democratic	Jill Schupp	11,475	59.70%	−4.58
Republican	Frank Plescia	7,745	40.30%	+4.58
Total votes		19,220	100	

Missouri House of Representatives Election, November 2, 2010, District 82
Party	Candidate	Votes	%	±%
Democratic	Jill Schupp	9,947	100.00%	+40.30
Total votes		9,947	100	

Missouri House of Representatives Election, November 6, 2012, District 88
Party	Candidate	Votes	%	±%
Democratic	Jill Schupp	15,334	100.00%	0
Total votes		15,334	100	

=== State Senate ===
Missouri Senate Election, November 4, 2014, District 24
Party	Candidate	Votes	%	±%
Democratic	Jill Schupp	28,022	50.09%	+0.19
Republican	John R. "Jay" Ashcroft	26,196	46.82%	−3.28
Libertarian	Jim Higgins	1,727	3.09%	+3.09
Total votes		55,945	100	

Missouri Senate Election, November 6, 2018, District 24
Party	Candidate	Votes	%	±%
Democratic	Jill Schupp	51,106	60.86%	+10.77
Republican	Gregory B. Powers	31,153	37.10%	−9.72
Libertarian	Jim Higgins	1,708	2.03%	−1.06
Total votes		83,967	100	

=== United States House of Representatives ===
United States House of Representatives Election, November 3, 2020, Missouri's 2nd Congressional District
Party	Candidate	Votes	%	±%
Republican	Ann Wagner	233,157	51.89%	+0.71
Democratic	Jill Schupp	204,540	45.52%	−1.71
Libertarian	Martin Schulte	11,647	2.59%	+1.47
Write-In	Gina Bufe	4	0.00%	N/A
Total votes		449,348	100	

Missouri Senate
Preceded by John Lamping	Member of the Missouri Senate from the 24th district 2015–present	Succeeded by Tracy McCreery
