= William M. Hampton =

American physician

Dr. William M. Hampton (died 1960) was an American physician and politician from North Carolina. In 1951, Hampton became the first African-American elected to the Greensboro, North Carolina City Council. He was re-elected in 1953.

Hampton was born in New Jersey and moved to Warnersville neighborhood of Greensboro in 1939. He attended Meharry Medical College in Nashville, Tennessee. Because Hampton was elected to a formerly all-White City Council in a Jim Crow state, his election was a national news story and was covered by Time magazine and the New York Times.
