= Barry Hampton =

New Zealand cricketer

Personal information
- Full name: Barry Leon Hampton
- Born: 16 January 1941 (age 85); Westport, New Zealand
- Batting: Right-handed
- Bowling: Right-arm medium

Domestic team information
- Years: Team
- 1961/62–1968/69: Central Districts

Career statistics
Competition	First-class
Matches	35
Runs scored	1,163
Batting average	27.04
100s/50s	1/4
Top score	107
Balls bowled	5,812
Wickets	74
Bowling average	24.90
5 wickets in innings	3
10 wickets in match	0
Best bowling	6/7
Catches/stumpings	24/–
- Source: Cricinfo, 2 November 2017

Barry Leon Hampton (born 16 January 1941) is a former New Zealand cricketer who played first-class cricket for Central Districts from 1961 to 1968.

A middle-order batsman and economical medium-pace bowler, Hampton made his highest score, 107, for Central Districts against Canterbury in 1967–68, when he and Bryan Yuile added 219 for the seventh wicket. His best bowling figures were 6 for 7 (match figures of 33–23–19–8), when Central Districts dismissed Otago for 82 in 1963–64.

Hampton played Hawke Cup cricket for Nelson from 1960 to 1975, and was named in the Hawke Cup Team of the Century in 2011. In 1963–64, when Nelson were defending their title, he scored 236 against Waikato. Nelson's total of 632 was a Hawke Cup record at the time.
