= William Wade Hampton =

American lawyer

William Wade Hampton (22 January 1856–1928) was one of the first attorneys in Gainesville, Florida.

Hampton was born near Albany, Georgia. His family was descended from Anthony Hampton, one of the first white settlers in Virginia; his father, Thomas Franklin Hampton, was a clerk in Decatur County, Georgia. He went to private schools in Bainbridge, Georgia and was admitted to the Georgia bar association in 1876.

He and his brother Edwin moved to Gainesville from Tampa, Florida in 1876. Wade and his brother Edwin founded the town's first paper, the Gainesville Times in 1876, the first Democratic paper county since the American Civil War. This paper later became The Gainesville Sun.

Wade and his brother Edwin founded the town's first law firm, Hampton and Hampton and he was the first president of the Florida Bar. Wade was the first of three generations of Wade Hamptons who practiced law in Gainesville from 1875 until 2006.

Wade Hampton was a leader in the efforts to bring the University of Florida to Gainesville in 1906.

Wade and his wife Minna Jordan Hampton lived in a house in the Northeast Historic district of Gainesville, but it was torn down in the 1970s. The home of one of his sons, William Wade Hampton Jr., is one of the oldest in the Gainesville Northeast Historic District. Hampton Sr. was the first president of the Florida Bar Association. One of his grandsons, William Wade Hampton III, served as City Judge in Gainesville and later as a Federal Judge.
