= Karen Hampton (weaver) =

American textile artist

- Born: 1958 (age 67–68); Los Angeles, California, U.S.
- Education: Laney College, New College of California (BA), University of California, Davis (MFA)
- Occupation: Textile artist
- Website: https://www.kdhampton.com/

Karen Hampton (born 1958) is an American textile artist, working as a weaver, surface designer, and fabric dyer. She has also worked as a researcher on the history of textile production. As of 2022, she was named a Fellow of the American Craft Council. Hampton lives in Los Angeles.

== Education ==
Starting at the age of eight, Hampton learned and practiced sewing and embroidery at home. After high school, she attended Laney College for one year. She would later earn a BA degree in art and anthropology from the New College of California in San Francisco. Hampton continued her education as an artist while apprenticing to master weaver and dyer Ida Grae, and later completed her MFA degree at University of California, Davis (U.C. Davis).

== Work ==
Hampton works in a combination of textile media, most prominently weaving, dyeing, embroidery, and surface design, as well as printing using archival images. Her pieces often reference American and African American history, as a response to her view that "the history of female slaves and early American textile production had been forgotten." Since learning of Flora, an ancestor of Hampton's who had been freed from slavery in the late 1700s and later became a landowner, she has incorporated family history into her art, in addition to her own life experiences including voluntary busing as a child.

In addition to her artwork, Hampton produces scholarly research on the history of textile production by African American women during slavery.

Hampton has shown solo exhibitions at institutions including the Honolulu Museum of Art, the Ruth and Elmer Wellin Museum of Art, and the Museum of Craft and Folk Art in San Francisco.

== Awards ==
- 2022, Fellow of the American Craft Council.
- 2015, Instituto Sacatar Fellowship, Salvador, Bahia, Brazil
- 2011, Purchase Award, Prince George's County Parks & Planning
- 2008, Eureka Fellowship, Fleishhacker Foundation
- 2008, Career Development Grant, Marin Arts Council, Marin County, CA
- 2000, Ellen Hansen Prize, UC Davis, Davis CA
- 1999, Jastro Shield Research Fellowship, UC Davis, Davis CA
