= John Wimberley =

American photographer and artist

- Born: July 1945 (age 80); Paget, Bermuda
- Occupation: Photographer
- Website: http://johnwimberleyphotography.com

John Wimberley (born July 1945) is an American fine art photographer with a focus on landscapes and human figures, as well as mining camps and Native American rock art from the American West. His work is included in the permanent collections of the Portland Art Museum, the Museum of Fine Arts Houston, the Yale University Art Gallery, among others.

== Life and work ==
=== Early years ===
Wimberley was born in Bermuda in 1945 and moved to Alameda, California in 1948, where he lived until he enlisted in the United States Navy in 1963. In the Navy, John was trained and served as an Aviation Electronics Technician. He first began to explore photography using color film on the flight deck of the aircraft carrier during his tours in the Vietnam War. After his discharge from the Navy, Wimberley returned to the San Francisco Bay Area and worked as an electronics technician for Smith-Kline Instruments in Palo Alto, pursuing his photography during lunch hours on nearby.

=== Work ===
Wimberley shoots on large-format negatives, his subject matter focus is American Western landscapes. In the early 1980s, his work departed from landscape to include a series of images of a friend of his in an acquaintance's swimming pool. These photographs, made both under water and looking down from above the surface, form a distinct portfolio.

In 1985 and 1986, Wimberley traveled to New Zealand and Ireland to photograph human habitation, standing stones and ancient rock walls. From the late 1980s, Wimberley began to explore abandoned mining camps and ghost towns, for example in the Owens Valley. In 1999 he transitioned to photographing Native American rock art sites, a subject he has not turned from since. Camping for weeks at time, Wimberley ranged across Eastern Oregon, the Great Basin, and Owens Valley. He continued to make images of the surrounding landscape, but an increasingly prolific body of work focused on the rock art itself. Into the early 2000s he continued he continued to shoot to black and white large format negatives.

=== Critical reception ===
Wimberley's best known photograph is Descending Angel (1981), of a woman underwater. His influences include spirituality, mysticism, mythology, and psychology. Artweek Magazine described his work as "not merely technically correct, but wonderfully alive. The Sacramento Bee described his work as having "clarity of focus, depth of field, and masterful composition", while the Seattle Times states, "a perfect shot meets a perfect lensman." His work has also been reviewed in the BainBridge Island Review, the Mail Tribune, and The Mercury News.

== Publications by the artist ==
- Evidence of Magic: Photographs 1999-2008: Petroglyphs of the Great Basin
- A Metaphysic of Light: Photographs 1970-1988
- Dreaming at the Edge: Photographs 1989-2013
- Gestures to the Spirit: Photography and Beyond (extended interview conducted by writer Stephen Quinn)
- My Home is a Place of Light (photographs by John Wimberley; poems by Stephen Quinn)

=== Video ===
John Wimberley, American Master: A Metaphysic of Light. A Robert L Burrill Film (60 min.)

== Collections ==
Wimberley's work is included in numerous permanent museum collections including the Portland Art Museum, the Museum of Fine Arts Houston, the Yale University Art Gallery.

== Sources ==
The Oliver Rock Art Photography Award
