= Joan Bray =

American politician (born 1945)

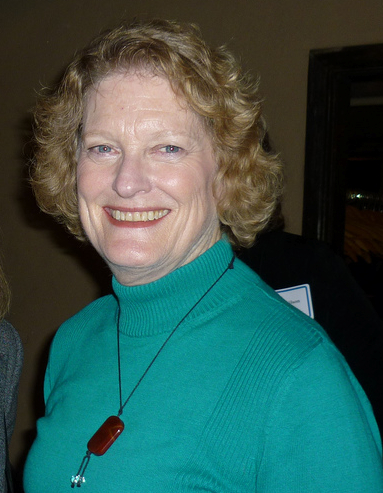
- Bray in 2010.

Member of the Missouri Senate from the 24th district
- In office 2003 - 2010
- Succeeded by: John Lamping

Member of the Missouri House of Representatives from the 84th district
- In office 1993 - 2002
- Succeeded by: Allen Icet

Personal details
- Born: September 16, 1945 (age 80) Lubbock, Texas
- Party: Democratic
- Spouse: Carl Hoagland
- Education: Southwestern University, University of Massachusetts Amherst
- Profession: teacher, journalist

Joan Bray (born September 16, 1945) is a former teacher, journalist, and union leader. She was a Democratic member of both the Missouri House of Representatives (1993–2002) and Missouri State Senate (2003–2010). She resides with her husband, Carl Hoagland, in St. Louis, Missouri. She has two children, Noel and Kolby.

Bray was born in Lubbock, Texas, and graduated from Southwestern University with a B.A. in English, and from the University of Massachusetts Amherst with a C.A.G.S. She was a teacher in Colorado and Massachusetts. She has also was a journalist with the San Antonio Express-News and St. Louis Post-Dispatch, during which time she served as vice-president of the Newspaper Guild's Local 49.

Bray was first elected to the Missouri House of Representatives in 1992, and served in that body through 2002, when she was elected to the Missouri State Senate. She was term-limited out in 2010, when she was replaced by Republican John Lamping.

In the Senate, she served on the following committees:

- Appropriations
- Commerce, Consumer Protection, Energy and the Environment
- Rules, Joint Rules, Resolutions and Ethics
- Transportation
- Ways and Means
- Joint Committee on MO Health Net
- Joint Committee on Transportation Oversight
- Joint Committee on Tax Policy

Bray was appointed interim executive director of Consumers Council of Missouri in March 2013.
