= Hampton =

Hampton may refer to:

== Places ==
=== Australia ===
- Hampton bioregion, an IBRA biogeographic region in Western Australia
- Hampton, New South Wales
- Hampton, Queensland, a town in the Toowoomba Region
- Hampton, Victoria
  - Hampton railway station, Melbourne
- Hampton Tableland, Western Australia

=== Canada ===
- Hampton, New Brunswick
- Hampton Parish, New Brunswick
- Hampton, Nova Scotia
- Hampton, Ontario
- Hampton, Prince Edward Island

=== Finland ===
- Hämpton, a nickname of Hämeenlinna

=== United Kingdom ===
- Hampton, Cheshire, former civil parish
- Hampton, Herne Bay, Kent
  - Hampton-on-Sea, Herne Bay, Kent (drowned settlement at the above location)
- Hampton, London, London Borough of Richmond upon Thames
  - Hampton (ward), Richmond upon Thames
  - Hampton Court Palace, Richmond upon Thames
  - Hampton Hill, Richmond upon Thames
  - Hampton Wick, Richmond upon Thames
  - Hampton Wick (ward), Richmond upon Thames
- Hampton, Peterborough in Cambridgeshire
- Hampton Gay, Oxfordshire
- Hampton Poyle, Oxfordshire
- Hampton Loade, Shropshire
- Hampton Lucy, Warwickshire
- Hampton, Worcestershire
- Hampton in Arden in Solihull, West Midlands
- Hampton-on-the-Hill, Warwickshire

=== United States ===
Listed alphabetically by state name

- Hampton, Arkansas, town in Calhoun County
- Hampton, Connecticut, a town in Windham County
- Hampton, Florida, a city in Bradford County
- Hampton, Georgia, a city in Henry County
- Hampton, Illinois, a village in Rock Island County
- Hampton, Iowa, a town and county seat of Franklin County
- Hampton, Kansas, a ghost town in Rush Count
- Hampton, Kentucky, an unincorporated community in Livingston County
- Hampton, Maryland, an unincorporated community in Baltimore County
- Hampton, Minnesota, a city in Dakota County
- Hampton, Missouri, a former hamlet in Platte County; annexed by Kansas City in 1966
- Hampton, Nebraska, a village in Hamilton County
- Hampton, New Hampshire, a town in Rockingham County
- Hampton, New Jersey, a borough in Hunterdon County
- Hampton, New York, a town in Washington County
- Hampton, Oregon, an unincorporated community in Deschutes County
- Hampton, Pennsylvania, an unincorporated community in Reading Township, Adams County
- Hampton, South Carolina, a town in Hampton Count
- Hampton, Tennessee, an unincorporated community in Carter County
- Hampton, Texas, a town in Palo Pinto County
- Hampton, Virginia, an independent city in the state of Virginia
- Hampton, Utah, an unincorporated community in Box Elder County, now known as Collinston
- Hampton, West Virginia, an unincorporated community in Upshur County

==== See also ====
- The Hamptons, the towns of Southampton and East Hampton on Long Island in the state of New York
- Hampton Roads, a body of water and metropolitan area in Virginia
- Hampton Township (disambiguation), several communities

== People ==
- Hampton (surname), includes a list of notable people with this last name
- Hampton (given name), includes a list of notable people with this first name
- James Hampton Anderson, American computer scientist

== Schools ==
- Hampton Academy (disambiguation), several institutions
- Hampton College (disambiguation), several institutions
- Hampton High School (disambiguation), various institutions
- Hampton School (disambiguation), several institutions
- Hampton University, in the U.S. state of Virginia

== Transportation ==
- Hampton (car), a British automobile produced from 1912 to 1933
- Hampton Ferry (disambiguation), several river ferries
- Hampton station (disambiguation), various rail stations

== Other uses ==
- USS Hampton, various United States Navy ships
- Hampton (horse), a British Thoroughbred racehorse
- Hampton by Hilton, an American hotel chain formerly known as Hampton Inn
- Hampton National Historic Site, located in Towson, Maryland, U.S.
- Hampton One-Design, a class of sailing dinghy
- Battle of Hampton Roads, 1862 battle of the American Civil War

== See also ==
- The Hamptons (disambiguation)
- Hampton Court (disambiguation)
- Hampden (disambiguation)
