= Hampton School (disambiguation) =

Hampton School is a boys-only private day school in Hampton, London, England.

Hampton School may also refer to:

- Hampton School (Jamaica), an all-girls boarding school located in Malvern, Jamaica
- Hampton School District (disambiguation), several school districts in the United States
- Hampton Colored School, listed on the U.S. National Register of Historic Places in South Carolina

== See also ==
- Hampton (disambiguation)#Schools
