= Thames Ditton railway station =

National Rail station in Surrey, England

Thames Ditton
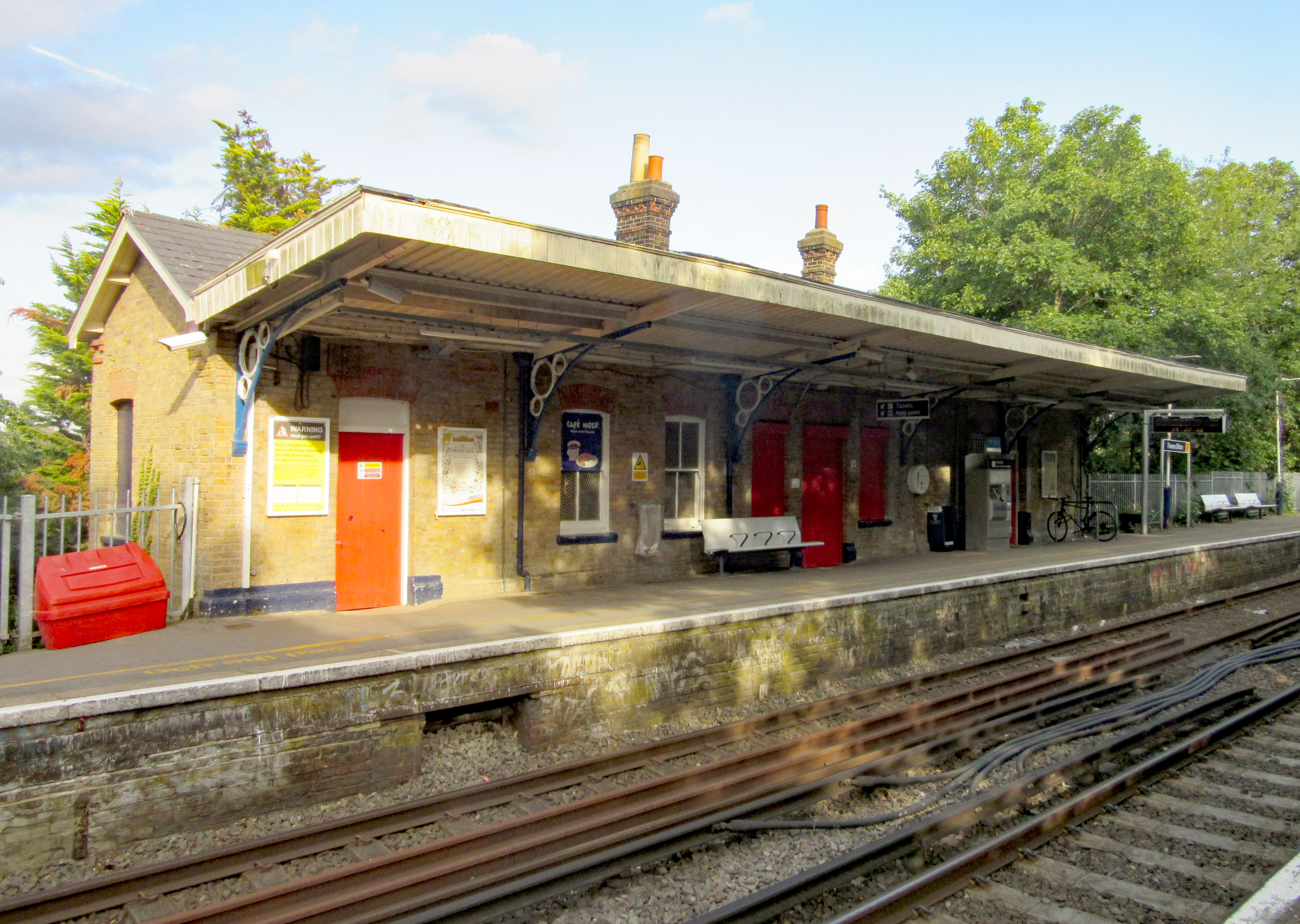
- Interactive map of Thames Ditton

General information
- Location: Thames Ditton
- Local authority: Elmbridge
- Managed by: South Western Railway
- Station code: THD
- DfT category: D
- Number of platforms: 2
- Fare zone: 6

National Rail annual entry and exit
- 2020–21: ▼0.167 million
- 2021–22: ▲0.498 million
- 2022–23: ▲0.617 million
- 2023–24: ▲0.711 million
- 2024–25: ▲0.761 million

Key dates
- 1851: Opened

Other information
- External links: Departures; Facilities
- Coordinates: 51°23′19″N 0°20′18″W

Thames Ditton railway station serves Thames Ditton in the Elmbridge district of Surrey, England. It is the only intermediate station on the Hampton Court branch line, 14 miles 1 chain (22.6 km) down the line from London Waterloo.

It is served by South Western Railway, and for the purposes of fare charging is in London fare zone 6.

Station buildings are above street level: the main buildings are on the London-bound side.

== Services ==
All services at Thames Ditton are operated by South Western Railway.

The typical service on all days of the week is two trains per hour in each direction between London Waterloo and Hampton Court.

Preceding station	National Rail	Following station
Surbiton	South Western Railway Hampton Court Branch Line	Hampton Court

== Facilities ==
As Thames Ditton is an intermediate station, facilities at the station are relatively limited. There is a single-window ticket office within the station building, as well as a single ticket machine on the 'up' platform. Two Transport for London / Oyster contactless touchpoints are provided at entry / exit of each platform.

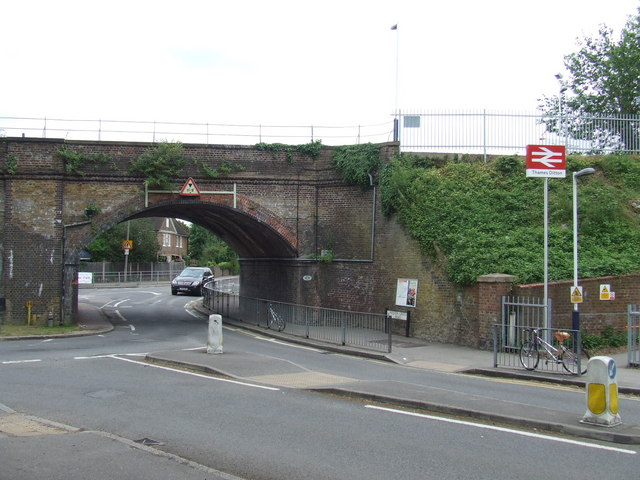
Bridge with the entrance near the bicycle to the platform for trains to Hampton Court. The entrance for trains towards Waterloo is on the other side of the bridge.

Each platform has independent access from the street level below on either side of the bridge that the railway line runs over, requiring exit from the station to cross to the opposite platform. Both platforms are accessed via relatively long and steep upwards ramps (1:8 / 12.5% when traveling to London, 1:5 / 20% on other side), so reduced mobility access is feasible but can be challenging. Access is much flatter at the nearby Hampton Court station, which is also the terminus of the branch line so provides extended time for (dis)embarkation.

A small independent coffee kiosk service on the London-bound platform 1 is open only during the morning peak times.

There is no station car park and while some nearby streets have no parking restrictions those closest to the station do, which also reduces access for travellers with reduced mobility. There are a handful of static cycle racks are available. Station toilets are not advertised.

Bus services 513, 514, 515 and on Sundays 715 serve the station.

== Future ==
As part of the proposed Crossrail 2 infrastructure, Hampton Court has been proposed by business group London First as the terminus for a potential service to Cheshunt via Central London, opening in the "early 2030s". It has been suggested that Crossrail 2 will serve Thames Ditton exclusively following this, with an increase from two trains per hour to four.
