= Hampton Court (disambiguation) =

Hampton Court usually refers to Hampton Court Palace, a palace and former royal residence in south west London, England.

Hampton Court may also refer to:

== Places ==
- Hampton Court Castle, a manor house in Herefordshire, England
- Hampton Court, Guyana
- Hampton Court, Suriname
- Hampton Court (St. Thomas), Jamaica

== Relating to the royal palace ==
- The Treaty of Hampton Court (1526)
- The Treaty of Hampton Court (1562)
- The Hampton Court Conference (1604), a religious settlement between James I and the English Puritans
  - The 1604 Book of Common Prayer, sometimes known as the "Hampton Court Book" for its origin at the conference
- Hampton Court Palace Flower Show
- Hampton Court Palace Festival
- Hampton Court railway station, in East Molesey, which serves Hampton Court Palace
- Hampton Court branch line
- Hampton Court Park
- Hampton Court Maze
- Hampton Court Bridge, crosses the Greater London and Surrey boundary
- Hampton Court Beauties
- Royal Tennis Court, Hampton Court
- Hampton Court House
- Hampton Court and Dittons Regatta

== Other uses ==
- Hampton Court (TV series), Australian television series
- HMS Hampton Court (1678), a ship
- HMS Hampton Court (1709), a ship
