= Hampton College =

Hampton College may refer to:

- Hampton College (Durban, South Africa)
- Hampton College, Peterborough, England
- Hampton Junior College, in Ocala, Florida, U.S.

== See also ==
- Hampton (disambiguation)#Schools
