= Hampton station =

Hampton railway station may refer to:

- Hampton railway station (London), England
  - Hampton Court railway station, East Molesey, Surrey
  - Hampton Wick railway station, Greater London
- Hampton-in-Arden railway station, England
- Hampton railway station, Melbourne, Australia
- Hampton station (New Brunswick), Canada
- Hampton station (DART), Dallas

== See also ==
- Hampton Court railway station, London
