= Surbiton railway station =

National Rail station in London, England

Surbiton
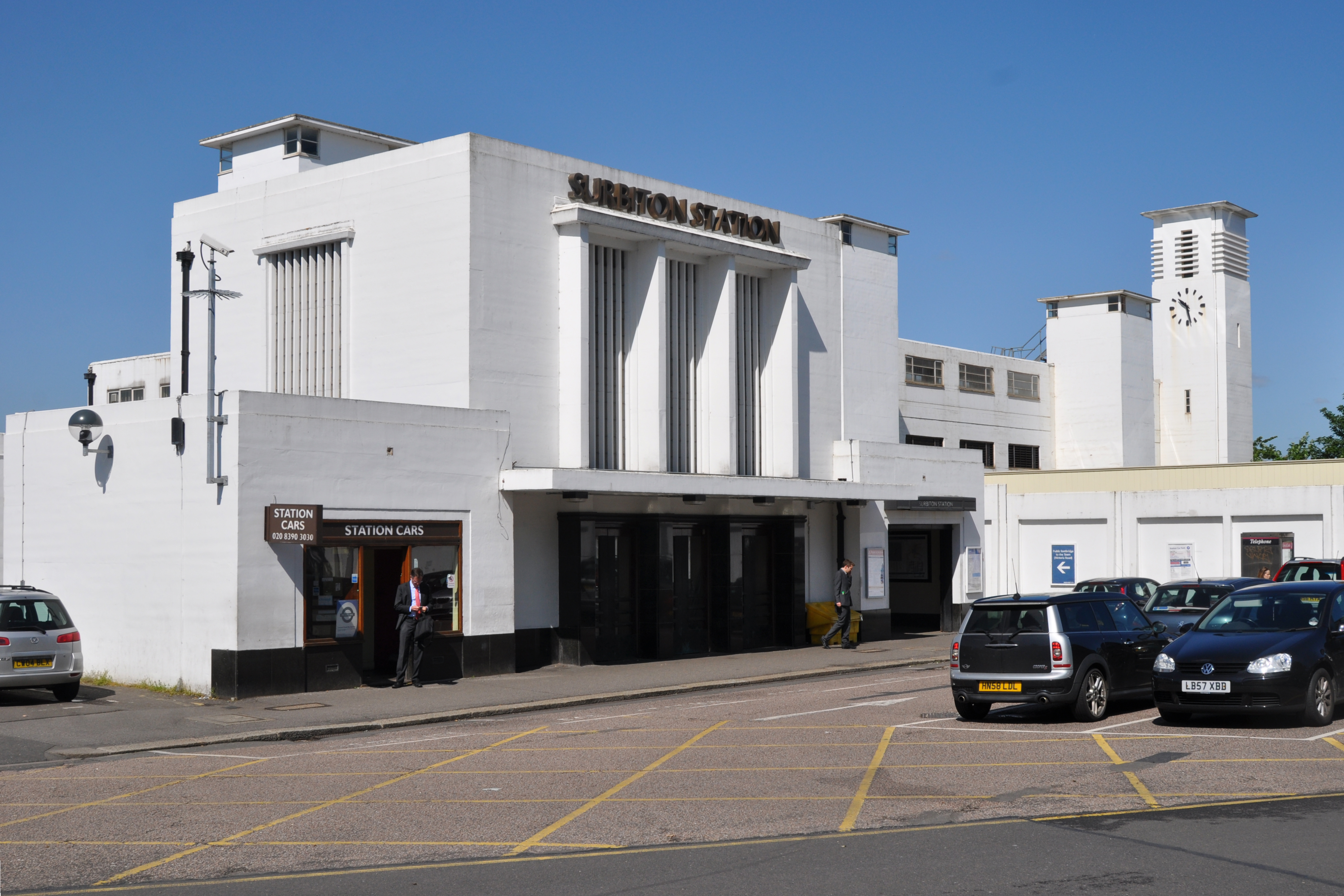
- Surbiton's modernist façade in May 2016 (rear view)
- Interactive map of Surbiton

General information
- Location: Surbiton
- Local authority: Royal Borough of Kingston upon Thames
- Managed by: South Western Railway
- Station code: SUR
- DfT category: B
- Number of platforms: 4
- Tracks: 5
- Accessible: Yes
- Fare zone: 6

National Rail annual entry and exit
- 2020–21: ▼1.945 million
- Interchange: ▼0.125 million
- 2021–22: ▲4.988 million
- Interchange: ▲0.372 million
- 2022–23: ▲6.610 million
- Interchange: ▲0.434 million
- 2023–24: ▲7.335 million
- Interchange: ▲0.537 million
- 2024–25: ▲7.590 million
- Interchange: ▲0.636 million

Key dates
- 21 May 1838: Opened (Kingston)
- 1845: Resited 700 metres (0.43 mi) west
- December 1852: Renamed (Kingston Junction)
- 1 July 1863: Renamed (Surbiton and Kingston)
- 1 October 1867: Renamed (Surbiton)

Listed status
- Listed feature: Surbiton Station
- Listing grade: II
- Entry number: 1185071
- Added to list: 6 October 1983; 43 years ago

Other information
- External links: Departures; Facilities
- Coordinates: 51.3926°N 0.3044°W

Surbiton railway station is a National Rail station in Surbiton, south-west London, in the Royal Borough of Kingston upon Thames. The station is managed and served by South Western Railway, and is in London fare zone 6. It is 12 miles 3 chains (19.4 km) (12.04 miles) from London Waterloo. The front ticket office at Surbiton is open seven days a week.

It has been considered one of the finest modernist stations in Great Britain and is a Grade II listed building.

== History ==
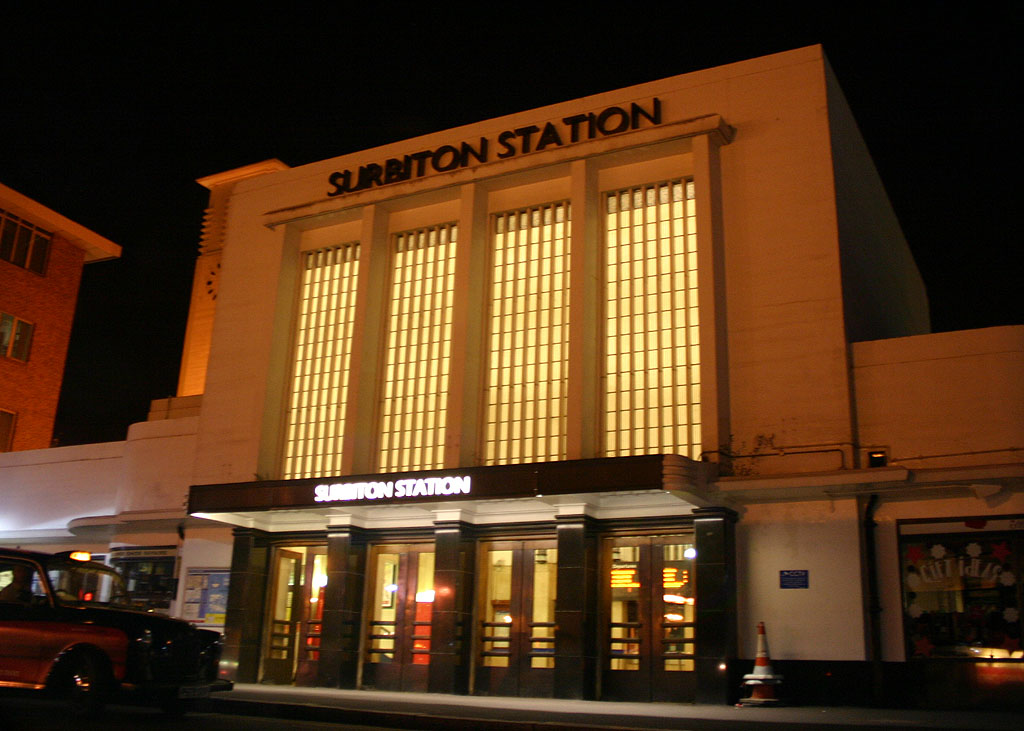
The main (front) entrance at night in August 2005

The London and Southampton Railway intended its line to go via Kingston but Kingston Corporation objected, fearing a harmful impact on their coaching trade, and the railway passed about 1.5 mi (2.4 km) south of the town with the first Kingston station opening in 1838 on the west side of Ewell Road. In either 1840 or in 1845 it was resited 0.5 miles (0.8 km) west to Surbiton, then little more than a farm. The Hampton Court Branch was built in 1849, the New Guildford Line which diverges at the same point opened in 1885.

Successive renamings of the station were Kingston Junction in late 1852, Surbiton and Kingston in 1863 when the present Kingston railway station opened on the branch line, and Surbiton in 1867. The station was completely rebuilt in 1937 by the Southern Railway with two island platforms with Southern Railway designed canopies. The buildings were designed by James Robb Scott in an art deco style. The original hand-drawn large format architectural drawings from the 1937 reconstruction are privately held in a Surbiton collection.

In 1984/85 a large mural titled 'Passengers' was painted in the booking hall by artist Graeme Willson. It has since been removed.

The station had a moderately sized goods yard which was situated on the eastern side of the station platforms. Two additional sidings were located on the western 'up' side of the station and were served by a short loading platform. In addition to local goods facilities, the main yard was also used as the loading point for the short lived Surbiton – Okehampton car carrier service that ran between 1960 and 1964.

The main goods yard finally closed in 1971 with all localised freight operations then being moved to the nearby goods yard at Tolworth on the Chessington branch. The former goods yard site at Surbiton ultimately became the main station car park although some land was also subsequently developed into residential flats. One of the two 'up' sidings remains in place and still sees occasional use with civil engineering stock.

A major incident occurred on 4 July 1971 when a freight train derailed on the points at the London end of platforms 3 & 4. Unaware of the incident, the driver continued through the station with the result that two derailed wagons eventually toppled over south of the platforms and obstructed the down fast through line. At the same time, a down express passed through the station and collided with the derailed wagons at a speed that caused the front of the express to derail and topple over. The leading coach finally came to rest as it struck the road bridge that passes under the line south of the station. There were no fatalities and the cause of the initial derailment was eventually attributed to overloading of some of the ballast wagons in the freight train which resulted in buffer locking when the train initially left Clapham Junction yard that day.

In October 2021, Network Rail commenced work to relieve congestion by adding a new deck and staircase to the footbridge at the London end of Platforms 3 and 4. The work was officially completed on 17 May 2024.

== Services ==
South Western Railway operate services at Surbiton using Class 450 and 701 EMUs, with some early morning and late evening Class 444 services. Until 2022, Class 456 trains were often attached to Class 455 trains to form ten-carriage trains, but these units were withdrawn on 17 January with the introduction of a new timetable. Class 455 trains served Surbiton until 20 March 2026, after which they were withdrawn from service. The station is served by both inner and outer suburban South Western Railway services.

The typical off-peak service in trains per hour (tph) is:

- 4 tph to London Waterloo (fast, one of these run non-stop and three calling at Clapham Junction) with all fast services from Alton/Basingstoke calling at Wimbledon, Clapham Junction, and London Waterloo on Sundays.
- 4 tph to London Waterloo (semi-fast, calling at all stations between Wimbledon and London Waterloo except Queenstown Road)
- 2 tph to London Waterloo (all stations except Queenstown Road)
- 2 tph to Hampton Court
- 2 tph to Woking (all stations, on Sundays these extend to Guildford with alternate services calling at Worplesdon)
- 2 tph to Guildford via Cobham & Stoke d'Abernon
- 2 tph to Basingstoke (semi-fast)
- 2 tph to Alton (semi-fast)

Preceding station	National Rail	Following station
Berrylands	South Western Railway Hampton Court Branch Line	Thames Ditton
Wimbledon	South Western Railway Waterloo to Woking	Esher
Wimbledon	South Western Railway New Guildford Line	Hinchley Wood
Clapham Junction or London Waterloo	South Western Railway Waterloo to Basingstoke	Walton-on-Thames
Clapham Junction or London Waterloo	South Western Railway Alton Line	West Byfleet

== Platforms ==
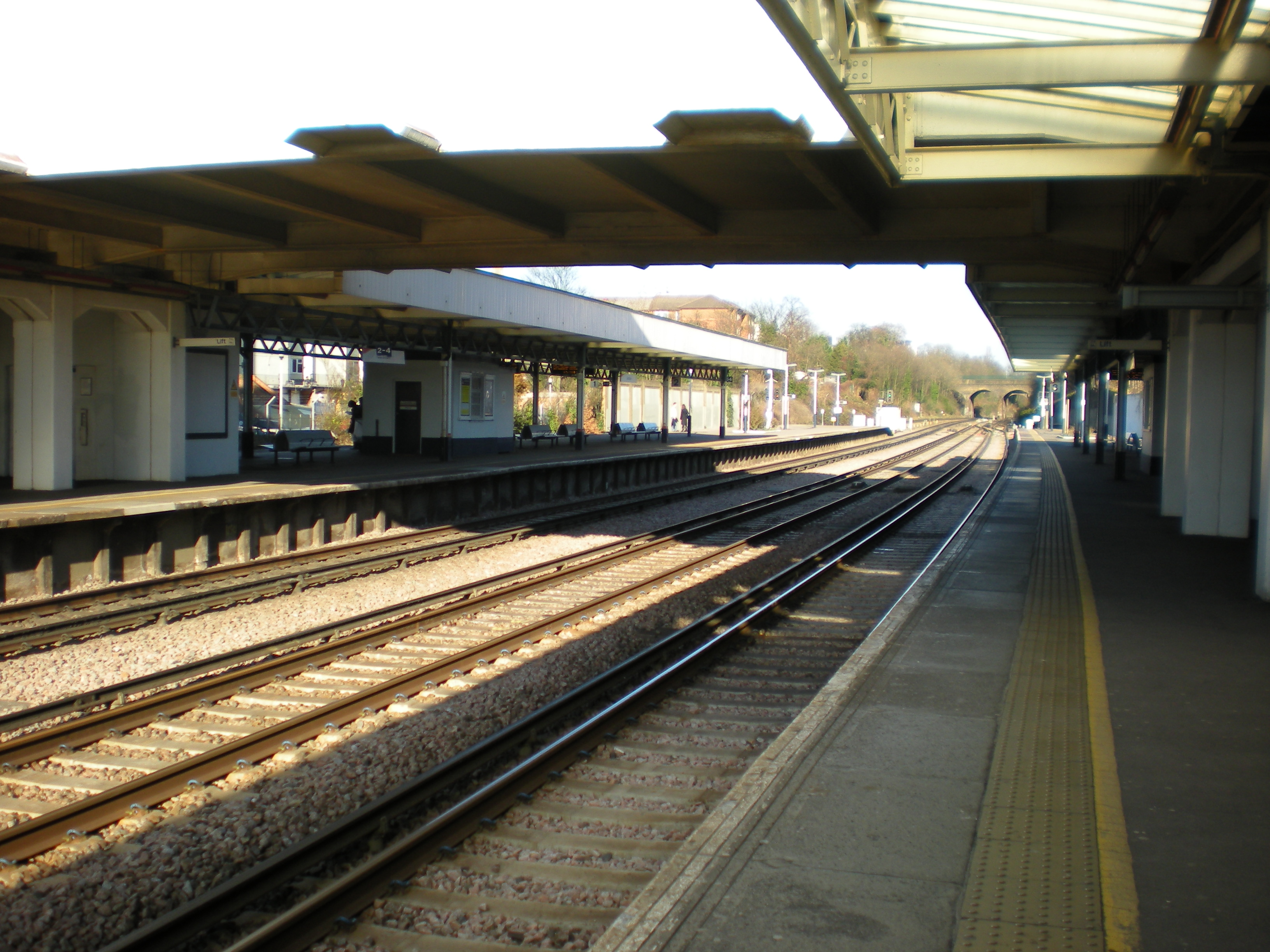
The platforms

The station has four platforms on two islands, all of which can be accessed by 12 carriage trains.

- Platform 1: for most services to London Waterloo.
- Platform 2: for some services to London Waterloo, mostly in the early morning and late evening. Non-stopping up trains use its track.
- An additional track for non-stopping down trains lies between Platforms 2 and 3.
- Platform 3: for trains to Basingstoke and the Alton Line. Trains to Woking, the Hampton Court Branch and the New Guildford Line occasionally use this platform.
- Platform 4: for trains to Woking, the Hampton Court Branch and the New Guildford Line

== Connections ==
London Buses routes 71, 281, 465, K1, K2, K3 and K4 and non-TFL routes 514 and 515 serve the station.

== Appearances in media ==
The station was used for filming of Harry Potter and the Half-Blood Prince in October 2007. Filming began in the early hours to avoid disruption.

Surbiton station also appears in Agatha Christie's Poirot: "The Adventure of the Clapham Cook", a TV adaptation of the short story by Agatha Christie and the first episode of the 1989 ITV series. Having been set in the 1930s Art Deco period and external shots of Hercule Poirot's fictional residence Whitehaven Mansions being filmed at Florin Court, the station assists in maintaining the authenticity of the programme and was built within a year of Florin Court.
