= Hampton Ferry =

Hampton Ferry may refer to:

England

- Hampton Ferry (River Avon), a ferry across the River Avon in Worcestershire
- Hampton Ferry (River Thames), a ferry across the River Thames to the west of London
- Hampton Loade Ferry, a ferry across the River Severn in Shropshire
- Hampton Ferry, a sister ship of SS Twickenham Ferry, also referred to at Night Ferry

== See also ==
- Hampton (disambiguation)
