= Hampton High School =

Hampton High School may refer to:

In Australia

- Hampton High School, Melbourne, Hampton, Victoria
- Hampton Senior High School, Morley, Western Australia

In the United States

- East Hampton High School, East Hampton, New York
- East Hampton High School, East Hampton, Connecticut
- Easthampton High School, Easthampton, Massachusetts
- Hampton High School (Arkansas) of Hampton, Arkansas
- Hampton High School (Allison Park, Pennsylvania) of Allison Park, Pennsylvania
- Hampton High School (Florida) of Ocala, Florida
- Hampton High School (Georgia) of Hampton, Georgia
- Hampton High School (Hampton, Tennessee) of Hampton, Tennessee
- Hampton High School (Virginia) of Hampton, Virginia
- New Hampton High School, New Hampton, Iowa
- Wade Hampton High School (Greenville, South Carolina) of Greenville, South Carolina
- Wade Hampton High School (Varnville, South Carolina) of Varnville, South Carolina

Elsewhere

- Hampton High, London, London, UK
- Hampton High School (New Brunswick) of Hampton, New Brunswick, Canada
- Hampton High School, Jamaica of Malvern, Jamaica

== See also ==
- Hampton (disambiguation)#Schools
