= Hampton Academy =

Hampton Academy may refer to:

- Hampton Academy (London), a school in London, England, U.K.
- New Hampton School, an independent college preparatory high school located in New Hampton, New Hampshire, U.S.
- Winnacunnet High School, former Hampton Academy and High School, located in Hampton, New Hampshire, U.S.

== See also ==
- Hampton (disambiguation)#Schools
