= Hampton School District =

Hampton School District may refer to:

- Hampton School District (Arkansas), in Hampton, Arkansas
- Hampton School District (Connecticut), in Hampton, Connecticut
- Hampton School District (New Hampshire), in Hampton, New Hampshire
- Hampton School District (New Jersey) in Hampton, New Jersey
- Hampton City Public Schools in Hampton, Virginia
- Hampton Bays Public Schools in Hampton Bays, New York

== See also ==
- Hampton Township School District (disambiguation)
