= The Hamptons (disambiguation) =

The Hamptons are a group of villages and hamlets in Long Island, New York.

The Hamptons or Hamptons may also refer to:

- Hamptons, Calgary, Canada
- The Hamptons, Edmonton, Canada
- The Hamptons, London, England
- The Hamptons, Long Island AVA, a wine region
- "The Hamptons" (Seinfeld)
- The Hamptons (TV series)
- Hamptons (magazine), distributed in The Hamptons of New York
- The Hamptons: Food, Family, and History, a 2012 cookbook by Ricky Lauren
- Hamptons (estate agent), a real estate brokerage based in London

== See also ==
- Hampton (disambiguation)
- The Hampdens
