= USS Hampton =

USS Hampton has been the name of more than one United States Navy ship, and may refer to:

- USS Hampton (ID-3049), also listed as USS Hampton (SP-3049), a tug in commission from 1918 to 1919
- USS Hampton (APA-115), an attack transport in commission from 1945 to 1946
- USS PCS-1386, a patrol craft sweeper commissioned in 1944, renamed USS Hampton (PCS-1386) in February 1956, decommissioned in April 1956, and used as a non-commissioned training ship until sold in 1959
- USS Hampton (SSN-767), a submarine commissioned in 1993 and currently in active service

== See also ==
- USS East Hampton (SP-573), a patrol vessel, minesweeper, and lightvessel in commission from 1917 to 1919
- Hampton (disambiguation)
