= Hampton Township =

Hampton Township may refer to:

- Hampton Township, Lee County, Arkansas, in Lee County, Arkansas
- Hampton Township, Marion County, Arkansas, in Marion County, Arkansas
- Hampton Township, Rock Island County, Illinois
- Hampton Township, Michigan
- Hampton Township, Dakota County, Minnesota
- Hampton Township, New Jersey
- Hampton Township, Davidson County, North Carolina, in Davidson County, North Carolina
- Hampton Township, Allegheny County, Pennsylvania

== See also ==
- New Hampton Township, Chickasaw County, Iowa
