= Hampton Court branch line =

Railway branch line in Surrey, England

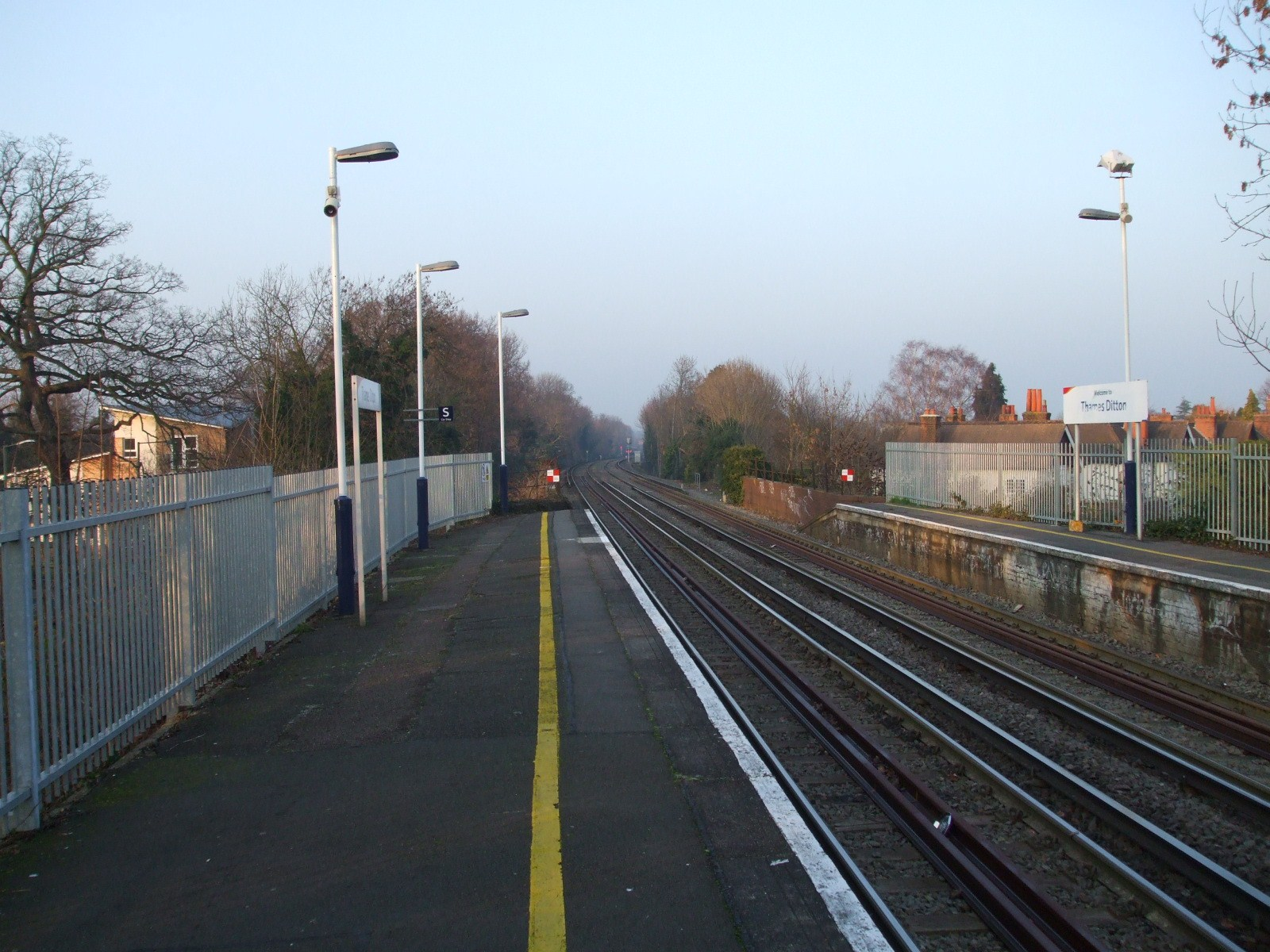
- The line at Thames Ditton station

Overview
- Status: Operational
- Owner: Network Rail
- Locale: Greater London; Surrey; South East England
- Stations: 2

Service
- Type: Suburban rail, Heavy rail
- System: National Rail
- Operator: South Western Railway
- Rolling stock: British Rail Class 450; British Rail Class 701

History
- Opened: 1849

Technical
- Line length: 1.54 miles (2.48 km) (1 mi 51 chains)
- Track gauge: 1,435 mm (4 ft 8 1/2 in) standard gauge
- Electrification: Third rail, 750 V DC
- Operating speed: 40 mph (64 km/h) in the up direction, 45 mph (72 km/h) in the down direction
Route map
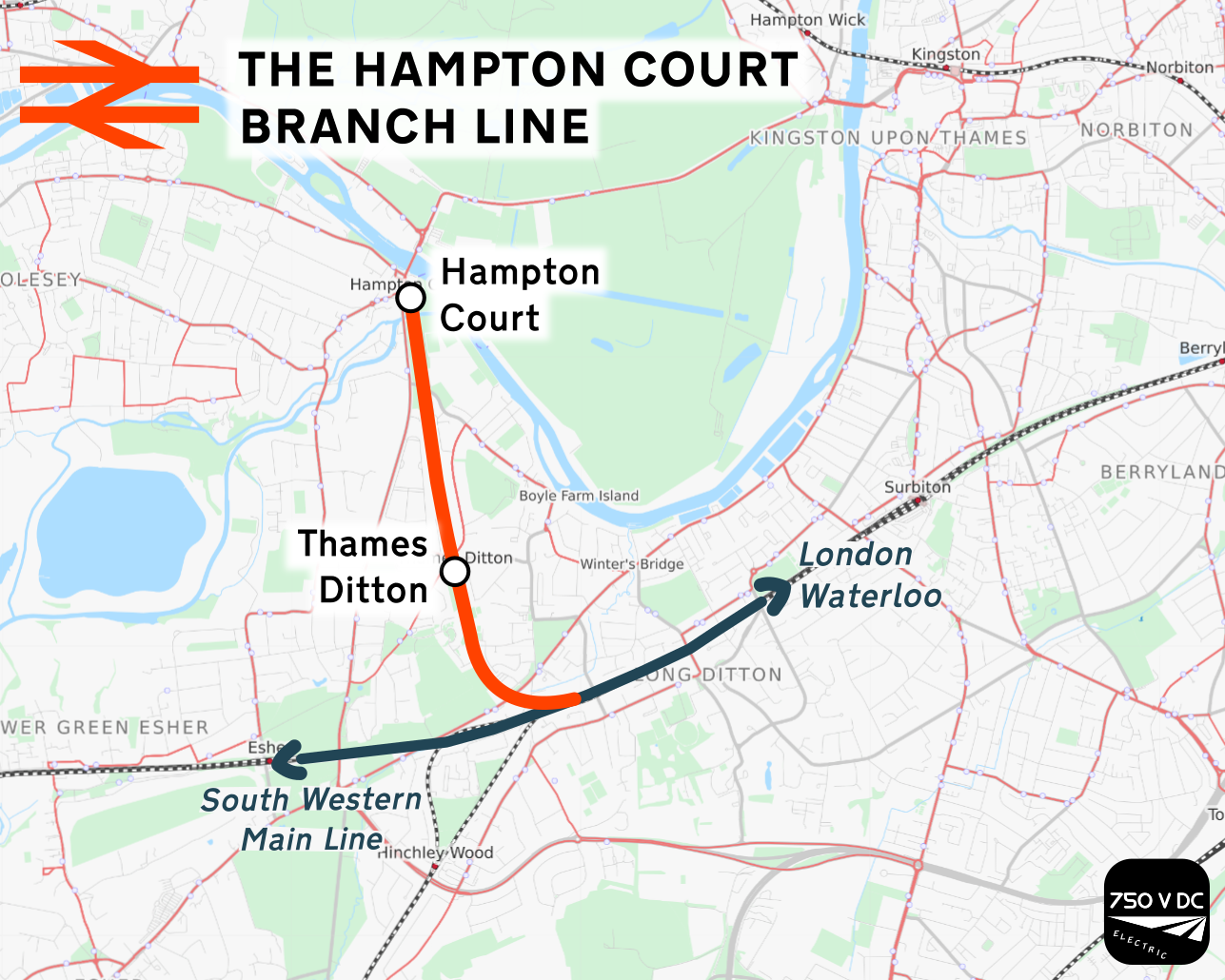
(Click to expand)

The Hampton Court branch line is a 1-mile-52-ch (2.7 km) railway branch line in north Surrey, England. It runs from its terminus, Hampton Court station in East Molesey, via an intermediate station at Thames Ditton to a junction on the South Western Main Line, near Surbiton. The line is double tracked and is electrified using the 750 V DC third-rail system.

The line was constructed by the London and South Western Railway primarily to cater for tourists visiting Hampton Court Palace and opened in 1849. All trains are operated by South Western Railway (SWR) and run to and from London Waterloo via Surbiton and Clapham Junction. SWR manages both stations on the branch.

== Infrastructure and stations ==
The Hampton Court branch line is a double track railway line in north Surrey, England. It runs for 1 mile 52 ch (2.7 km) from its terminus at Hampton Court station to a grade-separated junction with the South Western Main Line,13 miles 27 ch (21.5 km) down the line from London Waterloo. The maximum speed on the branch is 45 mph (72 km/h) in the down direction (away from London) and 40 mph (64 km/h) in the up direction. There is one level crossing on the line, immediately to the south of the terminus, and the majority of the line is built on an embankment, which reaches a maximum height of 18 ft (5.5 m) above the surrounding ground level. The line is electrified using the 750 V DC third-rail system. Signalling is controlled by Woking signal box and Track Circuit Block is in operation.

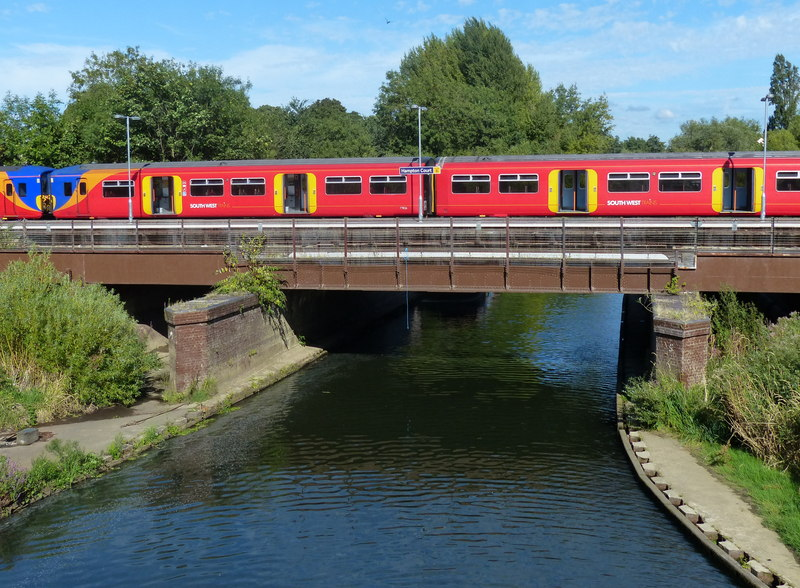
Class 455 units at Hampton Court station with the River Mole below

There are two stations on the branch, both of which have two operational platforms. Hampton Court railway station, the terminus, is 14 miles 76 ch (24.1 km) down the line from London Waterloo and Thames Ditton railway station is 14 miles 1 ch (22.6 km) from Waterloo. All platforms are at least 205 m (673 ft) long and are capable of accommodating 10-carriage trains. Both stations are managed by South Western Railway, which operates all services. The rolling stock used on the line were typically Class 455 electrical multiple units and British Rail Class 456s. After their respective retirements, the British Rail Class 701 has been used to replace them across the SWR network, including this branch line. Trains typically travel the length of the branch in seven minutes and reach London Waterloo from Hampton Court in around 35-40 minutes.

== History ==
=== Authorisation and opening ===
Hampton Court Palace was opened to the public by Queen Victoria in 1838. On 21 May of that year, the first part of the South West Main Line opened between Nine Elms and Woking Common. At first, the closest railway station to the palace was Esher, initially called Ditton Marsh and recorded as "Esher for Hampton Court" in Bradshaw's Guide of 1839. In the mid-1840s, the London and South Western Railway (LSWR) proposed the construction of a branch from the main line with a terminus on the south side of the River Thames at East Molesey to better serve the palace. The company chairman, William Chaplin, noted that the new line would "afford a fresh means of cheap and legitimate recreation to the poorer classes".

The act of parliament authorising the construction of Hampton Court branch line was granted royal assent in July 1846 and the land required was purchased by the LSWR by August the following year. There was a delay before construction started, while the company debated whether to continue the branch towards Staines and Windsor. The engineer, Joseph Locke, was a strong proponent of extending the line towards Berkshire, but after the rival Windsor, Staines and South Western Railway scheme was approved by parliament in 1847, the LSWR decided to build the Hampton Court branch to its original design.

Construction started in January 1848 and the first proving run with a locomotive took place on 1 January 1849. The branch opened a month later on 1 February. Initially six trains per day ran in each direction, four each way on Sundays, with a typical journey time between Waterloo and Hampton Court of around 50 minutes. The return fare was 5 s. (Note: In 1865, 13 of the 47 daily mainline departures from Waterloo were services to Hampton Court.)

A letter published in The Times on 13 February 1849 by a correspondent writing under the pseudonym, Medicus, reported that, a few days earlier, the 12:45 departure from Hampton Court had been hauled by a horse. Once the carriage had reached the junction with the main line, it had then been attached to a steam-hauled service from Dorchester. It is unclear whether this method of operation was a regular occurrence in the first few years after opening. The railway historian, Alan A. Jackson, suggests that horse-power may have been used to mitigate an unstable embankment or because of an initial lack of locomotives.

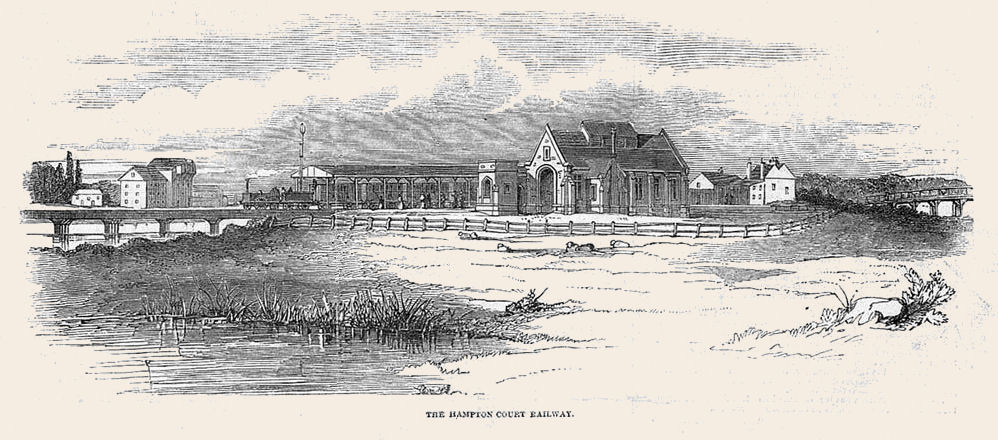
An engraving of Hampton Court station at the time of opening

On opening, Hampton Court railway station had two platforms – one for arrivals and one for departures. It was positioned on an island between the River Mole and River Ember, with access to East Molesey via a drawbridge over the Mole. It is unclear whether the current station building, believed to have been designed by the architect, William Tite, was complete by the time the line opened. The railway historian, Gordon Biddle, suggests that the goods shed may have been used initially by passengers.

In November 1849, the LSWR reported that the branch had cost £36,189 8s 4d to build and that revenue for the first six months had totalled £564. In August 1851, the company stated that it had been disappointed with the financial performance of the line in its first two years of operation, but expressed the expectation that passenger numbers would rise.

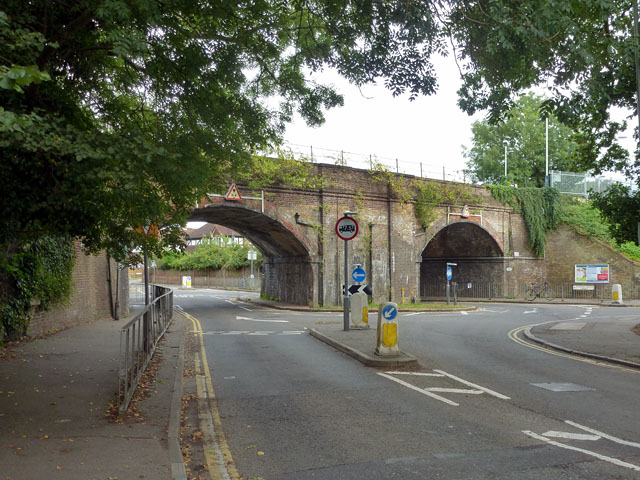
The twin bridges over the B364 at the northern end of the station platforms at Thames Ditton

The station at Thames Ditton opened in November 1851. The station building and station master’s house were built into the east side of the embankment adjacent to the London-bound platform.

The opening of the Hampton Court branch line was slow to promote residential development in the area. Housebuilding began in the Kent Town neighbourhood of East Molesey in the 1860s and in the Thames Ditton area in the final decade of the 19th century. Further substantial suburban growth occurred during the interwar period.

=== Later developments ===
A map of the Molesey area, published in 1870, shows that the terminus had a single arrivals line with platforms on both sides. There was a turntable at the northernmost point of the line and an engine shed on the eastern side of the line. An 1897 map shows a short extension to a wharf beside the Thames, although this appears to have been removed by 1914. The turntable is absent from the 1897 map. A new engine shed was erected at Hampton Court c. 1895 and the original shed, designed by Tite, became the goods shed.

Between 1897 and 1899, the existing platforms at Hampton Court were extended and a new platform was built. The signalling for the new layout allowed arriving and departing trains to use all platforms without shunting. A new 43-lever signal box was constructed at the same time. Pedestrian access to the station was improved with the provision of an additional footbridge over the River Mole in 1905. Hampton Court Bridge, across the Thames, was constructed in mid-1930s, requiring the platforms at the river end of Hampton Court station to be cut back. The goods yard was reduced in size at around the same time and finally closed on 3 May 1965.

The South West Main Line was quadrupled between Surbiton and Hampton Court Junction on 29 July 1883. Until the mid-1910s, trains accessing the branch had to cross the lines heading towards London on the flat. In July 1915, a flyover was opened, carrying the down branch line over the main lines on a 160 ft (49 m) steel truss girder bridge. (Note: The diveunder, allowing trains from Hinchley Wood on the New Guildford Line to access the up main lines, had opened in October 1908.) The Hampton Court branch was included in the first phase of the LSWR suburban electrification programme and electric services began on 18 June 1916. (Note: Three of the four berthing sidings at Hampton Court station were electrified in 1916. The sidings were decommissioned in 1971.) Bomb damage to Hampton Court junction, caused by a V-2 flying bomb on 2 November 1944, closed the branch for two days.

By the end of the 19th century, the line was controlled from a 20-lever signal box adjacent to the level crossing at the southern end of Hampton Court station and a six-lever signal box in the main station building at Thames Ditton. A new signal box was constructed at Hampton Court in 1957 and became fully operational on 15 September 1958. Colour light signalling controlled from Surbiton was implemented on 22 March 1970, although the signal box at Hampton Court was retained to control the level crossing. The box was closed completed on 23 September 1979 when CCTV was implemented, allowing signallers to monitor the crossing remotely.

Demand for travel on the Hampton Court branch was stimulated at the end of the 19th century with the creation of Hurst Park Racecourse in 1889. The course was around 1 mi (1.6 km) to the west of Hampton Court station between the village of West Molesey and the River Thames. (Note: The Hurst Park course was created by relandscaping the former Hampton racecourse. The inaugural race meeting took place on 19 March 1890.) The busiest day of the year on the line was Whit Monday (in late May or early June), when the most popular meeting took place. (Note: On Whit Monday in 1958, trains ran at five-minute intervals on the branch to transport racegoers for Hurst Park. The increased frequency of trains was facilitated by the staffing of Thames Ditton signal box, which enabled the block sections on the line to be shortened and which in the 1950s was only opened on Whit Mondays.) Two additional sidings for race-day traffic were added at Hampton Court station in 1908 and racehorses were transported via the line until the course closed in October 1962. A few months later, Hurst Park was sold to the construction firm, Wates, for £905,000. Housebuilding on the racecourse site began in the late 1960s.

The first annual Hampton Court Flower Show, now known as the Hampton Court Garden Festival, was opened by Anne, Princess Royal in July 1990. It was sponsored by Network SouthEast, the then operators of the branch line, which paid the organisers around £700,000 to subsidise the event. Six trains ran each hour from Waterloo off peak to bring visitors to the show from central London and a spokesperson for Network SouthEast later confirmed that the operator had recouped the cost of the sponsorship from fares. The Network Southeast subsidy for the flower show ended after the July 1992 event.

== Proposals ==
The Hampton Court branch line is proposed to be incorporated into Crossrail 2.

== Bibliography ==
- Biddle, Gordon (1973). Victorian Stations. Newton Abbot: David & Charles. ISBN 978-0-71-535949-5.
- Elliott, Brent (2004). The Royal Horticultural Society: A history 1804-2004. Chichester: Phillimore. ISBN 978-1-86-077272-6.
- Faulkner, J.N.; Williams, R.A. (1988). The LSWR in the twentieth century. Newton Abbott: David & Charles. ISBN 978-0-71-538927-0.
- Green, Chris; Vincent, Mike (1994). The Network Southeast story. Hersham: Ian Allan. ISBN 978-0-86-093653-4.
- Jackson, Alan A. (1999a) [1978]. London's local railways (2nd ed.). Harrow Weald: Capital Transport. ISBN 978-0-71-537479-5.
- Jackson, Alan A. (1999b). The railway in Surrey. Penryn: Atlantic Transport Publishers. ISBN 978-0-90-689990-8.
- Mitchell, Vic; Smith, Keith (1990). Branch lines around Effingham Junction. Middleton Press. ISBN 978-0-90-652074-1.
- Oppitz, Leslie (1988). Surrey railways remembered. Newbury: Countryside Books. ISBN 978-1-85-306005-2.
- Quick, Michael (2023) [2001]. Railway Passenger Stations in Great Britain (PDF) (5.05 ed.). London: Railway and Canal Historical Society.
- Williams, R. A. (1968). The London & South Western Railway. Vol. 1: The Formative Years. Newton Abbot: David & Charles. ISBN 0-7153-4188-X.
- Williams, R. A. (1973). The London & South Western Railway. Vol. 2: Growth and Consolidation. Newton Abbot: David & Charles. ISBN 0-7153-5940-1.
- "Kent / Sussex / Wessex Routes Sectional Appendix" (PDF). Network Rail. 2009.
- "Delivering a better railway for a better Britain | Route Specifications: Wessex" (PDF). Network Rail. 2016.
- Media related to Hampton Court Branch Line at Wikimedia Commons
