= London Waterloo station =

Central London terminus on the National Rail network in the United Kingdom

Waterloo
- London Waterloo
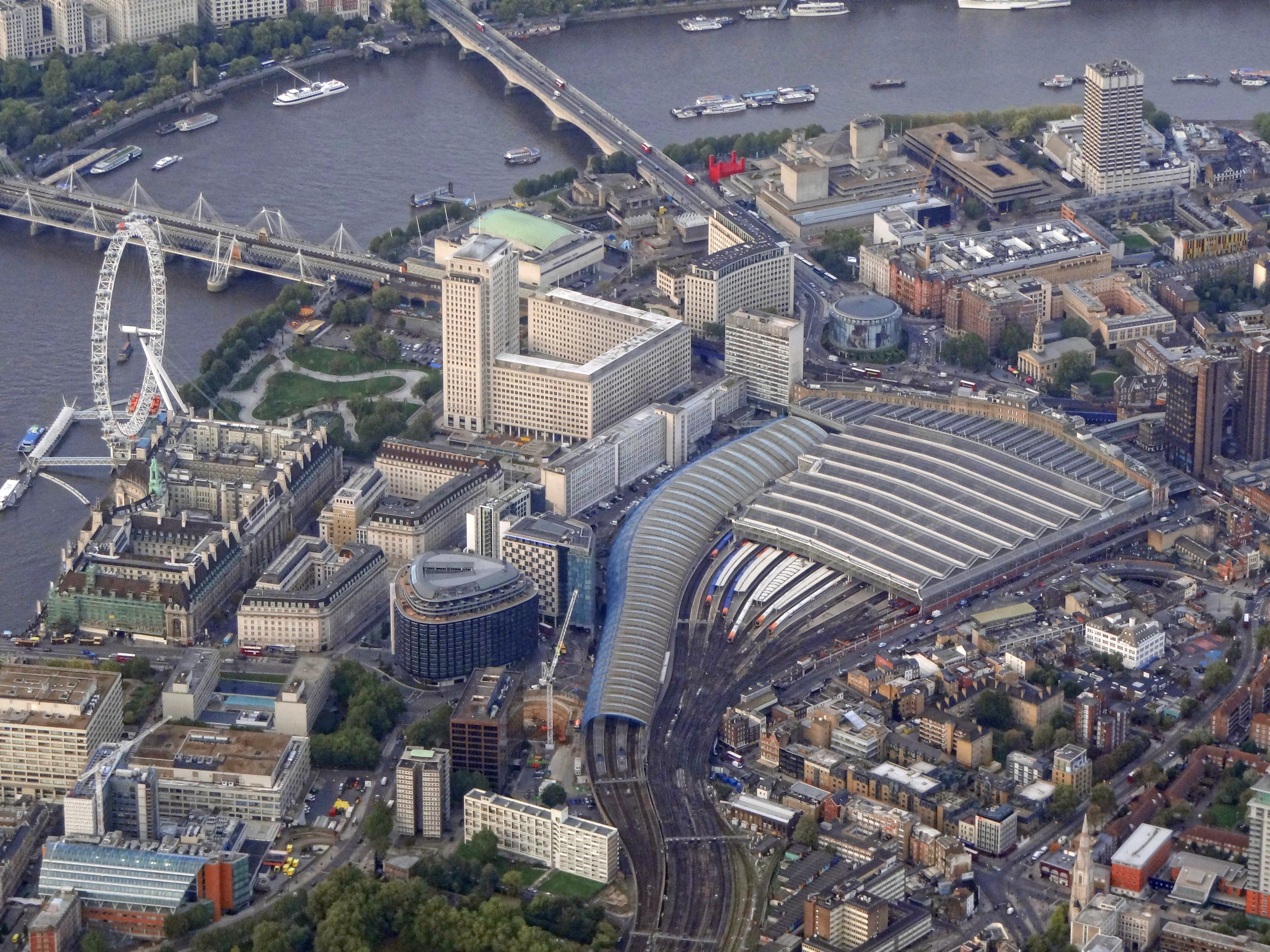
- Aerial view from the south, showing Waterloo station, Waterloo, Hungerford Bridges and the London Eye
- Interactive map of Waterloo

General information
- Location: Waterloo
- Local authority: London Borough of Lambeth
- Managed by: Network Rail
- Station code: WAT
- DfT category: A
- Number of platforms: 24
- Accessible: Yes
- Fare zone: 1
- OSI: Waterloo; Waterloo East; Embankment
- Cycle parking: Yes – external opposite exit 3
- Toilet facilities: Yes

National Rail annual entry and exit
- 2020–21: ▼12.215 million
- Interchange: ▼1.375 million
- 2021–22: ▲41.426 million
- Interchange: ▲3.532 million
- 2022–23: ▲57.790 million
- Interchange: ▲4.664 million
- 2023–24: ▲62.525 million
- Interchange: ▲5.010 million
- 2024–25: ▲70.390 million
- Interchange: ▼4.465 million

Railway companies
- Original company: London and South Western Railway
- Pre-grouping: London and South Western Railway
- Post-grouping: Southern Railway

Key dates
- 11 July 1848: Opened
- 21 March 1922: Rebuilt
- 14 November 1994 – 13 November 2007: Eurostar terminal

Other information
- External links: Departures; Facilities
- Coordinates: 51.5031°N 0.1132°W

Waterloo station (/ˌwɔːtərˈluː/), also known as London Waterloo, is a major central London railway terminus on the National Rail network in the United Kingdom, in the Waterloo area of the London Borough of Lambeth. It is connected to a London Underground station of the same name and is adjacent to Waterloo East station on the South Eastern Main Line. The station is the terminus of the South West Main Line to Weymouth via Southampton, the West of England main line to Exeter via Salisbury, the Portsmouth Direct line to Portsmouth Harbour which connects with ferry services to the Isle of Wight, and several commuter services around west and south-west London, Surrey, Hampshire and Berkshire.

The station was opened in 1848 by the London and South Western Railway, and it replaced the earlier Nine Elms as it was closer to the West End. It was never designed to be a terminus, as the original intention was to continue the line towards the City of London, and consequently the station developed in a haphazard fashion, leading to difficulty finding the correct platform. The station was rebuilt in the early 20th century, opening in 1922, and included the Victory Arch over the main entrance, which commemorated World War I. Waterloo was the last London terminus to provide steam-powered services, which ended in 1967. The station was the London terminus for Eurostar international trains from 1994 until 2007, when they were transferred to St. Pancras.

Waterloo is the second busiest station in the UK, and was formerly the busiest railway station in the UK, handling 70.4 million passengers in the year to March 2025. It is also the UK's largest station in terms of floor space and has the greatest number of platforms.

== Location ==
The station's formal name is London Waterloo, and appears as such on all official documentation. It has the station code WAT. It is in the London Borough of Lambeth on the south bank of the River Thames, close to Waterloo Bridge and northeast of Westminster Bridge. The main entrance is to the south of the junction of Waterloo Road and York Road. It is named after the eponymous bridge, which itself was named after the Battle of Waterloo, a battle that occurred exactly two years prior to the opening ceremony for the bridge.

== History ==
=== Background ===
London and South-western Railway Metropolitan Extensions Act 1845
- Act of Parliament
- Parliament of the United Kingdom
- Long title: An Act to amend the Acts relating to the London and South-western Railway, and to authorize Extensions thereof from the Nine Elms Terminus to a Point near to Waterloo and Hungerford Bridges in the Parish of Saint Mary Lambeth, and to the Thames at Nine Elms in the Parish of Battersea, all in the County of Surrey.
- Citation: 8 & 9 Vict. c. clxv

Dates
- Royal assent: 31 July 1845

Text of statute as originally enacted

The original Waterloo station in 1848

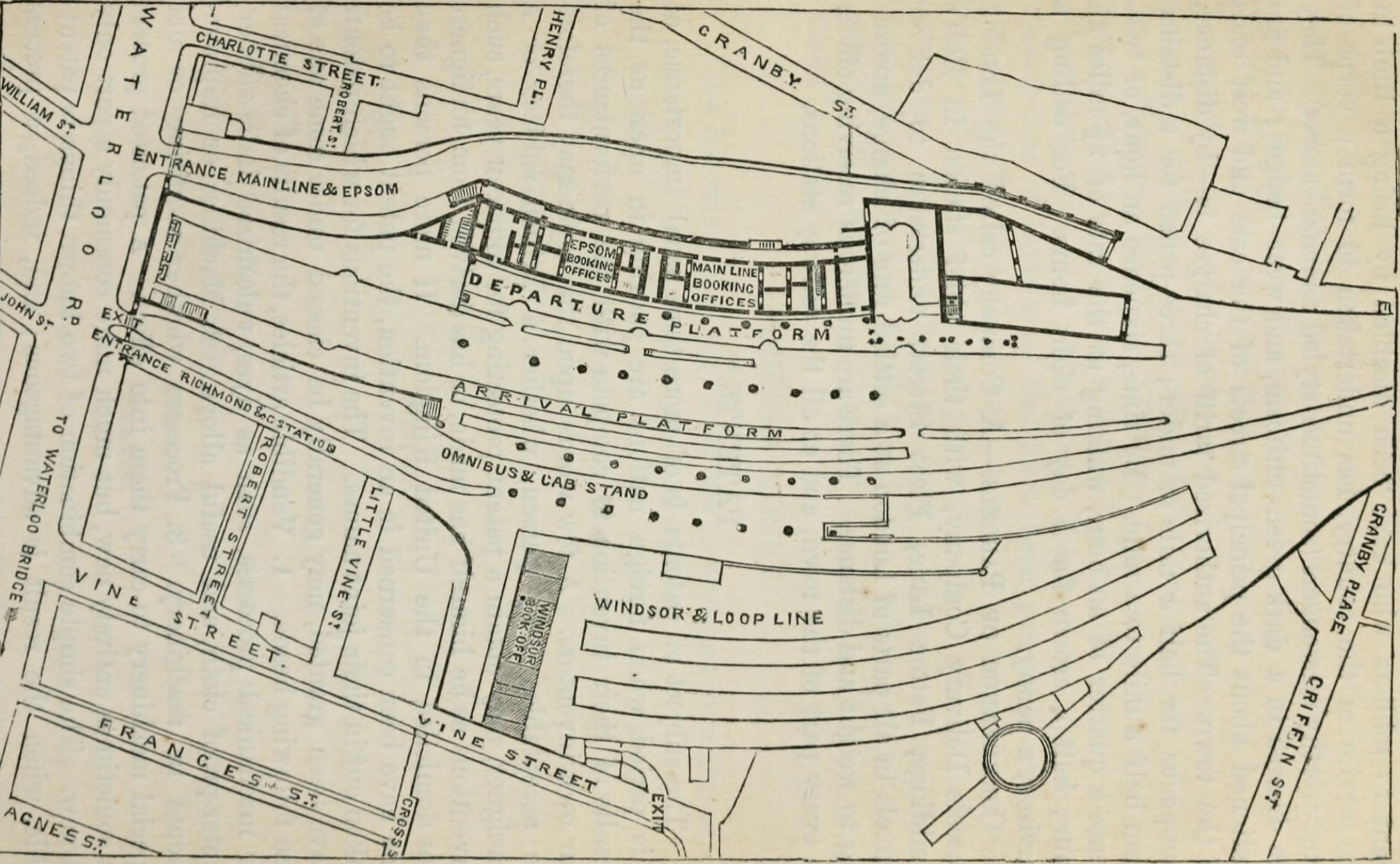
The station in 1862

Waterloo was built by the London and South Western Railway (L&SWR). It replaced the earlier Nine Elms, which opened on 21 May 1838 and had connected London to Southampton since 11 May 1840. By the mid-1840s, commuter services to Wandsworth, Wimbledon, Kingston upon Thames, Ditton Marsh and Weybridge had become an important part of L&SWR traffic, so the company looked for a terminus closer to Central London and the West End. An act of Parliament, the London and South-western Railway Metropolitan Extensions Act 1845 (8 & 9 Vict. c. clxv), was granted in 1845 to extend the line towards a site on York Road, close to Waterloo Bridge. The extension past Nine Elms involved demolishing 700 houses, and most of it was carried on a brick viaduct to minimise disruption. The longest bridge was 90 feet (27 m) long and took the line over Westminster Bridge Road. The approach to the new station carried four tracks, with the expectation that other companies would use it. The station was designed by William Tite and opened on 11 July 1848 as "Waterloo Bridge Station". Nine Elms closed for regular services at the same time, but Queen Victoria was fond of the privacy afforded by the old station, so it was kept open for her, and a replacement private station built on Wandsworth Road in 1854. Waterloo Bridge was not designed to be a terminus, but was originally laid out as a through station, as it was expected that services would eventually continue towards the City of London. The L&SWR purchased several properties along the route, before plans were cancelled following the Panic of 1847. In October 1882, Waterloo Bridge station was officially renamed Waterloo, reflecting long-standing common usage, even in some L&SWR timetables.

=== Expansion ===
London and South Western Railway (Widening and York Road Station Enlargement) Act 1847
- Act of Parliament
- Parliament of the United Kingdom
- Long title: An Act to enable the London and South-western Railway Company to widen and improve the London and South-western Railway from the Junction thereof with the Richmond Railway to the Terminus at Nine Elms, and to enable them to enlarge their intended Station at the York Road, Lambeth.
- Citation: 10 & 11 Vict. c. lxxxviii

Dates
- Royal assent: 2 July 1847

Text of statute as originally enacted

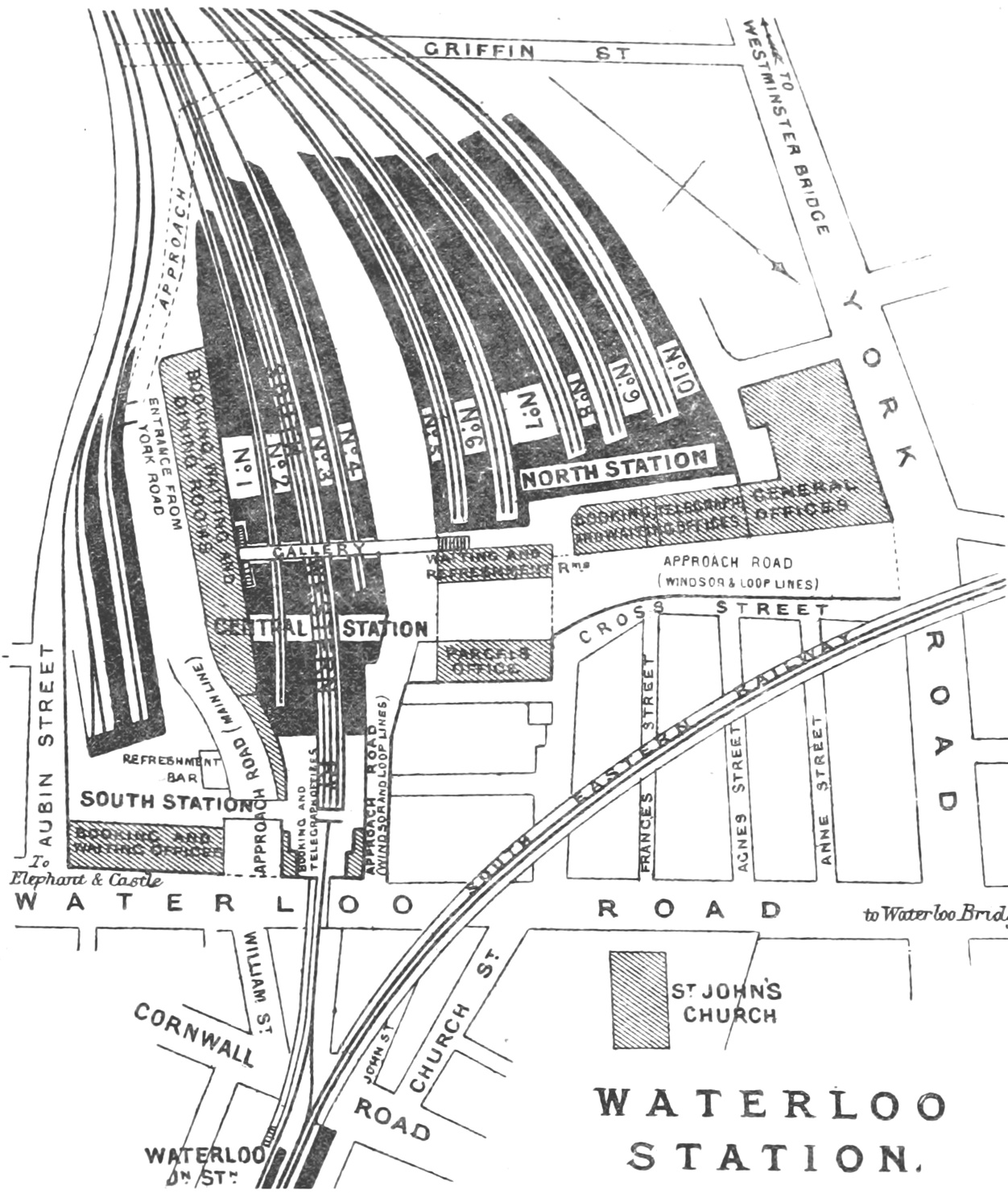
Plan of Waterloo station in 1888

Throughout the 19th century, the L&SWR aimed to extend its main line eastward beyond into the City of London, and was reluctant to construct a dedicated grand terminus at Waterloo. Consequently, the station had none of the usual facilities expected of a terminus until 1853, when a small block was built on the far east side of the station. In 1854, the London Necropolis & National Mausoleum Company opened a private station inside Waterloo that provided services to Brookwood Cemetery. The station was demolished and replaced with a dedicated building in 1902, as part of the reconstruction of Waterloo in the early 20th century.

Traffic and passengers to Waterloo increased throughout the century, and Waterloo was extended in an ad hoc manner to accommodate this. In 1860, new platforms were added on the northwest side of the station; these were known as the Windsor Station after its intended destination. An additional dock siding of the main station opened on 17 March 1869. A 5-chain (330 ft; 100 m) link to the South Eastern Railway (SER) line from London Bridge to Charing Cross opened in July 1865. It was diverted from London Bridge to Cannon Street on 1 February 1867, before being withdrawn the following year. The SER opened Waterloo Junction station on 1 January 1869 as a replacement, that allowed LSWR passengers to change and access services to Cannon Street. A further extension on the southeastern side of Waterloo, to provide more services, opened on 16 December 1878. A further extension to the north, beyond the Windsor Station, opened in November 1885.

For each extension, the long-term plan was that the expansion was "temporary" until the line was extended past Waterloo, and these additions were added alongside and around the existing structure instead of an overall architectural plan. This resulted in the station becoming increasingly ramshackle. The platform numbering had grown in an ad hoc manner, resulting in the confusing situation of No. 1 being in the middle of the station complex, where it had been since 1848. The original station became known as the "Central Station" as other platforms were added. The new platform sets were known by nicknames – the two platforms added for suburban services in 1878 were the "Cyprus Station", and the six built in 1885 for use by trains on the Windsor line became the "Khartoum". Each of these stations-within-a-station had its own booking office, taxi stand and public entrances from the street, as well as often poorly marked and confusing access to the rest of the station.

By 1899, Waterloo had 16 platforms but only 10 numbers allocated in different sections of the station or on different levels; some numbers were duplicated. This complexity and confusion became the butt of jokes by writers and music hall comics for many years in the late 19th century, including Jerome K. Jerome in Three Men in a Boat. It was criticised and satirised in several Punch cartoons.

=== Rebuilding ===
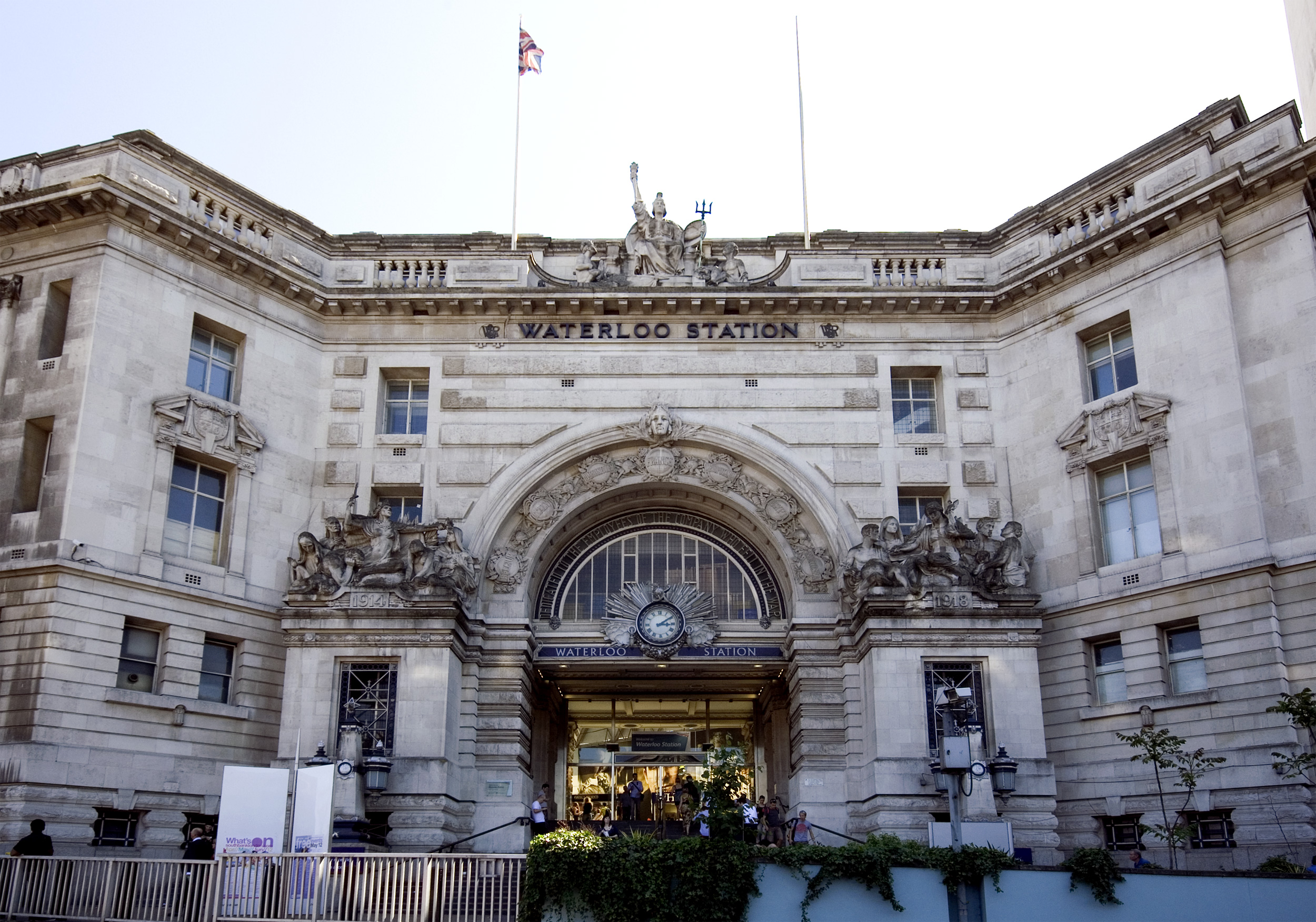
The Victory Arch, the station's main entrance, was constructed by James Robb Scott and commemorates Britain's involvement in World War I.

The L&SWR spent the 1880s and 1890s trying to finalise plans to continue the line beyond Waterloo to the City. An overhead line was proposed in 1882, and again in 1891, but both times was rejected due to cost. The Waterloo and City Railway Act 1893 (56 & 57 Vict. c. clxxxvii) was passed for a tube railway. On 8 August 1898, the company opened the Waterloo & City line, a deep level underground railway that ran directly between Waterloo and Bank–Monument station in the City. This gave the company the direct commuter service it had long desired (albeit with the need to change from surface to underground lines at Waterloo). With Waterloo now destined to remain a terminus station, and with the old station becoming a source of increasingly bad will and publicity amongst the travelling public, the L&SWR decided on total rebuilding, in a project they called the "Great Transformation"

Legal powers to carry out the work were granted in 1899 and 1900. About 6.5 acres (2.6 ha) of land was purchased to accommodate the new building, which included six streets (and part of two others), along with All Saints' Church. The L&SWR built six blocks of flats to rehouse around 1,750 people as compensation for those displaced. Extensive groundwork and slum clearance were carried out before construction on the terminus proper began, including several rundown buildings that had been extensively used for prostitution. By 1903, the land had been cleared for work to start.

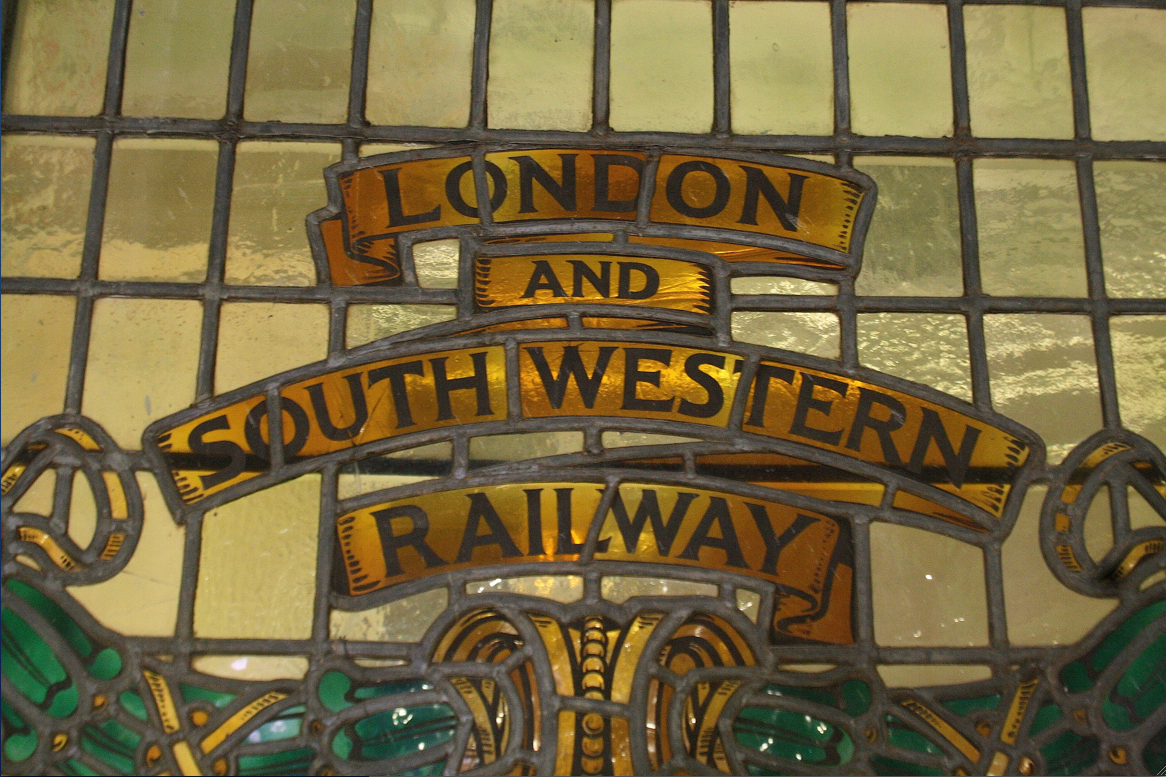
The early 20th-century reconstruction of Waterloo included a stained glass window with the London and South Western Railway's crest.

The new station was opened in stages. It was partially ready in 1909, with the main booking hall opening on 11 June 1911. A vehicular roadway to the station opened on 18 December 1911. The connection to Waterloo Junction was removed that March, but a siding remained until 3 May 1925. The bridge remained in place and was used as a walkway between the two stations. Construction of the main station continued sporadically throughout World War I, and the new station finally opened in 1922, with 21 platforms and a 700-foot (210 m) long concourse. The roof and platforms were initially designed by John Wykeham Jacomb-Hood, who travelled to the US to look at station designs for inspiration. Following Jacomb-Hood's death in 1914, work was taken over by Alfred Weeks Szlumper. It was built in an Imperial Baroque style out of Portland stone. James Robb Scott designed the office range. The new station included a large stained glass window depicting the L&SWR's company crest over the main road entrance, surrounded by a frieze listing the counties served by the railway (the latter still survives today). These features were retained in the design, despite the fact that, by the time the station opened, the Railways Act 1921 had been passed, which spelt the end of the L&SWR as an independent concern.

Waterloo was a major terminal station for soldiers in World War I, and for sailors travelling to Southampton for the British Expeditionary Force. It also handled ambulance trains and mail from overseas. A free buffet operated at the station between December 1915 and April 1920. The station saw little damage, except for an explosion on one of the lines on 29 September 1917.

The rebuilt station was formally opened on 21 March 1922 by Queen Mary. The main pedestrian entrance, the Victory Arch (known as Exit 5), was designed by Scott and is a memorial to company staff who were killed during the war. Upon opening, it marked 585 employees who had been killed in World War I. It was flanked by two sculptures featuring Roman goddesses; "1914" with Bellona in armour with a sword and torch, and "1918" showing Pax, the goddess of Peace sitting on Earth.

=== Southern Railway ===
The LSWR began to look at electrification of suburban services during the 1910s, using a 600 volt DC third rail mechanism. The first such service to Wimbledon via East Putney opened on 25 October 1915, with services to Shepperton following on 30 January 1916, the Hounslow Loop Line on 12 March and Hampton Court on 18 June. Ownership of Waterloo underwent a succession, broadly typical of many British stations. Under the 1923 Grouping it passed to the Southern Railway (SR). The SR continued the third rail electrification of lines from Waterloo, including a full service to Guildford on 12 July 1925, and to Windsor on 6 July 1930.

A public address system first ran in Waterloo on 9 March 1932, and by the following decade was regularly broadcasting music around the station. In 1934, the SR planned to invest £500,000 (£31 million as of 2025) to improve the signalling and track layout to allow better use of all platforms. A full electric service to Woking, Guildford and Portsmouth Harbour (for the Isle of Wight) opened on 4 July 1937, as did connecting services to Aldershot and Alton. On 1 January 1939 an electric service opened between Waterloo and Reading, with a branch to Camberley and Aldershot, which was designed equally for the anticipated increase in military traffic in the area as well as commuters.

Waterloo was bombed several times during World War II. On 7 September 1940, the John Street viaduct immediately outside the station was destroyed by a bomb, which prevented any services running for 12 days. Full services did not resume until 1 October, which particularly affected mail traffic with over 5,000 unsorted bags piling up on the station platform. Waterloo was closed again after bombing on 29 December 1940. It re-opened on 5 January 1941, on the same day that station offices on York Road were destroyed by bombing. The station took heavy damage again after an overnight raid on 10–11 May 1941, with fires lasting for four days. One 2,000-pound (910 kg) bomb was not discovered until it was uncovered during building work along York Road in 1959.

=== British Rail and privatisation ===
Following nationalisation in 1948, ownership of the station transferred to British Railways (BR) as part of the Southern Region. Under BR, more of the network was electrified and boat train traffic declined in favour of air travel. Waterloo was the last London terminus to run steam-hauled trains. The final journey took place on 9 July 1967 and featured a large group of rail enthusiasts with cameras and recording equipment, attempting to capture the departure of the final steam service to Bournemouth. The electrified service began the next day.

The station was managed by Network SouthEast also under BR. Following the privatisation of British Rail, ownership and management passed to Railtrack in April 1994 and finally, in 2002, to Network Rail.

=== Eurostar ===
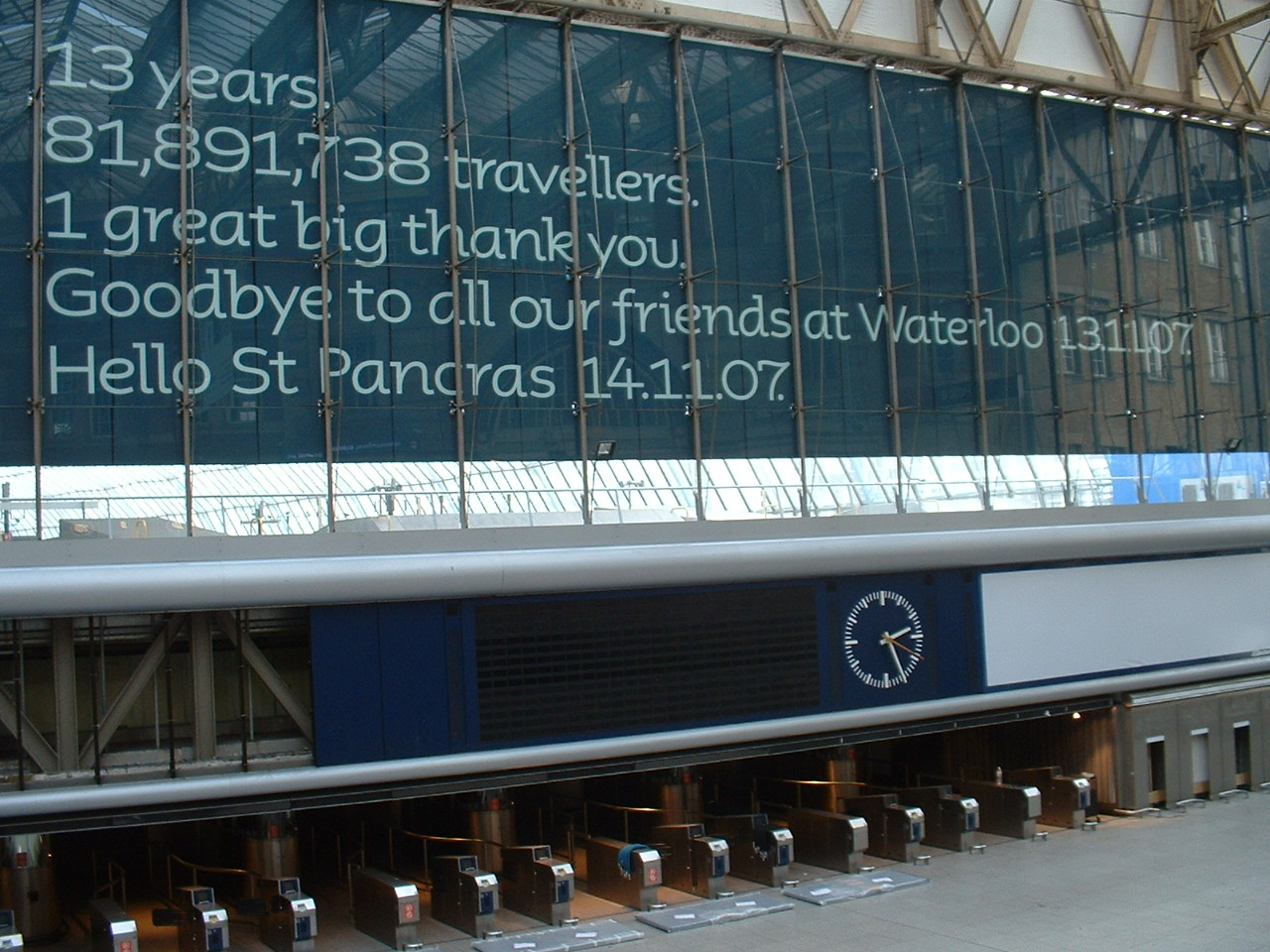
Farewell message from Eurostar to the former International station, viewed from the western side of the main concourse, December 2007

Although the London terminus of the international railway connection via the Channel Tunnel had long been planned to be in the north of London, the major construction works required to accommodate this plan had not started by the time the Channel Tunnel was completed in 1994. Instead, five new platforms were built on the western side of Waterloo station, replacing platforms 20 and 21. The new Waterloo International railway station was the first London terminus of Eurostar international trains to Gare du Nord, Paris and Brussels-South. An inaugural service left Waterloo on 6 May for a joint opening ceremony with Queen Elizabeth II and the French president François Mitterrand. Regular services began on 14 November. Construction necessitated the removal of decorative masonry forming two arches from that side of the station, bearing the legend "Southern Railway". This was re-erected at the private Fawley Hill Museum of Sir William McAlpine, whose company built Waterloo International.

In the meantime, London and Continental Railways (LCR), created at the time of British Rail privatisation, was selected by the government in 1996 to reconstruct St Pancras railway station, which it had owned since privatisation, as well as a new rail connection, the Channel Tunnel Rail Link (CTRL), to link St Pancras to the Channel Tunnel.

Construction of the CTRL, the second phase of High Speed 1, was completed in 2007, and Waterloo International closed on 13 November 2007 when the Eurostar service transferred to the new St Pancras International station. Ownership of the former Waterloo International terminal then passed to BRB (Residuary) Limited.

=== Heathrow Airport links ===
Waterloo station was to be the central London terminus for the proposed Heathrow Airtrack rail service. This project, promoted by British Airport Authority Limited (BAA), envisaged the construction of a spur, from Staines on the Waterloo to Reading line, to Heathrow Airport, creating direct rail links from the airport to Waterloo, Woking and Guildford. Airtrack was planned to open in 2015, but was abandoned by BAA during 2011. That October, Wandsworth Council proposed a revised plan called Airtrack-Lite, which would provide trains from Waterloo to Heathrow, via the same proposed spur from Staines to Heathrow, but, by diverting or splitting current services, the frequency of trains over the existing level crossings would not increase. BAA's earlier plan had controversially proposed more trains over the level crossings, leading to concerns that they would be closed to motorists and pedestrians for too long.

=== Former international platforms ===
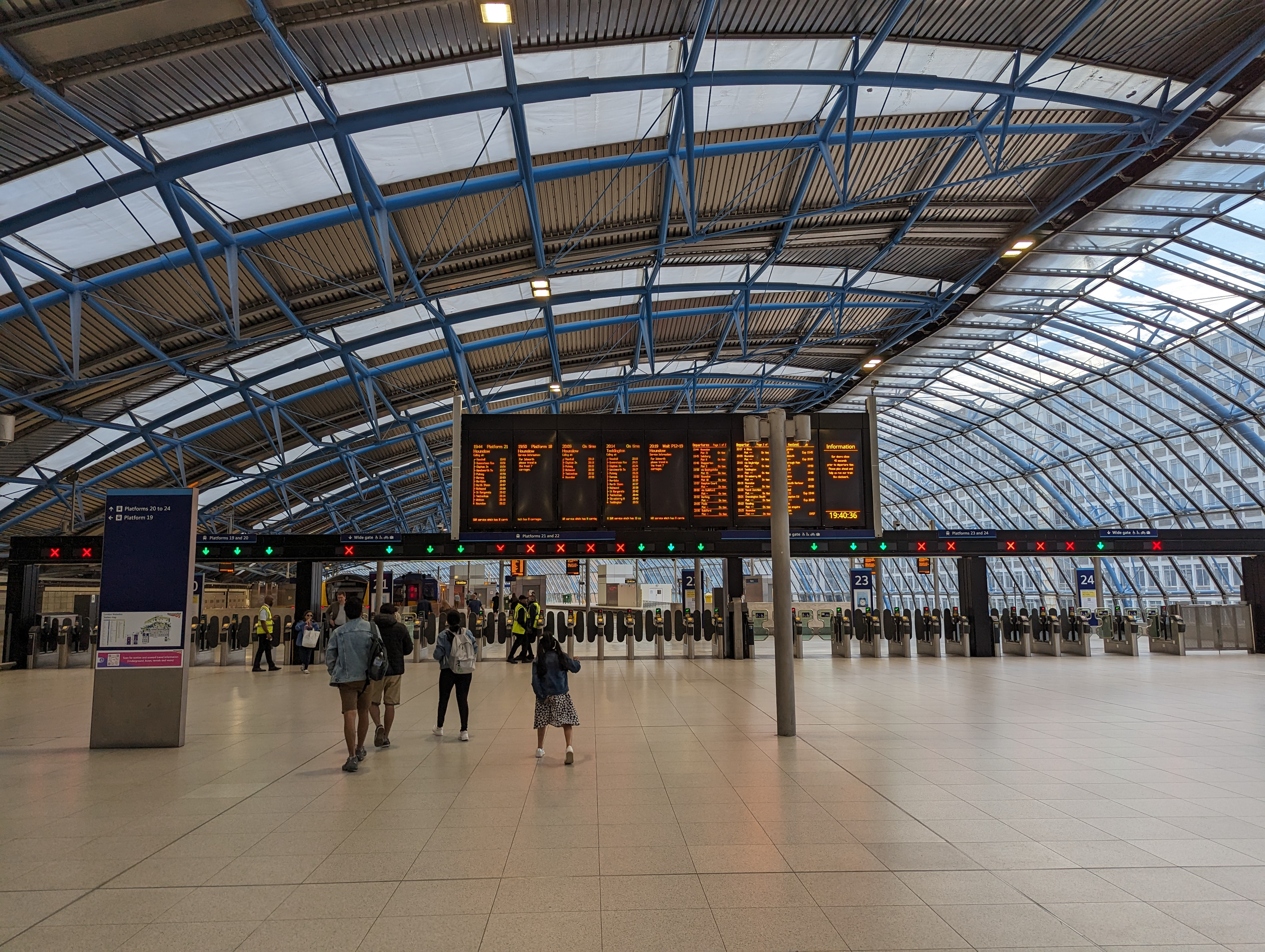
Refurbished ex-international terminal platforms (20 to 24) at London Waterloo. (2023)

After the transfer of Eurostar services from Waterloo, the former Eurostar platforms 20–24 of Waterloo International remained unused until they were fully brought back into service in May 2019, after partial re-opening in December 2018. Waterloo suffered significant capacity problems, until the former international station was brought back into service for domestic use. In December 2008 preparatory work was carried out to enable platform 20 to be used by South West Trains suburban services. However, the conversion of the remaining platforms was delayed as it required alterations to the track layout outside the station. Platforms 20–22 were reopened for domestic use at the end of 2018. The final set, 23–24, opened in May 2019. The refurbishment and reopening of platforms 20–24 increased capacity at Waterloo by 30%. The international platforms were only designed to cope with six trains per hour, well below the current capacity for commuter services.

The project was criticised for its delayed completion date; in 2009 the Department for Transport confirmed that Network Rail was developing High Level Output Specification options for the station, with an estimated date for the re-opening of the platforms of 2014, seven years after their closure. The cost of maintaining the disused platforms up to late 2010 was found via a Freedom of Information request to have been £4.1 million. South West Trains subsequently confirmed that platform 20 would be brought back into use in 2014, hosting certain services to and from Reading, Windsor, Staines and Hounslow. These would be 10-car trains newly formed from refurbished SWT and former Gatwick Express rolling stock. Platform 20 reopened in May, with access via platform 19, and platforms 21 and 22 in October after steps were constructed over the former Eurostar entrance to access the platforms.

=== Platform lengthening (1–4) ===
In May 2016, it was announced that platforms 1 to 4 would be lengthened to allow new ten-car Class 707 trains to run. Work started on 5 August 2017, and was completed on 28 August.

== Accidents and incidents ==
There have been relatively few accidents at Waterloo compared to other London terminal stations. On 21 August 1896, an engine leaving the locomotive yard overran its clearance point, colliding with a departing passenger train. Five passengers were injured. On 5 May 1904, a linesman accidentally stepped on a signal wire. This gave a false clear signal to a goods van, which collided with a passenger train, killing one, while on 25 October 1913, a collision between two passenger trains at Waterloo Junction killed three people.

On 13 April 1948, the goods hoist to the Waterloo and City line began to sink while a M7 class tank engine was pushing loaded coal wagons onto it. The engine dropped into the hoist's shaft, ending up upside-down and spurting steam over it. The driver and fireman managed to jump free, and the locomotive was rescued piecemeal and used for spares.

On 3 June 1960, an empty stock train formed of two 4COR electric multiple units overran signals and was in a sidelong collision with a steam-hauled passenger train that was departing for Weymouth, Dorset. A few people suffered slight injuries. On 11 April the following year, an electric multiple unit overran signals and was in a head-on collision with a steam locomotive. One person was killed and fifteen were injured.

On 10 March 2000, a passenger train collided with an empty stock train in platform 5 due to driver error. Thirty-five people were injured.

On 15 August 2017, a Class 456 electric multiple unit collided with an engineers' train at the station. The passenger train was derailed, causing disruption for the remainder of the day. Three people were checked for injuries, but nobody was hospitalised. The cause was both a change to the interlocking, that failed to be accounted for in the test regime and that a temporary connection for testing had not been removed (probably added to overcome the change to the interlocking – it was entirely undocumented and unapproved) which meant that a set of points not correctly set was not detected. This allowed a proceed signal to be shown when it should not have been possible to do so. The problem would have been indicated to the signaller when a previous train 'ran through' the points and moved them had the temporary connection been removed. The temporary connection prevented this detection by providing a false feed to the detection relay. The Rail Accident Investigation Branch (RAIB) investigation into the accident concluded that mistakes were made similar to those which caused the Clapham Junction rail crash in 1988. The RAIB expressed concerns that lessons learnt from that accident were being forgotten over time.

== Station facilities ==
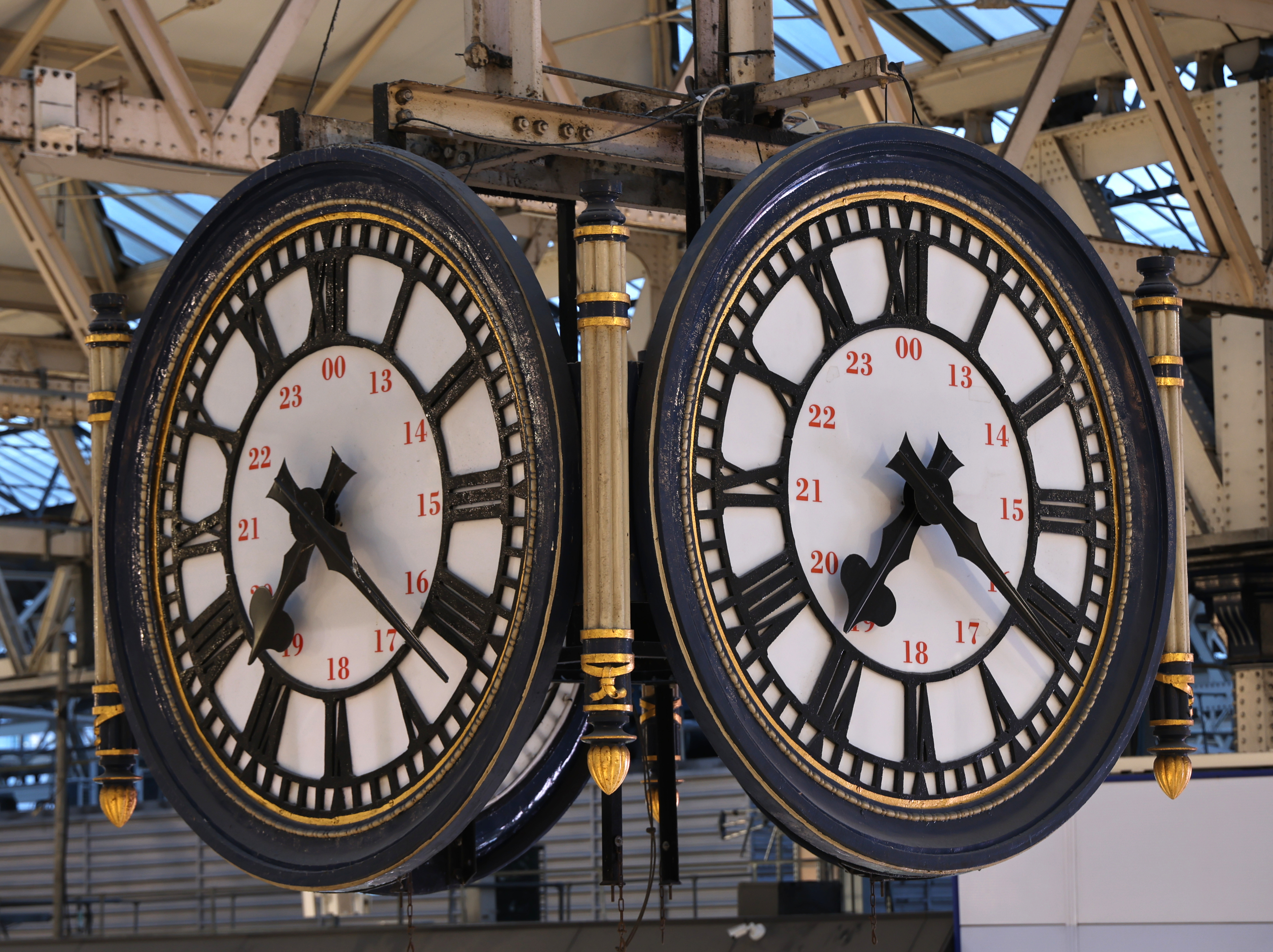
Waterloo station clock

The major transport interchange at Waterloo comprises London Waterloo, Waterloo East, Waterloo Underground station, and several bus stops. There are more than 130 automated ticket gates on the station concourse, along with another 27 in the subway below.

A four-faced clock hangs in the middle of the main concourse. Each panel has a diameter of 5 feet 6 inches (1.68 m). It was erected as part of the early 20th century rebuilding and designed by Gents' of Leicester. In 2010, the clock was fitted with technology to automatically switch to and from British Summer Time. Meeting "under the clock at Waterloo" is a traditional rendezvous.

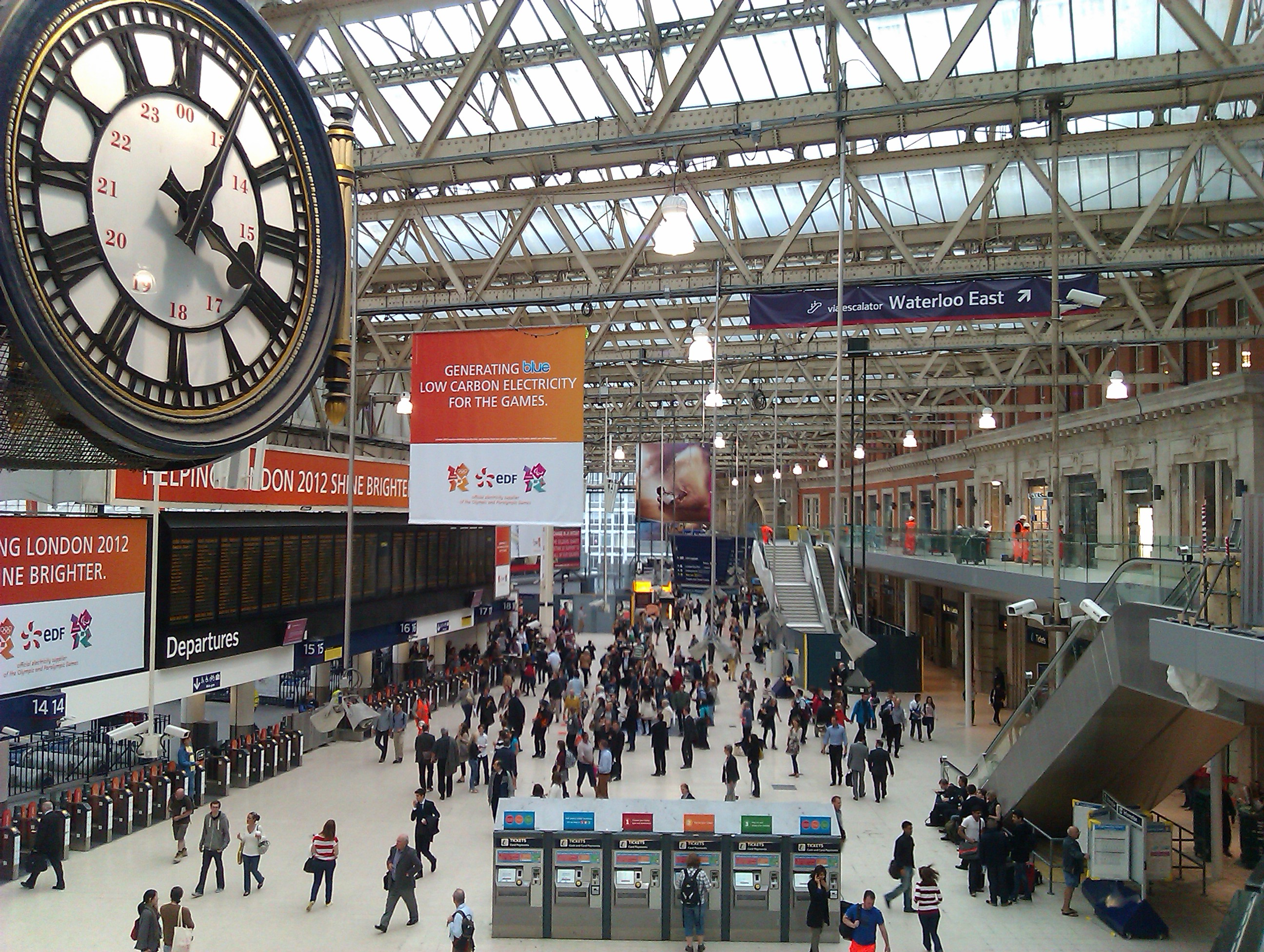
Waterloo station clock, concourse, and retail balcony, 2012

=== Platforms ===
There are 24 platforms at this station, numbered 1–24 from the South East to the North West (left to right when viewed from the passenger entrance):

- Platforms 1–6 are generally used for suburban services on the South West Main Line towards Wimbledon, Guildford and Woking.
- Platforms 7–16 are generally used for long distance service on the South West Main Line towards Basingstoke, Portsmouth, Weymouth and Exeter
- Platforms 17–24 are generally used for services on the Waterloo–Reading line.

In contrast, platforms at London Waterloo East are lettered to avoid confusion with the numbered platforms at this station.

=== Retail balcony ===
Network Rail has constructed a balcony along almost the whole width of the concourse at the first-floor level. The project's aims were to provide 18 new retail spaces and a champagne bar, reduce congestion on the concourse, and improve access to Waterloo East station by providing additional escalators leading to the high-level walkway between Waterloo and Waterloo East. Retail and catering outlets have been removed from the concourse to make more circulation space. First-floor offices have been converted into replacement and additional retail and catering spaces. Work was completed in July 2012, at a cost of £25 million.

=== Police station ===
The British Transport Police maintained a police station by the Victory Arch at Waterloo, with a custody suite of three cells. Although relatively cramped, it served over 40 police officers until the late 1990s. The police station shut in February 2009, following the closure of the Eurostar Terminal at Waterloo. The railway station is now policed from a new Inner London Police Station a few yards from Waterloo at Holmes Terrace. Until July 2010, the Neighbourhood Policing Team for Waterloo consisted of an inspector, a sergeant, two constables, special constables, and 13 police community support officers.

=== Bus station ===
A large number of London Buses routes serve the station area day and night. A bus station on Waterloo Road located opposite the BFI IMAX was opened in summer 2004.

== Services ==
=== South Western Railway ===
The main part of the railway station complex is known as "Waterloo Main" or simply Waterloo. This is the London terminus for services towards the south coast and the south-west of England. All regular trains are operated by South Western Railway. Waterloo main line station is one of nineteen in the country that are managed by Network Rail and the station complex is in London fare zone 1.

Waterloo has been Britain's busiest railway station by patronage, with just under 100 million National Rail passenger entries/exits in 2015–16. Waterloo railway station alone is the 91st-busiest in the world as of 2013. However, including National Rail interchanges, the Underground station, and Waterloo East, the complex handled a total of 211 million arrivals and departures in the 2015/2016 financial year (not including interchanges on the Underground). It is therefore the busiest transport hub in Europe. It has more platforms and a greater floor area than any other station in the UK (though Clapham Junction, just under 4 miles (6 km) down the line, sees the greatest number of passengers alighting or departing trains).

As of 2017, the South Western Railway run around 1,600 trains per day, used by over 651,000 passengers, making it Europe's busiest commuter service. According to the Estimates of Station Usage, there were 94,192,690 entries and exits at Waterloo during 2018–19, continuing to be the highest in the country. Along with other stations, usage dropped dramatically as a result of the COVID-19 pandemic. In 2019, Waterloo was the busiest railway station in the UK, with an estimated 86.9 million passenger entries/exits. It had been the busiest in the country for 16 consecutive years until patronage fell 86% in 2020/21 to 12.2 million due to the pandemic, ranking it fourth in terms of usage. In 2023, London Liverpool Street overtook it as the busiest in London, as well as the United Kingdom as a whole, following the completion of the Elizabeth line.

The following off-peak weekday services are operated in trains per hour (tph) as of August 2026:

London Suburban Services:

- 2 tph to London Waterloo via Wimbledon, Kingston, and Richmond (clockwise), these trains are advertised as to Strawberry Hill
- 2 tph to London Waterloo via Richmond, Kingston, and Wimbledon (anti-clockwise), these trains are advertised as to Teddington
- 2 tph to Shepperton via Kingston
- 2 tph to Hampton Court
- 2 tph to Woking via Surbition (Stopping service)
- 2 tph to Chessington South
- 1 tph to Dorking via Epsom
- 2 tph to Guildford via Cobham
- 1 tph to Guildford via Epsom

Long distance and main line services:

- 2 tph to Basingstoke via Woking
- 2 tph to Alton via Woking
- 1 tph to Poole via Basingstoke, Southampton Central and Bournemouth
- 2 tph to Weymouth (1 fast, 1 semi-fast) via Southampton Central, Bournemouth and Poole
- 1 tph to Haslemere via Woking and Guildford
- 2 tph to Portsmouth Harbour (1 fast, 1 semi-fast) via Woking, Guildford and Haslemere
- 1 tph to Portsmouth Harbour via Woking, Winchester and Eastleigh
- 1 tph to Salisbury via Basingstoke and Andover
- 1 tph to Exeter St Davids via Salisbury and Yeovil Junction

Reading and Windsor Lines:

- 2 tph to Reading via Richmond, Ascot and Wokingham
- 2 tph to Windsor & Eton Riverside via Richmond and Staines
- 2 tph to Weybridge via Hounslow and Staines, these services are advertised as to Addlestone to prevent people going to Weybridge travelling on this service instead of faster SWML services.

| Preceding station | National Rail | Following station |
|---|---|---|
| Terminus | South Western Railway; Waterloo to Woking; Reading and Windsor lines Mole Valley line Kingston loop line Hounslow loop line Hampton Court line New Guildford line | Vauxhall or Clapham Junction |
| Terminus | South Western Railway; Waterloo to Basingstoke; Alton line | Clapham Junction or Surbiton |
| Terminus | South Western Railway; South West Main Line; Portsmouth Direct line West of England main line | Clapham Junction or Woking |
| | Disused railways | |
| Terminus | Eurostar | Ashford; International |

=== Southeastern ===
Adjacent to the main station is Waterloo East, the last stop on the South Eastern Main Line towards London before the terminus at Charing Cross. Waterloo East has four platforms, which are lettered A to D rather than numbered to avoid confusion with the numbered platforms in the main station by staff who work at both stations. Waterloo East is managed and branded separately from the main station. Trains go to southeast London, Kent and parts of East Sussex. All regular services are operated by Southeastern.

During August 2017, some Southeastern trains were diverted into Waterloo via the former Eurostar connection line between Vauxhall and Clapham High Street whilst engineering works took place between Hither Green and London Charing Cross/Cannon Street/Blackfriars via London Bridge.

=== River ===
London River Services operate boats from nearby London Eye Pier (also known as the Waterloo Millennium Pier) and Festival Pier, and run to the City and Greenwich. The piers also provide access to corporate and leisure services.

== London Underground ==
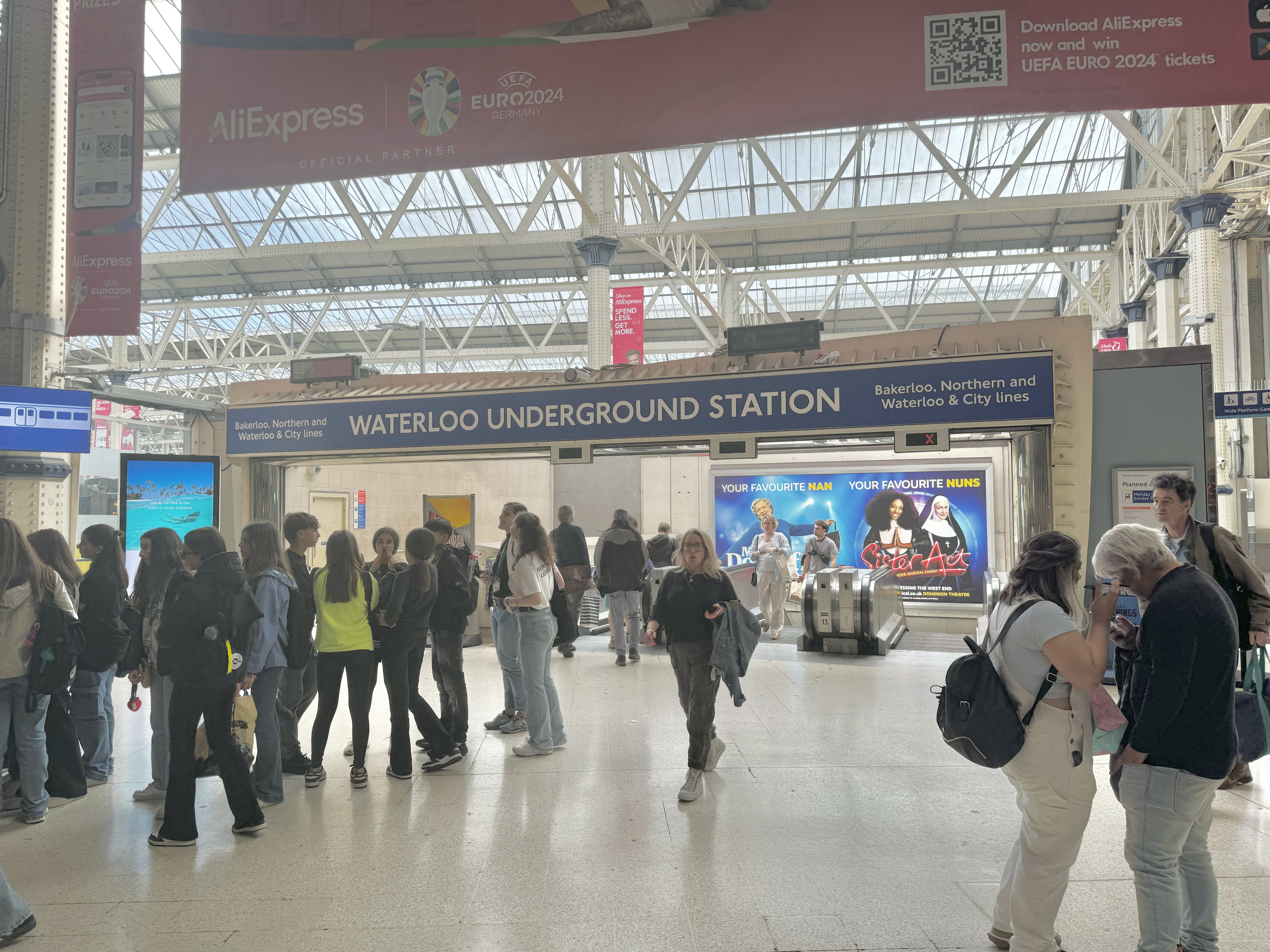
The tube station entrance at the main concourse

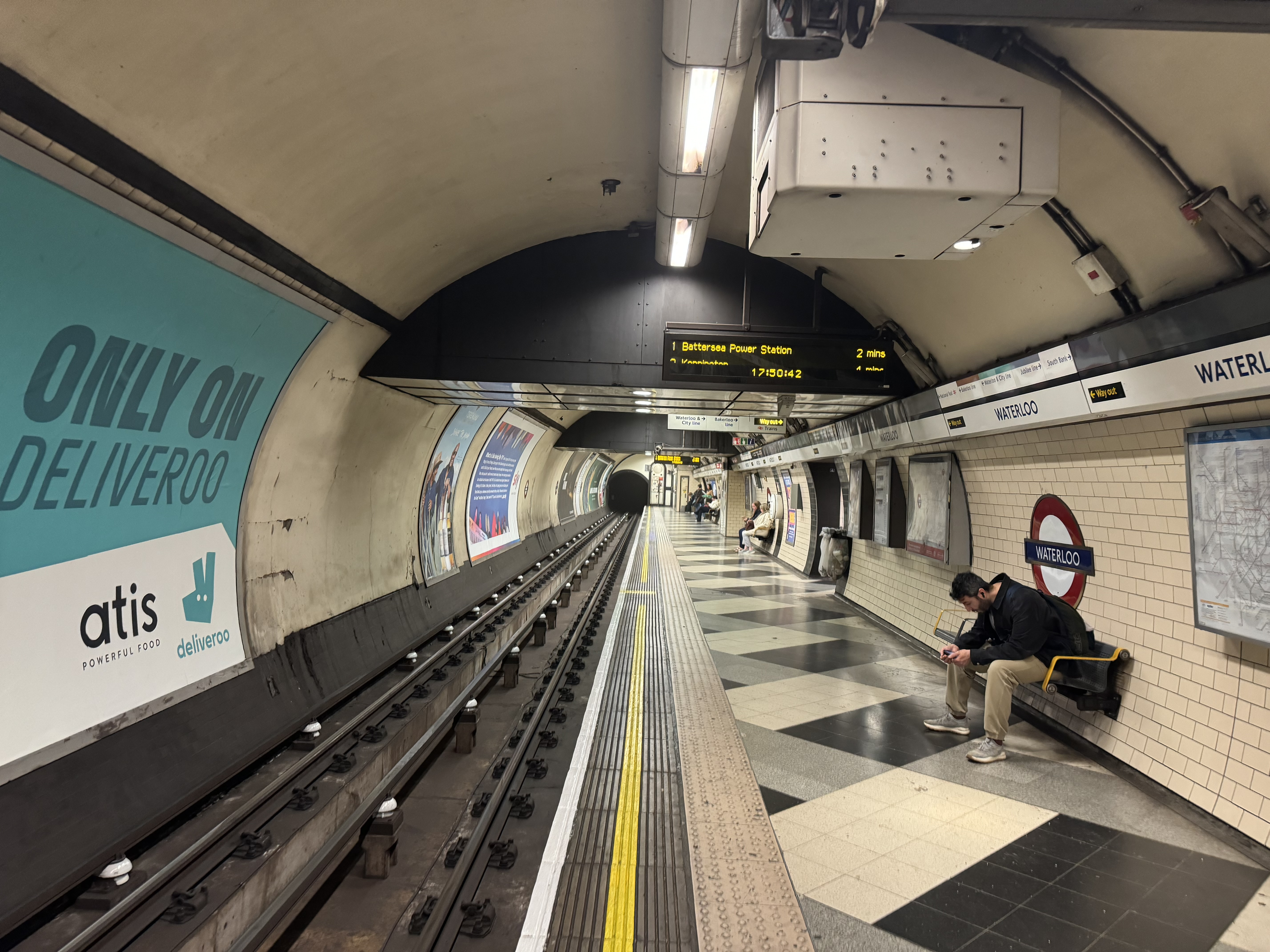
The Northern line southbound tube platform

There had been plans to connect Waterloo to the West End via an underground railway since the 1860s. The Waterloo & Whitehall Railway began construction of a line towards Whitehall, but it was abandoned in 1868 because of financial difficulties. The first underground line to be opened at Waterloo was the Waterloo & City Railway to Bank, colloquially known as "The Drain" owing to its access via a sloping subway at the Bank end. It opened on 8 August 1898, and was part-owned by the L&SWR, who took over full ownership in 1907. It was primarily designed for commuters and not normally open on Sundays. Since the COVID-19 pandemic, the line has only been open on weekdays.

The Baker Street and Waterloo Railway (now part of the Bakerloo line) opened on 10 March 1906, and was initially accessed from Waterloo by lifts at the York Road end of the station. The Northern line's station at Waterloo opened on 13 September 1926, as part of the overall extension from Charing Cross to Kennington. The Jubilee line station opened on 24 September 1999 as part of the eastward extension to Stratford.

| Preceding station | London Underground | Following station |
|---|---|---|
| Embankment towards Harrow & Wealdstone | Bakerloo line | Lambeth North towards Elephant & Castle |
| Embankment towards Edgware, Mill Hill East or High Barnet | Northern line Charing Cross Branch | Kennington towards Battersea Power Station, Morden or Kennington |
| Westminster towards Stanmore | Jubilee line | Southwark towards Stratford |
| Terminus | Waterloo & City line | Bank Terminus |

== Cultural references ==
In the 1990s, after Waterloo station was chosen as the British terminus for the Eurostar train service, Florent Longuepée, a municipal councillor in Paris, wrote to the British Prime Minister Tony Blair requesting that the station be renamed because he said it was upsetting for the French to be reminded of Napoleon's defeat when they arrived in London by Eurostar. There is a name counterpart in Paris: the Gare d'Austerlitz is named after the Battle of Austerlitz, one of Napoleon's greatest victories (over the Russians and Austrians).

The clock at Waterloo has been cited as one of the most romantic spots for a couple to meet, and fictional examples include Derek "Del Boy" Trotter meeting Raquel in the British sit-com Only Fools and Horses and Jack meeting Nancy in the film Man Up.

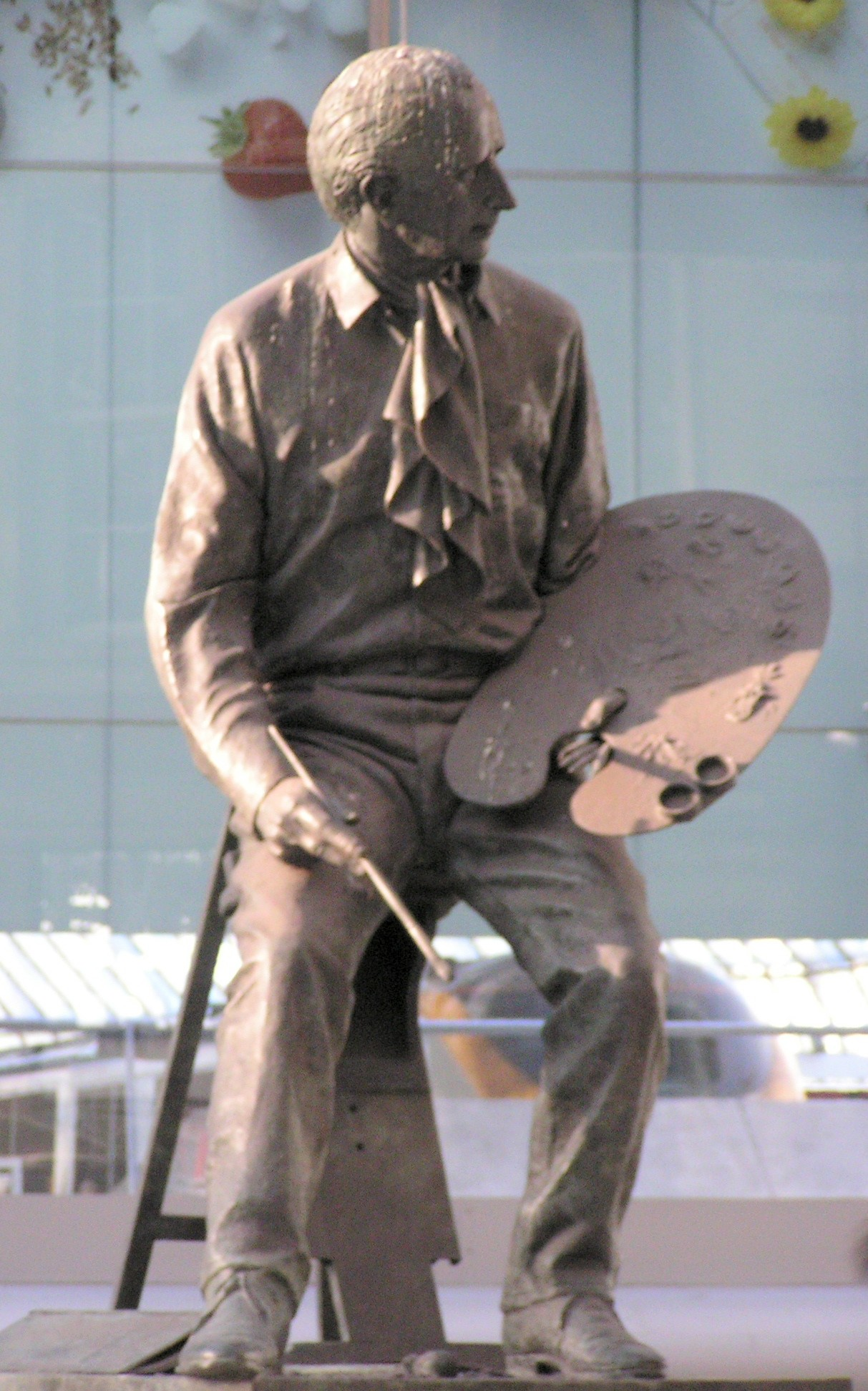
The statue of Terence Cuneo by Philip Jackson formerly at Waterloo

Waterloo has appeared in fiction several times. In Jerome K. Jerome's 1889 comic novel, Three Men in a Boat, the protagonists spend some time in the station, trying to find their train to Kingston upon Thames. After being given contradictory information by every railway employee they speak to, they eventually bribe a train driver to take his train to their destination. In Robert Louis Stevenson and Lloyd Osbourne's 1889 novel The Wrong Box, much of the farcical plot revolves around the misdelivery of two boxes at Waterloo station, and the attempts by the various protagonists to retrieve them. In H. G. Wells' 1897 science fiction novel, The War of the Worlds, the little used, and long since vanished, connecting track across the station concourse to Waterloo East station makes an appearance. John Cowper Powys refers to the Waterloo Station steps in Wolf Solent where his protagonist, when leaving Waterloo for Dorset at the start of the novel, sees a vagrant with a face of "inert despair" who haunts him throughout the ensuing action as a reminder of eternal human suffering. The station features prominently in the action film The Bourne Ultimatum, with a complex chase sequence and assassination.

The station is the subject of John Schlesinger's 1961 documentary film Terminus, while the 1970 British Transport film Rush Hour includes several scenes filmed in the station. The underground scenes in the 1998 romantic comedy Sliding Doors were partly shot at Waterloo tube station.

Two well-received images of the station are the two Southern Railway posters "Waterloo Station – War" and "Waterloo Station – Peace", painted by Helen McKie for the 1948 centenary of the station. The two pictures show hundreds of busy travellers all in exactly the same positions and poses, but with altered clothing and roles. The preparatory sketches for these were drawn between 1939 and 1942.

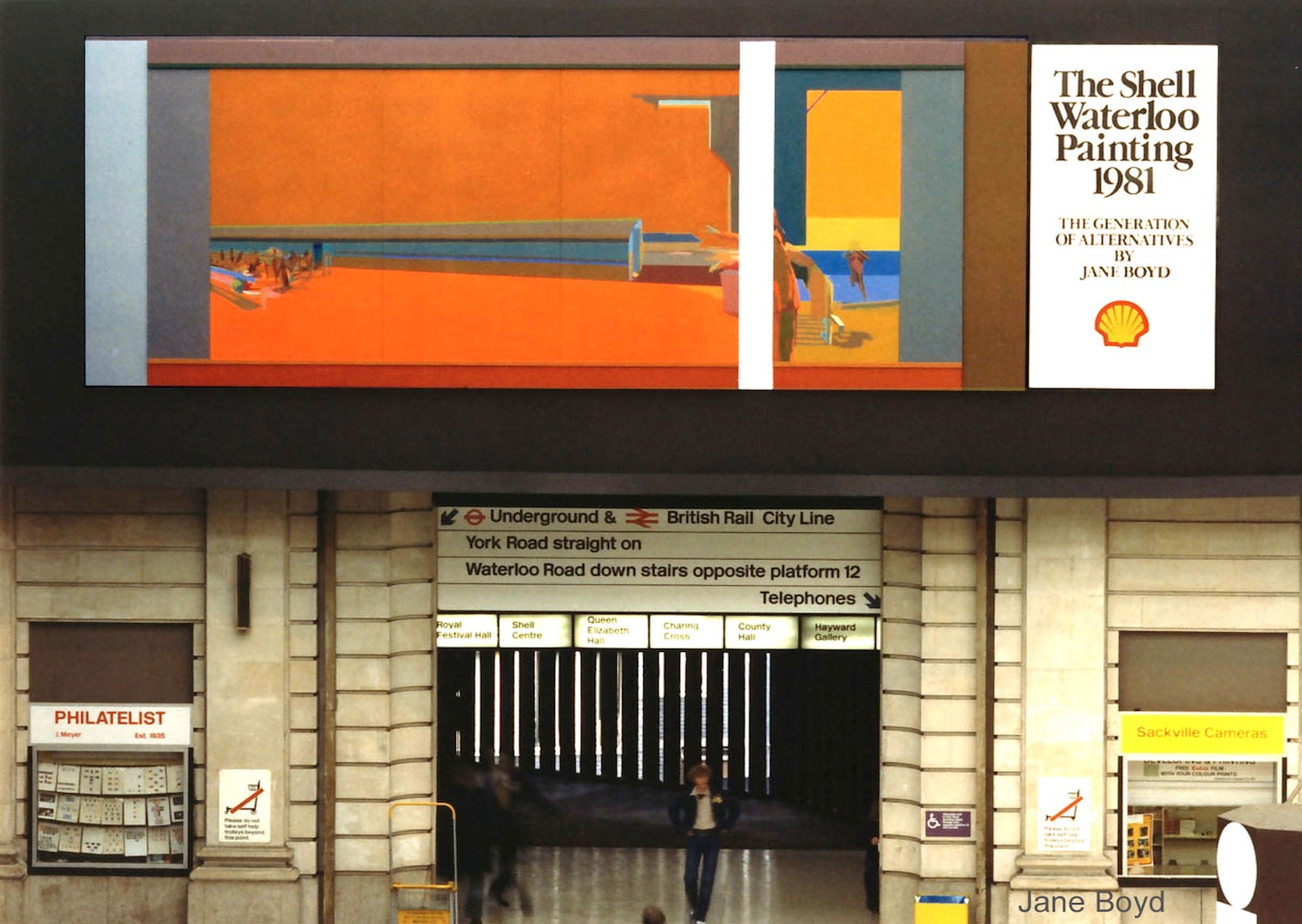
Shell Waterloo Painting 1981 – The Generation of Alternatives by Jane Boyd

In 1981, Shell UK ran a competition a work of art to be exhibited above Waterloo's Shell exit. The winner, Jane Boyd, went on to be Fellow Commoner in Creative Arts at Trinity College, Cambridge. Other paintings of the station include the huge 1967 work by Terence Cuneo, in the collection of the National Railway Museum. A statue of Terence Cuneo by Philip Jackson was installed on the concourse in 2004. It was removed in 2014 during remodelling of the concourse.

In 2010, two of the disused platforms hosted a theatrical performance of The Railway Children by E. Nesbit. The audience was seated either side of the actual railway track. The show included the use of a steam locomotive coupled to one of the original carriages from the 1970s film (propelled by a diesel locomotive). The performance moved to London after two acclaimed summer runs at the National Railway Museum in York.

Waterloo and Waterloo Underground are the setting for the Kinks' song "Waterloo Sunset", recorded in 1967. It was originally titled "Liverpool Sunset" but changed as the band decided there were too many songs about that city. Its lyric describes two people (Terry and Julie) meeting at Waterloo Station and crossing the river, and was also inspired by the 1951 Festival of Britain. The band's biographer, Nick Hasted said the song "has made millions contemplatively pause around Waterloo, a busy urban area the record gives a sacred glow".
