= Hampton One-Design =

Sailboat class

Development
- Designer: Vincent Serio
- Location: United States
- Year: 1934
- No. built: 900
- Builder: Vincent Serio
- Role: One-design racer
- Name: Hampton One-Design

Boat
- Displacement: 755 lb (342 kg)
- Draft: 3.50 ft (1.07 m) with centerboard down

Hull
- Type: Monohull
- Construction: Wood or fiberglass
- LOA: 18.00 ft (5.49 m)
- LWL: 14.00 ft (4.27 m)
- Beam: 5.79 ft (1.76 m)

Hull appendages
- Keel: centerboard
- Rudder: transom-mounted rudder

Rig
- Rig type: Bermuda rig

Sails
- Sailplan: Fractional rigged sloop
- Total sail area: 175 sq ft (16.3 m^{2})

Racing
- D-PN: 92.0

The Hampton One-Design is an American sailing dinghy that was designed by Vincent Serio as a one-design racer and first built in 1934.

The boat design was chosen by a Hampton Yacht Club committee that was formed to select a sloop for racing on the Chesapeake Bay, with its shallow waters.

== Production ==
The first 500 boats were constructed by the designer, Vincent Serio in the United States. At least 60 boats were built from fiberglass as well, once the class rules were amended to permit that material. By 1994, 710 boats had been built and 900 have now been completed. The type club has specifications and plans available for amateur construction.

== Design ==
The Hampton One-Design is a recreational sailboat, built predominantly of cedar wood or, since 1961 of fiberglass, with wooden trim. It has a fractional sloop rig with wooden or aluminum spars. The hull has a spooned raked stem, an angled transom, a transom-hung rudder controlled by a tiller and a retractable centerboard. It displaces 755 lb (342 kg).

The boat has a draft of 3.50 ft (1.07 m) with the centerboard extended and 7 in (18 cm) with it retracted, allowing beaching or ground transportation on a trailer.

The class rules were amended in 1962 to allow a trapeze and aluminum spars. No spinnaker or genoa are used and the boat is sailed with just a mainsail and jib.

The design has a Portsmouth Yardstick racing average handicap of 92.0 and is normally raced with a crew of one or two sailors.

== Operational history ==
The boat is supported by an active type club, the Hampton One-Design Class Racing Association, which regulates the design and organizes races.

By 1994 there was a fleet of 40 boats racing from the St. Mary's River Yacht Club on the St. Marys River, Maryland.

In a 1994 review Richard Sherwood wrote, "look for Hamptons in the Chesapeake Bay. A very strict, one-design class association was established in 1938, when 70 boats were racing ... They have always been quick in light airs, but with the trapeze, they may also be sailed in heavier conditions."

== See also ==
- List of sailing boat types
