= Hampton station (New Brunswick) =

Railway station in New Brunswick, Canada

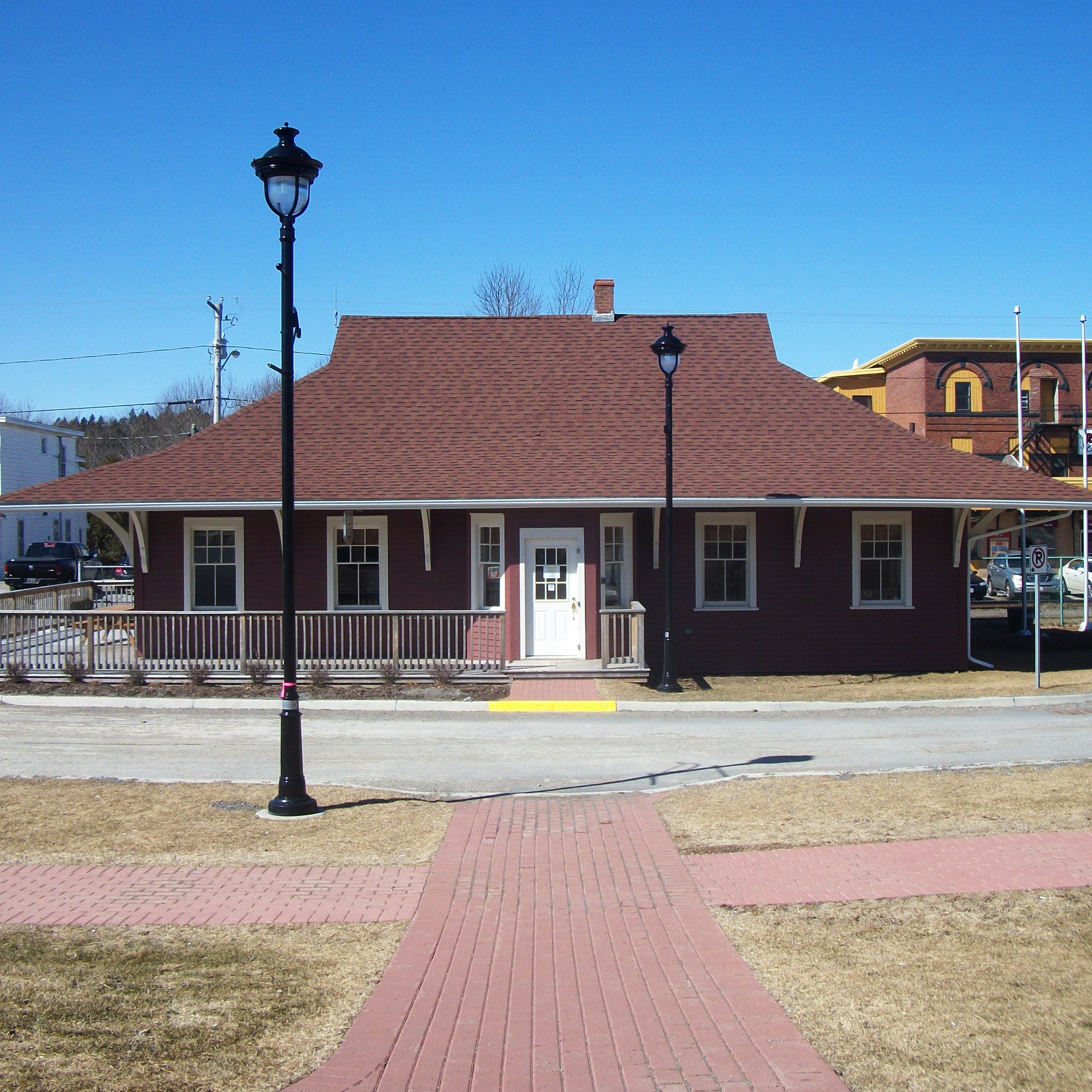
- Hampton station, seen here in 2013, is now a tourist bureau.

General information
- Location: 657 Main Street, Hampton, New Brunswick E5N 6C6; Canada
- Coordinates: 45.52585°N 65.8282°W

History
- Opened: 1921
- Closed: 1994
Location

Hampton station is a former Canadian National Railway station building in Hampton, New Brunswick, Canada. It is now used as a tourist information centre.

The community obtained rail service in 1859 with the opening of the European and North American Railway to Saint John, connecting to Moncton in 1860. Passenger service continued until 1994. The tracks are still in use for freight as Canadian National Railway operate them as a secondary mainline. There was also rail service to St. Martins in the late nineteenth century on the Hampton and St. Martins Railway.
