= Hampton College (Durban, South Africa) =

Coordinates: 29.86311°S 31.00819°E

Hampton College, a South African college, was established in 1985. It is situated in Durban and is a private school.
