= Hampton Township School District =

Hampton Township School District may mean either of

- Hampton Township School District (New Jersey)
- Hampton Township School District (Pennsylvania)
