= Hampton Court railway station =

National Rail station in Surrey, England

Hampton Court
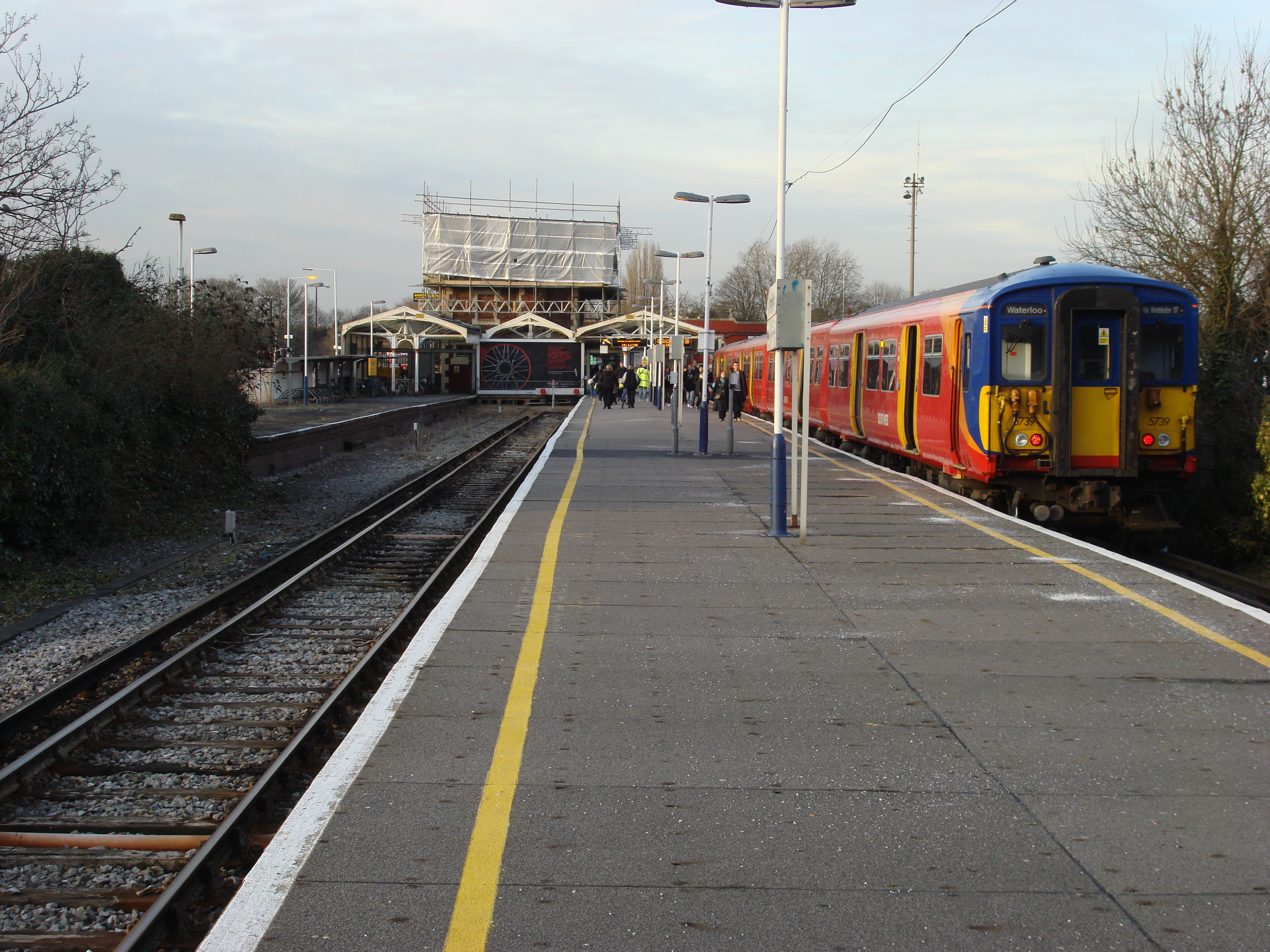
- Interactive map of Hampton Court

General information
- Location: East Molesey
- Local authority: Elmbridge
- Managed by: South Western Railway
- Station code: HMC
- DfT category: C2
- Number of platforms: 2
- Accessible: Yes
- Fare zone: 6

National Rail annual entry and exit
- 2020–21: ▼0.299 million
- 2021–22: ▲0.864 million
- 2022–23: ▲1.107 million
- 2023–24: ▲1.323 million
- 2024–25: ▲1.469 million

Key dates
- 1 February 1849: Opened

Other information
- External links: Departures; Facilities
- Coordinates: 51.4028°N 0.3425°W

Hampton Court railway station is a suburban terminus station at East Molesey, in the Borough of Elmbridge in the county of Surrey, 100 yards short of Hampton Court Bridge, the midpoint of which is a boundary of Greater London. The station is 14 miles 76 chains (24.1 km) down the line from London Waterloo.

Across the River Thames the station serves Hampton Court Palace and its adjoining park-side houses, riverside homes, hotels and boutiques in the London Borough of Richmond upon Thames, and is in Transport for London's London fare zone 6; the station is across the River Thames from Hampton Court Park, Gardens and Bushy Park, and adjacent to Cigarette Island Park.

== History ==
The oldest artifact discovered in the area was a Stone Age era dugout canoe found in the River Mole/River Ember, which is now on display in the museum at Henley-on-Thames. The ground where the station and Park is sited was previously owned by the Church, then Hampton Court Palace, and then gifted to the local council between 1670 and 1840. The station is the terminus of the 1.5-mile (2.4 km) Hampton Court branch line that has one junction – with the South West Main Line (west of Surbiton). One through station is on the branch, Thames Ditton. The station was built on the island formed between the river River Mole and its close distributary, the River Ember. Access was first via a wooden bridge from Creek Road. The branch was opened on 1 February 1849. In its first two years the carriages were pulled by horses.

Regular steam locomotives replaced the horses in the year 1849–1850 tender-first when proceeding down the line (rather than "up" to London), while construction of the first turntable was underway. By 1868 four lines, four platforms, a railway turntable, a coal depot and ancillary buildings comprised a greater version of the site. The peak capacity of this station was between 1912 and 1929 when over 10 tracks fanned out at the site; four sets of tracks were designated for shuffle sidings (to augment services to the rest of the network); four were dedicated for the station itself and two lines were goods sidings for goods including bulk materials and the coal depot. During this period a Thames-side turntable was removed (the foundations of which were revealed on proposed redevelopment by in 2013).

In the 1930s the bed of the mouth of the Mole was filled in and the stream combined with the River Ember to construct Hampton Court Way and the Edward Lutyens-designed, re-aligned Hampton Court Bridge. The station site is owned by Network Rail, and the services operated by South Western Railway using the Class 455 fleet.

Since the 1960s the area adjacent to the river end of the site has been associated with a river ferry landing stage, and an open area with views to the Palace and up and down the River Thames from a "tea and dance room" known as the "Jolly Boatman" (under which the station's Victorian era train turntable was found during archeological excavation in 2013). This closed in the early 1990s and has since been left derelict by the various owners.

== Services ==
All services at Hampton Court are operated by South Western Railway.

The typical service on all days of the week is two trains per hour to and from London Waterloo via Wimbledon which start and terminate at Hampton Court.

Preceding station	National Rail	Following station
Thames Ditton	South Western Railway Hampton Court Branch Line	Terminus
