= Judy Juanita =

American poet, novelist and playwright

- Born: Judith Hart; 1946 or 1947 (age 79–80); Berkeley, California, U.S.
- Education: San Francisco State University

Judy Juanita is an American poet, novelist and playwright. She is a lecturer in the College Writing Programs at the University of California, Berkeley. She was formerly a writing teacher at Laney College. In 1968, while attending San Francisco State, Juanita served as editor-in-chief of The Black Panther, the newspaper of the Black Panther Party (BPP). In her semi-autobiographical novel, Virgin Soul, (Viking, 2013), a black teen starts community college in Oakland, struggles to matriculate and then joins the Black Panther Party. The story of the female foot soldier in the black power movement, Virgin Soul exposes the unheralded women working behind-the-scenes in the BPP and the black student movement..

Juanita's writing is archived at Duke University in the John Hope Franklin Research Center for African and African American History & Culture, alongside the archives of student activists from SNCC.

Eleven of her plays are archived at the Jerome Lawrence & Robert E. Lee Theatre Research Institute, Ohio State University (OSU), where her full-length play, "Theodicy," won a major prize in the Eileen Heckart Senior Play Competition 2008.

== Biography ==
Juanita was born Judith Hart in Berkeley, California, and grew up in Oakland. At age 16, she began attending Oakland City College, transferring to San Francisco State University as a junior. She was a member of the Black Student Union. After Huey P. Newton and Bobby Seale recruited at the university, she joined the BPP in 1967 and lived in one of their safe houses on Potrero Hill. while she edited The Black Panther, the Party's newspaper, and worked on the BPP's Free Breakfast for Children program. She received her BA in psychology and MFA in creative writing from San Francisco State.

Juanita taught at San Francisco State University as a Black Psychology and Black Journalism instructor in the first Black Studies program in the United States.

Juanita attended the Community of Writers at Squaw Valley in 1992.

From 1992 to 2007, the San Francisco Mime Troupe, political theater in the parks, toured "Knocked Up" which she co-wrote with Tina Tree Murch. The play, a musical, was a commedia dell'arte: when a young villager becomes pregnant and is refused the morning-after pill, a mysterious comet causes all the males in the village to become pregnant. By play's end, they've come around to approving the RU486, as the morning after pill was called.

In 2012 she attended the Vermont Studio Center and Breadloaf writers' conferences. In 2013, Juanita's poem "Bling" was nominated for a Pushcart Prize. In 2015, her essay "The Gun as Ultimate Performance Poem" was also nominated for a Pushcart Prize. She has written 17 plays that have been performed in the Bay Area, L.A., NYC, Winston-Salem, and Minneapolis.

A distinguished finalist in OSU's Non/Fiction Collection Prize 2016, her collection of essays is the account of the feminist foot soldier. DeFacto Feminism: Essays Straight Outta Oakland (EquiDistance Press, 2016) was a Book-of-the-Month selection in March 2017, at Kirkus Reviews (where it also received a positive review), and at African Americans on the Move Book Club (AAMBC) in December 2016. A lengthy critical review of the collection by poet-musician-activist Chris Stroffolino appears in Ishmael Reed's magazine KONCH in December 2016.

In 2014 and 2015, Juanita's short story collection The High Cost of Freeways was a finalist in the Donna Tartt First Fiction Contest. Her short story "Cabbie" appears in Akashic Press' noir series, Oakland Noir, published in 2017.

Juanita has been a Buddhist since 1980, practicing Nichiren Buddhism with Soka Gakkai International.

Judy Juanita's recent poems appear in New Verse News, an online political poetry blog. She appears also in the 2020 Netflix documentary, Last Chance U: Season 5, LANEY College.

In 2024 she received a Reginald Lockett Lifetime Achievement Award from PEN Oakland.
