= Golden Gate Conference (junior college) =

Junior college athletic conference in Northern California

The Golden Gate Conference was a junior college athletic conference with member schools located in the San Francisco Bay Area, in Northern California. The conference was formed in 1961 and began operation in the fall of 1962. The conference's eight initial members were Chabot College, Contra Costa College, Diablo Valley College, Foothill College, Oakland City College, the City College of San Francisco, San Jose City College, the College of San Mateo. The Golden Gate Conference was originally called the Bay League during its development.

== Year football standings ==
1962 Golden Gate Conference football standings
	Conf.					Overall
Team	W		L		T	W		L		T
Contra Costa $	6	–	0	–	1	8	–	1	–	1
Foothill	5	–	2	–	0	7	–	2	–	0
San Mateo	4	–	2	–	1	6	–	2	–	1
Oakland City	4	–	3	–	0	4	–	4	–	0
San Jose City	3	–	3	–	1	4	–	4	–	1
CC of San Francisco	3	–	4	–	0	4	–	5	–	0
Chabot	1	–	6	–	0	2	–	6	–	1
Diablo Valley	0	–	6	–	1	0	–	7	–	2
$ – Conference champion

1963 Golden Gate Conference football standings
	Conf.					Overall
Team	W		L		T	W		L		T
Contra Costa $	7	–	0	–	0	8	–	0	–	0
Foothill	4	–	2	–	0	5	–	3	–	0
Chabot	4	–	3	–	0	5	–	3	–	1
CC of San Francisco	3	–	3	–	0	3	–	4	–	0
San Jose City	3	–	4	–	0	4	–	5	–	0
Oakland City	2	–	4	–	1	4	–	4	–	1
San Mateo	2	–	4	–	1	3	–	5	–	1
Diablo Valley	1	–	6	–	0	2	–	7	–	0
$ – Conference champion

1964 Golden Gate Conference football standings
	Conf.					Overall
Team	W		L		T	W		L		T
Chabot +	5	–	2	–	0	7	–	2	–	0
Contra Costa +	5	–	2	–	0	6	–	2	–	1
Merritt	4	–	2	–	1	5	–	3	–	1
CC of San Francisco	4	–	2	–	1	5	–	3	–	1
Foothill	4	–	3	–	0	5	–	4	–	0
San Jose City	2	–	5	–	0	2	–	7	–	0
San Mateo	2	–	5	–	0	2	–	7	–	0
Diablo Valley	1	–	6	–	0	2	–	6	–	1
+ – Conference co-champions

1965 Golden Gate Conference football standings
	Conf.					Overall
Team	W		L		T	W		L		T
CC of San Francisco $	6	–	0	–	1	8	–	1	–	1
Foothill	5	–	2	–	0	7	–	3	–	0
San Jose City	5	–	2	–	0	5	–	4	–	0
Chabot	4	–	3	–	0	5	–	4	–	0
Diablo Valley	3	–	3	–	1	5	–	3	–	1
San Mateo	2	–	5	–	0	2	–	7	–	0
Merritt	1	–	6	–	0	2	–	7	–	0
Contra Costa	1	–	6	–	0	2	–	8	–	0
$ – Conference champion

1966 Golden Gate Conference football standings
	Conf.					Overall
Team	W		L		T	W		L		T
CC of San Francisco $	7	–	0	–	0	9	–	1	–	0
Diablo Valley	5	–	2	–	0	6	–	3	–	0
San Mateo	4	–	2	–	1	5	–	3	–	1
Contra Costa	4	–	3	–	0	5	–	4	–	0
Chabot	3	–	4	–	0	5	–	4	–	0
San Jose City	2	–	5	–	0	3	–	6	–	0
Merritt	1	–	5	–	1	1	–	7	–	1
Foothill	1	–	6	–	0	3	–	6	–	0
$ – Conference champion

1967 Golden Gate Conference football standings
	Conf.					Overall
Team	W		L		T	W		L		T
Chabot +^	5	–	1	–	1	6	–	3	–	1
Diablo Valley +	5	–	1	–	1	5	–	3	–	1
CC of San Francisco	5	–	2	–	0	5	–	4	–	0
San Jose City	4	–	3	–	0	5	–	4	–	0
San Mateo	3	–	3	–	1	4	–	4	–	1
Merritt	2	–	5	–	0	3	–	6	–	0
Foothill	1	–	5	–	1	1	–	7	–	1
Contra Costa	1	–	6	–	0	2	–	6	–	0
+ – Conference co-champions; ^ – California state junior college large division playoff participant

1968 Golden Gate Conference football standings
	Conf.					Overall
Team	W		L		T	W		L		T
Diablo Valley $^	6	–	0	–	0	8	–	2	–	0
San Jose City	5	–	1	–	0	6	–	3	–	0
CC of San Francisco	4	–	2	–	0	7	–	2	–	0
Merritt	2	–	4	–	0	4	–	5	–	0
Chabot	2	–	4	–	0	2	–	7	–	0
San Mateo	1	–	4	–	1	1	–	7	–	1
Foothill	0	–	5	–	1	1	–	7	–	1
Laney			–			6	–	3	–	0
$ – Conference champion; ^ – California state junior college large division playoff participant

1969 Golden Gate Conference football standings
	Conf.					Overall
Team	W		L		T	W		L		T
Chabot $^	7	–	0	–	0	9	–	2	–	0
San Mateo	6	–	1	–	0	7	–	2	–	0
Diablo Valley	4	–	2	–	1	5	–	3	–	1
San Jose City	3	–	4	–	0	5	–	4	–	0
Laney	3	–	4	–	0	3	–	6	–	0
Merritt	2	–	5	–	0	3	–	6	–	0
Foothill	1	–	5	–	1	1	–	7	–	1
CC of San Francisco	1	–	6	–	0	2	–	7	–	0
$ – Conference champion; ^ – California state junior college large division playoff participant

1970 Golden Gate Conference football standings
	Conf.					Overall
Team	W		L		T	W		L		T
Chabot $^	6	–	0	–	1	9	–	1	–	1
San Mateo	5	–	1	–	1	?	–	?	–	?
Foothill	4	–	3	–	0	?	–	?	–	?
San Jose City	4	–	3	–	0	?	–	?	–	?
Diablo Valley	3	–	4	–	0	5	–	4	–	0
CC of San Francisco	2	–	5	–	0	?	–	?	–	?
Laney	2	–	5	–	0	?	–	?	–	?
Merritt	1	–	6	–	0	?	–	?	–	?
$ – Conference champion; ^ – California state junior college large division playoff participant Diablo Valley forfeited conference wins over Foothill, Laney, and Merritt.

1971 Golden Gate Conference football standings
	Conf.					Overall
Team	W		L		T	W		L		T
Laney +	6	–	1	–	0	9	–	1	–	0
San Mateo +^	6	–	1	–	0	9	–	2	–	0
Chabot	5	–	2	–	0	7	–	3	–	0
San Jose City	5	–	2	–	0	6	–	4	–	0
Diablo Valley	2	–	5	–	0	4	–	6	–	0
Foothill	2	–	5	–	0	3	–	7	–	0
CC of San Francisco	2	–	5	–	0	2	–	7	–	0
Merritt	0	–	7	–	0	0	–	10	–	0
+ – Conference co-champions; ^ – California state junior college large division playoff participant

1972 Golden Gate Conference football standings
	Conf.					Overall
Team	W		L		T	W		L		T
Chabot $^	7	–	0	–	0	11	–	1	–	0
Foothill	5	–	1	–	1	6	–	3	–	1
Diablo Valley	4	–	3	–	0	7	–	3	–	0
Laney	4	–	3	–	0	5	–	5	–	0
San Mateo	3	–	4	–	0	6	–	4	–	0
San Jose City	3	–	4	–	0	4	–	5	–	0
Merritt	1	–	5	–	1	3	–	5	–	1
CC of San Francisco	0	–	7	–	0	0	–	9	–	0
$ – Conference champion; ^ – California state junior college large division playoff participant

1973 Golden Gate Conference football standings
	Conf.					Overall
Team	W		L		T	W		L		T
San Mateo $^	5	–	0	–	1	8	–	3	–	1
San Jose City	4	–	2	–	0	8	–	2	–	0
Laney	3	–	2	–	1	3	–	5	–	1
Chabot	3	–	3	–	0	6	–	3	–	0
Diablo Valley	3	–	3	–	0	6	–	4	–	0
CC of San Francisco	2	–	4	–	0	4	–	5	–	0
Merritt	0	–	6	–	0	2	–	8	–	0
$ – Conference champion; ^ – California state junior college large division playoff participant

1974 Golden Gate Conference football standings
	Conf.					Overall
Team	W		L		T	W		L		T
San Jose City $^	7	–	1	–	0	10	–	2	–	0
San Mateo	6	–	2	–	0	7	–	3	–	0
Chabot	5	–	2	–	1	6	–	3	–	1
Diablo Valley	4	–	3	–	1	5	–	4	–	1
De Anza	4	–	4	–	0	6	–	4	–	0
Foothill	4	–	4	–	0	4	–	5	–	1
Laney	2	–	6	–	0	3	–	7	–	0
CC of San Francisco	2	–	6	–	0	3	–	7	–	0
West Valley	1	–	7	–	0	1	–	9	–	0
$ – Conference champion; ^ – California state junior college Division I playoff participant

1975 Golden Gate Conference football standings
	Conf.					Overall
Team	W		L		T	W		L		T
Chabot $	7	–	1	–	0	9	–	2	–	0
Diablo Valley	6	–	1	–	1	6	–	3	–	1
San Jose City	5	–	2	–	1	7	–	2	–	1
West Valley	5	–	3	–	0	7	–	3	–	0
San Mateo	3	–	4	–	1	4	–	5	–	1
Foothill	3	–	4	–	1	3	–	6	–	1
De Anza	3	–	5	–	0	4	–	6	–	0
CC of San Francisco	2	–	6	–	0	3	–	7	–	0
Laney	0	–	8	–	0	0	–	10	–	0
$ – Conference champion

1976 Golden Gate Conference football standings
	Conf.					Overall
Team	W		L		T	W		L		T
San Jose City $	7	–	1	–	0	10	–	1	–	0
San Mateo	6	–	2	–	0	8	–	2	–	0
Chabot	5	–	3	–	0	6	–	4	–	0
CC of San Francisco	5	–	3	–	0	6	–	4	–	0
Foothill	4	–	4	–	0	5	–	5	–	0
Diablo Valley	3	–	5	–	0	4	–	5	–	1
West Valley	3	–	5	–	0	4	–	6	–	0
Laney	2	–	4	–	0	4	–	6	–	0
De Anza	1	–	7	–	0	1	–	9	–	0
$ – Conference champion

1977 Golden Gate Conference football standings
	Conf.					Overall
Team	W		L		T	W		L		T
San Mateo +	6	–	2	–	0	7	–	3	–	0
Laney +	6	–	2	–	0	7	–	4	–	0
De Anza	5	–	3	–	0	6	–	4	–	0
Chabot	5	–	3	–	0	5	–	5	–	0
CC of San Francisco	4	–	4	–	0	6	–	4	–	0
Foothill	3	–	4	–	1	4	–	5	–	1
San Jose City	3	–	4	–	1	3	–	6	–	1
Diablo Valley	3	–	5	–	0	3	–	6	–	1
West Valley	0	–	8	–	0	1	–	9	–	0
+ – Conference co-champions

1978 Golden Gate Conference football standings
	Conf.					Overall
Team	W		L		T	W		L		T
De Anza +	7	–	0	–	1	9	–	1	–	1
Chabot +	7	–	0	–	1	8	–	1	–	1
CC of San Francisco	5	–	2	–	1	7	–	2	–	1
Foothill	4	–	3	–	1	5	–	4	–	1
Laney	3	–	5	–	0	4	–	6	–	0
Diablo Valley	2	–	6	–	0	2	–	8	–	0
San Jose City	2	–	6	–	0	2	–	8	–	0
West Valley	2	–	6	–	0	2	–	8	–	0
San Mateo	2	–	6	–	0	2	–	8	–	0
+ – Conference co-champions

1979 Golden Gate Conference football standings
	Conf.					Overall
Team	W		L		T	W		L		T
De Anza $	8	–	0	–	0	11	–	0	–	0
San Jose City	5	–	3	–	0	6	–	4	–	0
Foothill	5	–	3	–	0	5	–	5	–	0
Laney	4	–	4	–	0	6	–	4	–	0
Chabot	4	–	4	–	0	6	–	4	–	0
CC of San Francisco	3	–	5	–	0	5	–	5	–	0
San Mateo	3	–	5	–	0	4	–	6	–	0
West Valley	3	–	5	–	0	3	–	7	–	0
Diablo Valley	1	–	7	–	0	2	–	8	–	0
$ – Conference champion

1980 Golden Gate Conference football standings
	Conf.					Overall
Team	W		L		T	W		L		T
Chabot $	8	–	0	–	0	11	–	1	–	0
Laney	7	–	1	–	0	9	–	1	–	0
Foothill	6	–	2	–	0	7	–	3	–	0
Diablo Valley	4	–	4	–	0	5	–	5	–	0
San Jose City	4	–	4	–	0	5	–	5	–	0
CC of San Francisco	3	–	5	–	0	4	–	6	–	0
De Anza	2	–	6	–	0	2	–	8	–	0
West Valley	2	–	6	–	0	2	–	8	–	0
San Mateo	0	–	8	–	0	1	–	9	–	0
$ – Conference champion

1981 Golden Gate Conference football standings
	Conf.					Overall
Team	W		L		T	W		L		T
San Mateo +	6	–	1	–	0	10	–	1	–	0
Chabot +	6	–	1	–	0	7	–	3	–	1
CC of San Francisco	5	–	2	–	0	7	–	2	–	1
De Anza	3	–	4	–	0	4	–	6	–	0
San Jose City	3	–	4	–	0	4	–	6	–	0
West Valley	3	–	4	–	0	4	–	6	–	0
Laney	1	–	6	–	0	3	–	7	–	0
Foothill	1	–	6	–	0	2	–	8	–	0
+ – Conference co-champions

1982 Golden Gate Conference football standings
	Conf.					Overall
Team	W		L		T	W		L		T
Laney $	7	–	0	–	0	10	–	1	–	0
San Jose City	5	–	2	–	0	7	–	3	–	0
Foothill	4	–	3	–	0	5	–	5	–	0
CC of San Francisco	4	–	3	–	0	5	–	5	–	0
San Mateo	3	–	4	–	0	4	–	6	–	0
Chabot	2	–	5	–	0	5	–	5	–	0
De Anza	2	–	5	–	0	4	–	6	–	0
West Valley	1	–	6	–	0	3	–	7	–	0
$ – Conference champion

1983 Golden Gate Conference football standings
	Conf.					Overall
Team	W		L		T	W		L		T
San Jose City +	6	–	1	–	0	10	–	1	–	0
CC of San Francisco +	6	–	1	–	0	8	–	3	–	0
San Mateo	5	–	2	–	0	8	–	2	–	0
De Anza	5	–	2	–	0	7	–	2	–	1
Foothill	2	–	5	–	0	3	–	7	–	0
West Valley	2	–	5	–	0	3	–	7	–	0
Laney	1	–	6	–	0	3	–	7	–	0
Chabot	1	–	6	–	0	2	–	7	–	0
+ – Conference co-champions

1984 Golden Gate Conference football standings
	Conf.					Overall
Team	W		L		T	W		L		T
San Jose City $	7	–	0	–	1	9	–	1	–	1
San Mateo	7	–	1	–	0	9	–	2	–	0
Laney	5	–	2	–	1	7	–	2	–	1
Diablo Valley	4	–	4	–	0	6	–	4	–	0
Chabot	4	–	4	–	0	5	–	5	–	0
CC of San Francisco	4	–	4	–	0	5	–	5	–	0
Foothill	2	–	6	–	0	2	–	8	–	0
De Anza	1	–	7	–	0	2	–	8	–	0
West Valley	1	–	7	–	0	1	–	9	–	0
$ – Conference champion

1985 Golden Gate Conference football standings
	Conf.					Overall
Team	W		L		T	W		L		T
De Anza +	6	–	2	–	0	9	–	2	–	0
Diablo Valley +	6	–	2	–	0	8	–	3	–	0
San Jose City +	6	–	2	–	0	8	–	2	–	0
San Mateo +	6	–	2	–	0	7	–	3	–	0
Chabot +	6	–	2	–	0	6	–	4	–	0
Laney	3	–	5	–	0	5	–	5	–	0
West Valley	2	–	6	–	0	2	–	8	–	0
CC of San Francisco	1	–	7	–	0	1	–	9	–	0
Foothill	0	–	8	–	0	0	–	10	–	0
+ – Conference co-champions

1986 Golden Gate Conference football standings
	Conf.					Overall
Team	W		L		T	W		L		T
San Jose City +	6	–	0	–	0	11	–	0	–	0
CC of San Francisco	5	–	1	–	0	8	–	2	–	0
Diablo Valley	4	–	2	–	0	5	–	5	–	0
Chabot	2	–	4	–	0	6	–	4	–	0
West Valley	2	–	4	–	0	3	–	7	–	0
San Mateo	1	–	5	–	0	3	–	7	–	0
Laney	1	–	5	–	0	4	–	6	–	0
+ – Conference co-champions

1987 Golden Gate Conference football standings
	Conf.					Overall
Team	W		L		T	W		L		T
San Jose City +	5	–	1	–	0	8	–	3	–	0
San Mateo +	5	–	1	–	0	6	–	4	–	0
Chabot	4	–	2	–	0	5	–	5	–	0
Diablo Valley	3	–	3	–	0	5	–	5	–	0
CC of San Francisco	2	–	4	–	0	5	–	5	–	0
Laney	2	–	4	–	0	4	–	6	–	0
West Valley	0	–	6	–	0	1	–	9	–	0
+ – Conference co-champions

1988 Golden Gate Conference football standings
	Conf.					Overall
Team	W		L		T	W		L		T
Chabot $	6	–	0	–	0	10	–	1	–	0
San Jose City	4	–	1	–	1	5	–	4	–	1
San Mateo	4	–	2	–	0	6	–	4	–	0
Diablo Valley	3	–	3	–	0	5	–	5	–	0
CC of San Francisco	2	–	3	–	1	5	–	5	–	1
Laney	1	–	5	–	0	2	–	9	–	0
West Valley	0	–	6	–	0	2	–	7	–	0
$ – Conference champion

1989 Golden Gate Conference football standings
	Conf.					Overall
Team	W		L		T	W		L		T
Diablo Valley $	6	–	0	–	0	10	–	1	–	0
Chabot	4	–	2	–	0	8	–	2	–	0
San Jose City	4	–	2	–	0	6	–	5	–	0
Laney	4	–	2	–	0	5	–	4	–	0
West Valley	1	–	5	–	0	4	–	6	–	0
San Mateo	1	–	5	–	0	3	–	7	–	0
CC of San Francisco	1	–	5	–	0	2	–	8	–	0
$ – Conference champion

1990 Golden Gate Conference football standings
	Conf.					Overall
Team	W		L		T	W		L		T
CC of San Francisco $	7	–	0	–	0	9	–	2	–	0
Diablo Valley	6	–	1	–	0	9	–	2	–	0
Chabot	5	–	2	–	0	6	–	4	–	0
San Mateo	4	–	3	–	0	6	–	4	–	0
San Jose City	2	–	4	–	0	3	–	7	–	0
West Valley	2	–	4	–	0	3	–	7	–	0
Laney	2	–	5	–	0	2	–	8	–	0
San Joaquin Delta	0	–	7	–	0	2	–	8	–	0
$ – Conference champion

1992 Golden Gate Conference football standings
	Conf.					Overall
Team	W		L		T	W		L		T
CC of San Francisco $	7	–	0	–	0	10	–	1	–	0
Chabot	5	–	2	–	0	7	–	4	–	0
Laney	4	–	3	–	0	7	–	3	–	0
San Jose City	4	–	3	–	0	5	–	5	–	0
San Mateo	4	–	3	–	0	5	–	5	–	0
Diablo Valley	3	–	4	–	0	5	–	4	–	1
San Joaquin Delta	1	–	6	–	0	2	–	7	–	1
West Valley	0	–	7	–	0	0	–	10	–	0
$ – Conference champion

1997 Golden Gate Conference football standings
	Conf.			Overall
Team	W		L	W		L
CC of San Francisco $	5	–	0	11	–	1
Chabot	4	–	1	8	–	3
Gavilan	2	–	3	7	–	4
Foothill	2	–	3	6	–	5
San Jose City	2	–	3	3	–	7
San Mateo	0	–	5	2	–	8
$ – Conference champion

1998 Golden Gate Conference football standings
	Conf.			Overall
Team	W		L	W		L
CC of San Francisco $	5	–	0	10	–	0
Foothill	4	–	1	9	–	1
Chabot	3	–	2	8	–	2
San Mateo	2	–	3	4	–	6
San Jose City	1	–	4	4	–	6
Gavilan	0	–	5	2	–	8
$ – Conference champion

1999 Golden Gate Conference football standings
	Conf.			Overall
Team	W		L	W		L
CC of San Francisco $	5	–	0	10	–	0
Foothill	4	–	1	8	–	2
Chabot	3	–	2	6	–	4
San Mateo	2	–	3	4	–	6
San Jose City	1	–	4	3	–	7
Gavilan	0	–	5	1	–	9
$ – Conference champion

2000 Golden Gate Conference football standings
	Conf.			Overall
Team	W		L	W		L
CC of San Francisco $	5	–	0	12	–	0
Foothill	4	–	1	8	–	3
San Mateo	2	–	3	4	–	6
Cabrillo	2	–	3	3	–	7
Chabot	1	–	4	3	–	7
San Jose City	1	–	4	3	–	7
$ – Conference champion

2001 Golden Gate Conference football standings
	Conf.			Overall
Team	W		L	W		L
CC of San Francisco $	4	–	0	10	–	0
Foothill	3	–	1	7	–	3
Chabot	2	–	2	4	–	6
Cabrillo	1	–	3	3	–	7
San Jose City	0	–	4	4	–	6
$ – Conference champion
