= John Beam =

American football coach (1959–2025)

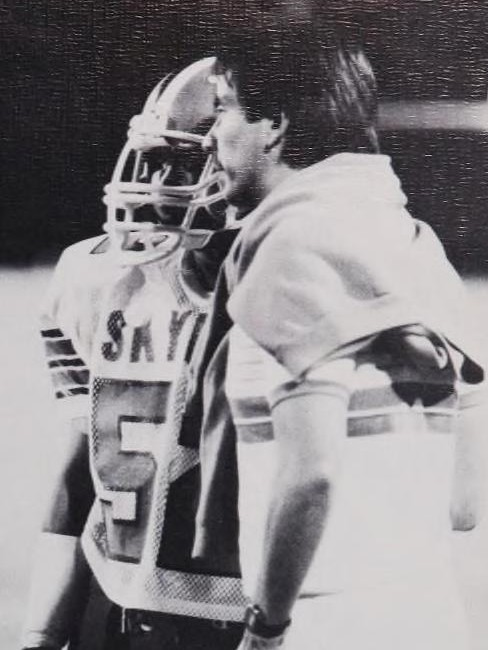
- Beam (right) coaching Skyline in 1986

Biographical details
- Born: January 11, 1959; San Diego, California, U.S.
- Died: November 14, 2025 (aged 66); Oakland, California, U.S.
- Education: Cal State East Bay

Playing career
- 1977–1978: San Diego Mesa
- Position: Tackle

Coaching career (HC unless noted)
- 1979–1980: Serra HS (CA) (OL)
- 1982–1986: Skyline HS (CA) (DC)
- 1987–2003: Skyline HS (CA)
- 2004: Laney (RB)
- 2005–2011: Laney (OC)
- 2012–2024: Laney

Administrative career (AD unless noted)
- 2006–2025: Laney

Head coaching record
- Overall: 80–52 (junior college); 160–33–3 (high school)
- Bowls: 2–3
- Tournaments: 2–2 (CCCAA playoffs)

Accomplishments and honors

Championships
- CCCAA (2018); Golden Gate Conference (2012); National Valley League (2017); National Bay 6 League (2022)

John Edward Beam (January 11, 1959 – November 14, 2025) was an American football coach and faculty athletics director. He served as the head football coach at Laney College in Oakland, California, from 2012 to 2024. Beam starred in the fifth season of the Netflix documentary series Last Chance U, which was released in 2020. Away from the playing field, Beam was a beloved figure in the Oakland area and served as a mentor to thousands of youth. More than 30 of his former student athletes played in the National Football League (NFL).

== Early life and education ==
Beam was born in San Diego, California, on January 11, 1959, to a white American father and Korean mother. His parents met when Beam's father, who was a member of the United States Navy, was stationed in South Korea. Neither of his parents graduated from high school.

Beam went to preschool in Japan before the family moved back to San Diego. He played varsity football at Kearny High School in 1975 and 1976 and at San Diego Mesa College in 1977 and 1978. Following his wife, Cindi, to the San Francisco Bay Area for school, Beam transferred to Cal State East Bay (then known as Cal State Hayward) where he earned a bachelor's degree.

== Career ==
=== High school coaching ===
Beam began his coaching career in 1979 as an offensive line coach at Serra High School in San Diego. In 1982, Beam took the defensive coordinator position at Skyline High School in Oakland. He became the head football coach at Skyline High School in 1987, where he led the Titans to a 160–33–3 record, 15 Oakland Athletic League championships, and 11 Oakland Section titles. The Titans also had four undefeated seasons under Beam's leadership. In 1997, he was named the California State Coach of the Year.

Over 100 students went on to play Division 1 football under Beam's leadership and guidance.

=== Laney College (2004–2025) ===
Beam joined the Laney College football program in 2004 as the running backs coach and became the offensive coordinator in 2005. He became the head coach in 2012 and led the Eagles to a California Community College Athletic Association (CCCAA) championship in 2018. He also was named the CCCAA Coach of the Year in 2018. Throughout Beam's tenure, Laney had .600 winning percentage and participated in four bowl games. Over 90% of Beam's players graduated or transferred to four-year schools, including several who played in the NFL.

In 2020, Laney College was featured in the Netflix series Last Chance U, which followed the 2019 football season.

Beam retired from coaching in 2024 but stayed on as the athletics director.

== Personal life ==
Beam was a notable figure in the Oakland area, known for his bushy mustache and for mentoring local youth. He typically ended speeches with his trademark sign off, "Two claps, ready, ready." Beam was inducted into the Kearny High School athletics hall of fame.

Beam met his wife, Cynthia "Cindi" Rivera, when she was a student at University of California, San Diego. The couple had two daughters, Monica and Sonjha.

=== Death ===
Beam was shot at Laney College on November 13, 2025. Authorities reviewed surveillance footage to determine the circumstances of the shooting. A suspect was arrested at the San Leandro Bay Area Rapid Transit station by the Oakland Police Department the next day. Beam died from the gunshot wound to the head on the same day as the arrest. The day before he was shot, Beam had expressed concerns about public safety on the campus of Laney College, and specifically the field house, after the Peralta Community College District in 2020 terminated its contract with the Alameda County Sheriff's Office, which provided armed deputies to protect the school, and replaced them with six unarmed private contractors. In April 2026, the suspect, identified as Cedric Irving Jr., was deemed unfit to stand trial for Beam's killing.

== Head coaching record ==
=== Junior college ===
Year	Team	Overall	Conference	Standing	Bowl/playoffs	CCCAA^{#}
Laney Eagles (Golden Gate Conference) (2012–2013)
2012	Laney	5–6	3–1	T–1st	L East Bay Bowl	14
2013	Laney	8–3	3–1	2nd	W Bay Bowl	9
2014	Laney	6–5	4–1	T–1st	L Bulldog Bowl	10
Laney Eagles (National Valley League) (2015–2017)
2015	Laney	4–6	1–4	5th		
2016	Laney	9–2	4–1	2nd	W San Francisco Community College Bowl	
2017	Laney	9–2	5–0	1st	L NCFC semifinal	6
Laney Eagles (National Bay 6 League) (2018–2024)
2018	Laney	11–2	4–1	2nd	W CCCAA championship	
2019	Laney	6–5	4–1	2nd		19
2020–21	No team—COVID-19					
2021	Laney	6–5	2–3	4th		19
2022	Laney	8–3	4–1	T–1st	L NCFC semifinal	5
2023	Laney	4–6	3–2	3rd		
2024	Laney	4–7	1–4	5th		
Laney:		80–52	38–20			
Total:		80–52				
National championship Conference title Conference division title or championship game berth

== Legacy ==
Many people in the Oakland community considered Beam to be a mentor and, in some cases, a father figure. On December 13, 2025, Laney College hosted a memorial walk from the college Bistro to the campus football stadium meant to "reflect the journey that Beam traveled with generations of students during his time at Laney College." Hundreds of people attended including Oakland mayor Barbara Lee and several former students.
