= College of Alameda =

Community college in Alameda, California, US

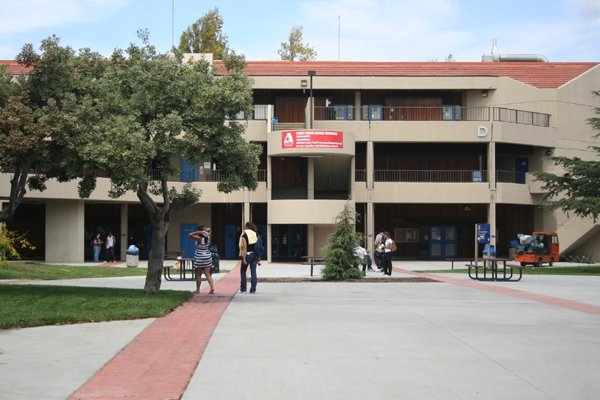
- Type: Public community college
- Established: 1968; 58 years ago
- Parent institution: California Community Colleges and Peralta Community College District
- Chancellor: Tammeil Gilkerson
- President: Melanie Dixon
- Students: 6,600
- Location: Alameda, California, United States; 37.7822°N 122.2793°W
- Campus: Suburban
- Colors: Blue and White
- Nickname: Cougars
- Mascot: Cool E. Cougar
- Website: alameda.edu

College of Alameda is a public community college in Alameda, California. It is part of the Peralta Community College District and was opened in 1968. Since 1970 the college has held classes on a 62-acre campus at the intersection of Webster Street and Ralph Appezzato Memorial Parkway in Alameda.

== Academics ==
College of Alameda offers its courses on the semester calendar, as do the other three colleges of the Peralta Community College District. The college offers basic skills courses in English and Math, as well as individualized labs and tutoring. English as a Second Language courses provide second language learners with proficiency in English through practice in writing, speaking, listening and reading at various levels. Associate in Arts (AA) or Associate in Science (AS) degrees may be earned in many areas of liberal arts and science, with most credits earned transferable to the University of California, California State colleges and universities, and to other public and private four-year colleges and universities.

Student demographics as of Fall 2023
Race and ethnicity	Total
Hispanic	30%
Asian	21%
African American	19%
White	17%
Multiracial	7%
Filipino	3%
Unknown	3%

=== Accreditation ===
College of Alameda is accredited by the Accrediting Commission for Community and Junior Colleges (ACCJC). The college first was accredited in 1973. Individual College of Alameda occupational programs are accredited or certified by the American Dental Association (ADA), Council on Dental Education for Dental Assistants, the Federal Aviation Administration (FAA), and the National Institute for Automotive Service Excellence (ASE).

== Campus ==
College of Alameda's first classes were held in 1968 in temporary facilities at Historic Alameda High School on Central Avenue in downtown Alameda. Its present 59-acre campus, located at the intersection of Webster Street and Ralph Appezzato Memorial Parkway in Alameda, opened in June 1970. With its buildings surrounding a central courtyard, the campus is designed to encourage the interaction between students, faculty and staff essential to an effective learning environment. The campus is accessible by auto or AC Transit bus through the Webster Street Tube from downtown Oakland.

The college's aviation maintenance programs are located on a 2.5-acre (10,000 m^{2}) site on Harbor Bay Parkway, adjacent to Oakland International Airport's North Field.

== Student support ==
The college offers a variety of services to students to support their academic experience, some of which are:

=== Alameda One-Stop Career Center ===
The Alameda One-Stop Career Center is a collaboration between the California Employment Development Department and the College of Alameda. Located on the College of Alameda campus, the One-Stop provides a variety of free job seeker and employer services, including vocational counseling, a resource library, job fairs, onsite recruitment, and resume writing and job search strategies workshops.

=== Assessment and tutoring ===
The college's Assessment Center helps students choose classes to match their skill levels in English, writing and reading, mathematics, and English as a second language. Students receive course recommendations based on the assessment test results, and then meet with a counselor to choose the classes that are most appropriate. Free group or individual tutoring is provided to all students in most subjects taught at the college.

=== Children's Center ===
The campus Children's Center serves children of students, staff, and community members. The center is open from 7:45 a.m. to 5:15 p.m. during the fall and spring semesters. It serves children between three and five years of age, on a sliding fee scale.

=== Concurrent enrollment ===
The Transfer Center provides a variety of services to assist students interested in transferring to four-year colleges and universities. Through the Transfer Center, College of Alameda students have the opportunity to enroll concurrently in one class per semester/quarter at the University of California, Berkeley; California State University, East Bay; Mills College; Holy Names College; or John F. Kennedy University.

High school students are able to enroll concurrently as special part-time students at the college and earn college credits while still in high school. This is arranged through the student's high school principal.

=== EasyPass ===
College of Alameda students enrolled in nine (9) or more semester units are eligible to receive an AC Transit EasyPass. The program provides a semester long, unlimited rides Clipper card for a deep discount to students at the Peralta Colleges. COA is serviced by four bus lines, including one Transbay route.

=== Extended Opportunity Programs & Services (EOPS) ===
College of Alameda offers an Extended Opportunity Programs and Services program for students who have educational, economic, social, cultural, or language problems that interfere with their educational careers. Supportive services provided to EOPS students include professional counseling and peer advising, priority registration, tutorial services, career and academic guidance, financial and book purchase assistance, and transfer assistance and fee waivers for CSU and University of California.

=== Programs and Services for Students with Disabilities (DSPS) ===
Alameda College's DSPS program provides educational and vocational support services for students with disabilities who are enrolled in classes at College of Alameda. Programs focus on learning-skills assessment, advising and training; facilitation of computer access for students with special needs; use of computers as a tool for improving cognitive skills of students with brain injuries; and training in skills necessary to seek and maintain employment.

=== Student activities ===
The Associated Students of College of Alameda (ASCOA) is the student government organization active on campus. There are also a number of student clubs which change year to year depending on current student interest. Very active clubs currently include "Latinos Unidos" and the Psychology Club.

== Alameda Science & Technology Institute (ASTI) ==
Alameda Science and Technology Institute (ASTI) is a public high school in the Alameda Unified School District (AUSD), located on the College of Alameda campus. The high school was founded in 2004 through a partnership between AUSD and the College of Alameda and funded by a grant from the Bill and Melinda Gates foundation. As an Early College High School, ASTI provides students the opportunity to enroll as full-time community college students during their 11th and 12th grade years. The school is based on the belief that all students deserve and are entitled to a college education and that all students are capable of succeeding at a high academic level. The student body is diverse and the school actively seeks out students who are highly motivated but traditionally underrepresented in the areas of socioeconomic level, home language, first generation college goers and ethnicity.

== Athletics ==
The College of Alameda is a member of the Bay Valley Conference of the California Community College Athletic Association. The intercollegiate athletic program at the college provides students the opportunity to participate in men's basketball and women's volleyball. Students enrolled at College of Alameda may participate in athletic programs at other colleges in the Peralta Community College District if a particular sport is not offered at CoA.

== See also ==
- California Community Colleges System
- Peralta Community College District
- Berkeley City College
- Laney College
- Merritt College
