= Berkeley City College =

Public community college in Berkeley, California, US

- Former names: Berkeley Learning Pavilion; Peralta College for Non-Traditional Study; Vista Community College
- Motto: Transforming Lives
- Type: Public community college
- Established: 1974; 52 years ago
- Parent institution: California Community Colleges and Peralta Community College District
- Chancellor: Tammeil Gilkerson
- President: Denise Richardson
- Academic staff: 172
- Students: 6,457
- Location: Berkeley, California, United States; 37.869826°N 122.269698°W
- Campus: Urban
- Colors
- Website: berkeleycitycollege.edu

Berkeley City College (BCC, formerly Vista Community College) is a public community college in Berkeley, California. It is part of the California Community Colleges System and the Peralta Community College District. Berkeley City College is accredited by the Accrediting Commission for Community and Junior Colleges.

== History ==
Berkeley City College was founded in 1974 as the Berkeley Learning Pavilion, which was renamed the Peralta College for Non-Traditional Study the same year, as a Peralta community college to serve the northern cities of Alameda County: Albany, Berkeley, and Emeryville. It received initial accreditation through the ACCJC in 1977 and in 1978 it was renamed Vista Community College. By 1981, the number of locations with classes offered exceeded 200. The same year, it received full accreditation from ACCJC. Between 1994 and 1996, the college attempted to deannex itself from the Peralta Community College District, but in exchange for dropping the deannexation effort, the Peralta District built a permanent building for the college in 2006. (Before that, classes were offered in many locations throughout the East Bay including UC Berkeley, West Berkeley YMCA, Berkeley High School, the North Berkeley Community Center, St. Mary Magdalene School, the Summit Educational Center, and the Oakland Army Base.) In June 2006, the name was changed to Berkeley City College when it moved into its first and current building, a six-story, 165,000 square foot campus designed to accommodate 7,800 students.

== Academics ==
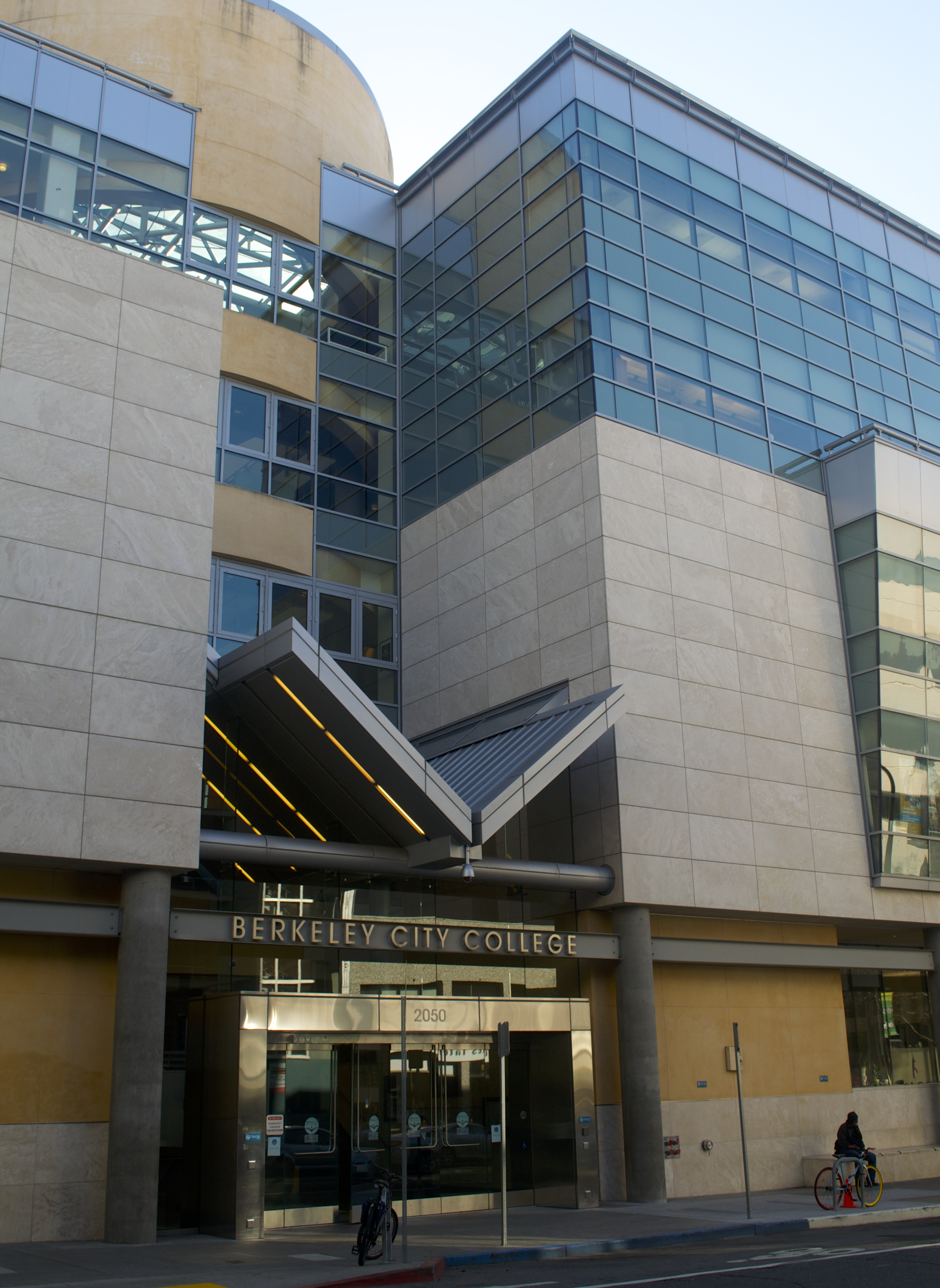

The college maintains a strong and unique community college-university collaboration with the University of California at Berkeley. The college had the fifth highest transfer rate to UC Berkeley in California in academic year 2004–05 and remains in the top five as of 2011.

Berkeley City College structures its transfer courses into guaranteed afternoon, evening and Saturday schedules so that students can complete University of California and California State University transfer requirements, even if they work full-time.

As part of a CalWORKs collaborative, the college has developed training programs for those affected by welfare reform legislation. The college hosts the Center for International Trade Development which provides counseling and international economic development services to local small businesses.

== Student Life ==
Student demographics as of Fall 2023
Race and ethnicity	Total
Hispanic	31%
White	21%
African American	17%
Asian	17%
Multiracial	8%
Unknown	4%
Filipino	2%

== See also ==
- College of Alameda
- Laney College, a community college located in Oakland
- Merritt College, a community college located in Oakland
- California Community Colleges system
- City College of San Francisco, a community college located in San Francisco
