= Last Chance U =

Documentary series about American football

- Genre: Documentary; sports film
- Directed by: Greg Whiteley; Adam Ridley; Luke Lorentzen
- Music by: Yuri Tománek; Joseph Minadeo
- Original language: English
- No. of seasons: 5
- No. of episodes: 38

Production
- Producers: Joe Labracio; Adam Leibowitz; Dawn Ostroff; Adam Ridley; Lucas Smith; James D. Stern; Greg Whiteley
- Production locations: Scooba, Mississippi (seasons 1–2); Independence, Kansas (seasons 3–4); Oakland, California (season 5)
- Running time: 52–76 minutes
- Production companies: Boardwalk Pictures; Condé Nast Entertainment; Endgame Entertainment; One Potato Productions

Original release
- Network: Netflix
- Release: July 29, 2016 – July 28, 2020

Last Chance U is an American documentary television series that is produced by and premiered on Netflix. The six-episode first season explores the football program at East Mississippi Community College, which features several collegiate athletes that have had trouble in their lives and struggled with finding structure. The players are then required to perform at the junior college (JUCO) level, under the stewardship of coach Buddy Stephens, in order to prove themselves and return to Division I.

The series' second season returned to Mississippi, but transitioned to Independence Community College in Kansas for the show's third season, which premiered on July 21, 2018. This was followed by a return to Independence for the fourth season; it debuted on July 19, 2019. The final season took place at Laney College in Oakland, California and premiered on July 28, 2020. In 2020, it was announced that a scripted drama based on the first two seasons would be produced by and star Courteney Cox.

== Synopsis ==
The first two seasons focus on all aspects of the football program at East Mississippi Community College, one of the most successful JUCO programs in the country. Major themes include the academic struggles of the players – some of whom have come from severely disadvantaged backgrounds. This is set against an overall redemption and coming-of-age “last chance” theme for the group of men struggling to find their place. Team academic advisor Brittany Wagner is featured prominently as she is tasked with getting all team members to graduate on time. Head coach Buddy Stephens' struggles with controlling his temper is also a major theme, which is often juxtaposed with his devout Christian faith that he attempts to impart on the team.

=== Season 1 ===
The crew followed the EMCC Lions during their 2015 season as they attempted to capture their fourth JUCO national title. While the team appeared dominant for much of the year, their season was derailed after a brawl broke out during their game with Mississippi Delta. EMCC was disqualified from the state playoffs and a potential berth to the national championship game.

Ranking: NJCAA released prior to game.

EMCC Lions 2015 season results
Date	Opponent	Rank	Site	Result
August 27	Southwest Mississippi	No. 1	Sullivan–Windham Field; Scooba, MS	W 69–20
September 3	at No. 4 Copiah–Lincoln	No. 1	Stone Stadium; Wesson, MS	L 31–24
September 10	Coahoma	No. 7	Sullivan–Windham Field; Scooba, MS	W 69–0
September 17	at Northeast Mississippi	No. 7	Tiger Stadium; Booneville, MS	W 56–7
September 26	Itawamba	No. 6	Sullivan–Windham Field; Scooba, MS	W 48–24
October 1	at Jones County	No. 7	Bobcat Stadium/Sim Cooley Field; Ellisville, MS	W 49–7
October 8	at Holmes	No. 6	Ras Branch Field; Goodman, MS	W 44–28
October 15	No. 4 Northwest Mississippi	No. 8	Sullivan–Windham Field; Scooba, MS	W 49–16
October 22	at Mississippi Delta	No. 3	Jim Randall Field; Moorhead, MS	W 48–0
Rankings from Coaches' Poll released prior to the game

=== Season 2 ===
Netflix returned to Scooba to follow their 2016 season. Once again holding national championship aspirations, the team faced a major hurdle in that only 32 of their players were eligible for their opening game with Jones County Junior College due to suspensions related to the previous season's brawl. EMCC lost that game, 27–25, their first season-opening loss since 2010. The Lions would go on to win the rest of their games, but were left out of the national championship game when they finished the season ranked No. 3 in the polls.

Ranking: NJCAA released prior to game.

EMCC Lions 2016 season results
Date	Opponent	Rank	Site	Result
September 1	at Jones County	No. 1	Bobcat Stadium/Sim Cooley Field; Ellisville, MS	L 25–27
September 8	at No. 17 Mississippi Gulf Coast	No. 12	A. L. May Memorial Stadium; Perkinston, MS	W 45–7
September 15	Northeast Mississippi	No. 14	Sullivan–Windham Field; Scooba, MS	W 54–10
September 22	at No. 15 Itawamba	No. 11	Eaton Field; Fulton, MS	W 44–42
September 29	Mississippi Delta	No. 9	Sullivan–Windham Field; Scooba, MS	W 73–7
October 6	at No. 16 Holmes	No. 5	Ras Branch Field; Goodman, MS	W 63–49
October 15	No. 1 Northwest Mississippi	No. 4	Sullivan–Windham Field; Scooba, MS	W 51–32
October 20	at Coahoma	No. 3	James E. Miller Stadium; Clarksdale, MS	W 42–0
October 27	Hinds	No. 3	Sullivan–Windham Field; Scooba, MS	W 42–0
November 5	Mississippi Gulf Coast	No. 3	Sullivan–Windham Field; Scooba, MS (MACJC Semifinal)	W 27–24
November 12	No. 4 Northwest Mississippi	No. 3	Sullivan–Windham Field; Scooba, MS (MACJC Championship)	W 38–30
December 4	vs. No. 13 Kilgore	No. 3	A. L. May Memorial Stadium; Perkinston, MS (Mississippi Bowl)	W 27–17
Rankings from Coaches' Poll released prior to the game

=== Season 3 ===
Despite being invited back to EMCC for a third season, producers decided to move the show to Independence Community College of Kansas. The new location is different in that ICC has historically had much lower expectations than EMCC; in 2016, it ended the season 5–4, its first winning season in ten years. The ICC Pirates had a very successful recruiting campaign for the 2017 season, landing many acclaimed players who began at NCAA Division I schools.

Ranking: NJCAA released prior to game.

ICC Pirates 2017 season results
Date	Opponent	Rank	Site	Result
August 26	No. 12 Iowa Western*	No. 17	Emmot Field; Independence, KS	L 21–70
September 2	at Fort Scott		Frary Field; Fort Scott, KS	W 30–16
September 9	No. 3 Garden City		Emmot Field; Independence, KS	W 27–23
September 23	at Iowa Central*	No. 13	Manson High School Field; Manson, IA	W 47–7
September 30	at Dodge City	No. 12	Memorial Stadium; Dodge City, KS	W 32–28
October 7	Ellsworth*	No. 7	Emmot Field; Independence, KS	W 44–38 ^{3OT}
October 15	at Highland	No. 6	Kessinger Field at Scottie Stadium Center; Highland, KS	W 9–6
October 28	No. 16 Hutchinson	No. 6	Emmot Field; Independence, KS	W 24–19
November 4	at No. 10 Butler	No. 5	BG Products Veterans Sports Complex; El Dorado, KS	L 27–31
November 11	Coffeyville	No. 9	Emmot Field; Independence, KS	W 27–22
December 4	at No. 4 Northeastern Oklahoma A&M*	No. 7	Red Robertson Field; Miami, OK (Midwest Bowl Classic)	W 30–20
*Non-conference game; Rankings from Coaches' Poll released prior to the game

=== Season 4 ===
The fourth season continues in Independence, where the team fails to live up to high preseason expectations, finishing 2–8. After the season, Coach Brown is forced to resign for insensitive remarks. The season received the 2020 Emmy Award for Outstanding Serialized Sports Documentary.

Ranking: NJCAA released prior to game.

ICC Pirates 2018 season results
Date	Opponent	Rank	Site	Result
August 23	at Dodge City	No. 6	Memorial Stadium; Dodge City, KS	W 38–20
September 1	Hutchinson	No. 6	Emmot Field; Independence, KS	L 27–37
September 15	No. 7 Garden City	No. 13	Emmot Field; Independence, KS	L 21–28
September 22	Fort Scott		Emmot Field; Independence, KS	L 0–33
October 6	at No. 19 Butler		BG Products Veterans Sports Complex; El Dorado, KS	L 14–17
October 13	at No. 3 Iowa Western*		Titan Stadium; Council Bluffs, IA	L 21–44
October 20	Coffeyville		Emmot Field; Independence, KS	L 16–21
October 27	Iowa Central*		Emmot Field; Independence, KS	L 19–20
November 3	at No. 19 Highland		Porter Family Stadium; Highland, KS	L 21–24
November 10	Ellsworth*		Emmot Field; Independence, KS	W 21–15 ^{OT}
*Non-conference game; Rankings from Coaches' Poll released prior to the game

=== Season 5 ===
The fifth season takes place in Oakland, California at Laney College alongside football head coach John Beam. It premiered in July 2020.

Laney Eagles 2019 season results
Date	Opponent	Rank	Site	Result
September 6	No. 10 Modesto*	No. 1	Laney Eagle Stadium; Oakland, CA	L 20–33
September 14	at No. 6 American River*	No. 8	Beaver Stadium; North Highlands, CA	L 10–15
September 20	Feather River*	No. 14	Laney Eagle Stadium; Oakland, CA (Alumni Night)	W 60–14
September 28	at West Hills*	No. 15	Memorial Stadium; Coalinga, CA	W 26–16
October 5	at No. 11 Butte*	No. 17	Harrison Stadium; Oroville, CA	L 7–24
October 18	No. 5 City College of San Francisco	No. 20	Laney Eagle Stadium; Oakland, CA	W 13–10
October 26	No. 1 College of San Mateo	No. 16	Laney Eagle Stadium; Oakland, CA	L 14–29
November 2	Santa Rosa	No. 20	Laney Eagle Stadium; Oakland, CA	W 41–35
November 8	Diablo Valley	No. 16	Laney Eagle Stadium; Oakland, CA (Sophomore Night)	W 39–0
November 16	at No. 23 Chabot	No. 15	Gladiator Stadium; Hayward, CA	W 41–21
November 23	No. 18 Sierra*	No. 15	Laney Eagle Stadium; Oakland, CA (NorCal Grizzly Bowl)	L 14–21
*Non-conference game; Rankings from Coaches' Poll released prior to the game

== Episodes ==
=== Series overview ===
Series overview
Season	Episodes	Originally released
1	6	July 29, 2016
2	8	July 21, 2017
3	8	July 20, 2018
4	8	July 19, 2019
5	8	July 28, 2020

=== Season 1 (2016) ===
No. overall	No. in season	Title	Original release date
1	1	"Last Chance U"	July 29, 2016
Desperate for an opportunity at a major school, the players at East Mississippi Community College prepare for a season that's crucial to their future.
2	2	"Most Dangerous Game"	July 29, 2016
The starting quarterback battle rages on. Brittany worries about the players' academic progress. EMCC's winning streak is threatened by a rival.
3	3	"Plan B"	July 29, 2016
The coaches and players deal with unfamiliar adversity. DJ and others struggle with school. Ollie faces tough times and seeks comfort back home.
4	4	"Homecoming"	July 29, 2016
Players, other students and the community prepare for homecoming weekend. Tensions rise at the homecoming game, prompting Buddy to lose his cool.
5	5	"Blood Makes the Grass Grow"	July 29, 2016
DJ faces choices that will make or break his future. John hopes for a chance to impress Auburn coaches. Bad blood builds in the regular-season finale.
6	6	"It Is What It Is"	July 29, 2016
The regular season comes to an explosive end, and the team must deal with the fallout from their actions. The players prepare for life after EMCC.

=== Season 2 (2017) ===
No. overall	No. in season	Title	Original release date
7	1	"Half a Team"	July 21, 2017
Buddy makes changes in response to the publicity the show brought to the EMCC program. The Lions are forced to play short-handed in the season opener.
8	2	"Football Saved My Life"	July 21, 2017
De'Andre gears up for his first game since he was kicked out of Florida State. Isaiah and his brother open up about their difficult childhood.
9	3	"Can't Make the Club in the Tub"	July 21, 2017
Brittany and Davern try to motivate Kam on and off the field. Isaiah's health concerns continue into a rivalry game against Itawamba.
10	4	"Ain't It a Sin"	July 21, 2017
Faith takes center stage as Buddy, Dakota and others explore the role of religion in their football journey. A much-awaited rematch approaches.
11	5	"For My Momma"	July 21, 2017
As EMCC prepares for the No. 1 team in the country, defensive linemen Chauncey, Kam and Tim continue their battle to atone for their past actions.
12	6	"The Curse"	July 21, 2017
EMCC hopes to maintain its focus against winless Coahoma, a program trying to overcome a deficiency in talent, facilities and support.
13	7	"Bigger and Better Things"	July 21, 2017
As the state playoffs loom, tensions rise between several players and the coaches. Brittany ponders her future at EMCC.
14	8	"Last Man Standing"	July 21, 2017
It's crunch time as the players take finals and weigh scholarship offers while still holding aspirations of winning a national championship at EMCC.

=== Season 3 (2018) ===
No. overall	No. in season	Title	Original release date
15	1	"We Expect"	July 20, 2018
After decades of losing, Independence Community College looks to brash coach Jason Brown to develop a winning culture and recruit talented athletes.
16	2	"Humble Your Pie"	July 20, 2018
After the rough season opener, Coach Brown questions his D1 transfers. Malik and Carlos face tough love as they fight to meet expectations.
17	3	"Jimmys and Joes"	July 20, 2018
Bad blood with his old boss fuels Brown's fire as the newly confident Pirates welcome defending national champion Garden City to Independence.
18	4	"Get Outta Dodge"	July 20, 2018
Despite ICC's winning streak, tensions start to boil over as Brown gets fed up with his players and coaches before and during a game in Dodge City.
19	5	"Out of State"	July 20, 2018
Brown and his players open up about their upbringings and how their relationships with family – positive and negative – shaped who they are today.
20	6	"Neewollah"	July 20, 2018
The team prepares to play during the town's big annual festival. Bobby struggles to overcome frustration. An ICC student writes a song for the team.
21	7	"Abracadabra"	July 20, 2018
As the Pirates get ready for a shot at a conference title, recruiters from four-year schools visit and players scramble to get their grades in order.
22	8	"Dust in The Wind"	July 20, 2018
As a game against rival Coffeyville caps off the regular season, the ICC players and coaches reflect on the season and weigh their next moves.

=== Season 4 (2019) ===
No. overall	No. in season	Title	Original release date
23	1	"Dream U"	July 19, 2019
Jason Brown copes with his celebrity status. Bobby Bruce tries to rebound from bad decisions. Brown considers bringing back a polarizing player.
24	2	"The Eye in the Sky"	July 19, 2019
Bobby gets close with Kailon, who tries to keep Bobby on the right path. Assistant coach Jason Martin talks about moving his family into a dorm room.
25	3	"Home on the Range"	July 19, 2019
The town of Independence gets ready for the highly anticipated home opener. Visits with Chance’s and Kailon’s families shed light on their upbringings.
26	4	"Garden City"	July 19, 2019
Hard feelings from last year rise to the surface in a rematch between ICC and Garden City, as coaches Jason Brown and Jeff Sims butt heads yet again.
27	5	"The Hangover"	July 19, 2019
Jay’s injuries cause him frustration. Malik tries to make the most of his opportunities. Tensions run high after a game against Fort Scott.
28	6	"S Show"	July 19, 2019
As players and coaches start to prioritize themselves over the team, Brown tries to regain control – but a sideline outburst proves costly.
29	7	"Famous Forever"	July 19, 2019
Locals grow restless over the team's performance amid budget cuts at ICC. A home game during the "Neewollah" festival could help unite the town.
30	8	"Hustlers Survive"	July 19, 2019
The season finale presents a chance to end the season on a positive note. Markiese makes a big mistake, and Brown faces criticism over a text message.

=== Season 5 (2020) ===
No. overall	No. in season	Title	Original release date
31	1	"The Town"	July 28, 2020
Life is demanding for players at Oakland's Laney College, where they must pay for their own housing and expenses while pursuing a future in football.
32	2	"QB4"	July 28, 2020
After 40 years, coach John Beam's legacy in Oakland is unmatched. Injuries lead to an unorthodox solution at QB as Laney looks to get back on track.
33	3	"Cast-Offs"	July 28, 2020
Dior's strained relationship with his father affects his play and his health. Nu'u balances school, football and childcare while his wife works.
34	4	"Greyhaven"	July 28, 2020
RJ lives for football, but is haunted by an infamous family history. Beam's old school ways don't always connect with the younger generation.
35	5	"The City"	July 28, 2020
Rejzohn discusses a painful memory, then suffers a physical setback. Despite recent success, Laney still feels disrespected by a rival in San Francisco.
36	6	"Ā, upane! ka upane!"	July 28, 2020
As Dior looks for a way out of California, Beam questions if Nu'u could commit to moving his family away from Oakland. RJ's frustrations mount.
37	7	"New Oakland"	July 28, 2020
Gentrification in Oakland brings some positive changes, but pushes longtime residents out of the city. The Eagles begin a late push for a playoff bid.
38	8	"Football might be over for you"	July 28, 2020
As the season winds down, the graduating players plan their next moves while Beam pledges to make changes and build an even better team next year.

== Reception ==
The series was given a positive review by SB Nation's Jason Kirk, who summed it up as a "carefully crafted drama with personalities to care about." Critical aggregator website Metacritic awarded the series a score of 79, indicating "generally favorable reviews".

== Featured staff ==
=== EMCC ===
- Buddy Stephens (head coach)
- Brittany Wagner (academic advisor)
- Marcus Wood (offensive coordinator)
- Davern Williams (defensive line coach)
- Ed Holly (defensive coordinator, season 2)
- Clint Trickett (quarterbacks coach)
- Cade Wilkerson (running backs coach)
- Jordan Lesley (defensive coordinator, season 1)

=== ICC ===
- Jason Brown (head coach)
- Jason Martin (defensive coordinator, secondary coach)
- Kiyoshi Harris (offensive coordinator, offensive line coach)
- Frank Diaz (quarterback coach)
- Raechal Martin (head athletic trainer)
- Tammy Geldenhuys (athletic director)
- Latonya Pinkard (English teacher, associate professor)
- Mark Harris (Sociology Professor)
- Heather Mydosh (English teacher)
- Daniel Barwick (president)
- Jeff Carpenter (voice of the Pirates)

=== Laney ===
- John Beam (head coach, athletic director)
- Josh Ramos (defensive coordinator, assistant head coach)
- Jeff Haagenson (offensive coordinator)
- Kevin Evans (offensive line coach)
- Bryan Coughlan (defensive line coach)
- Vince Bordelon (outside linebackers coach/pass rush specialist) (Uncredited)
- Rob Crowley (quarterback coach)
- Adam Robinson (wide receivers coach)
- Derrick Gardner (cornerbacks coach)
- Rick Becker (athletic trainer)

== Players ==
2015 EMCC Lions players (season 1)
Player	Position	Transfer in	Transfer out	Notes
John Franklin III	QB	Florida State	Auburn	Franklin was officially added to the Auburn football roster in 2016 and played sparingly in his first season on The Plains, recording one passing touchdown and two rushing touchdowns while backing up starter Sean White. In August 2017, he transferred to Florida Atlantic University as a wide receiver. After going undrafted in the 2018 NFL draft, Franklin signed with the Chicago Bears as a defensive back. He spent the 2018 season on the Bears' practice squad, and was finally waived in August 2019. In November, he was signed to the Tampa Bay Buccaneers practice squad and was promoted to the active roster a month later, making his NFL debut in a Week 17 loss to the Atlanta Falcons.
Wyatt Roberts	QB	—	Mississippi State	On the show, Roberts mentions that if big offers don't come in, he's going to be content to move on to Mississippi State, where he would attend as a student and not walk-on to the football team. True to his word, Roberts did not walk-on to Mississippi State. However, after a quarterback transferred out of the team, Head Coach Dan Mullen approached Wyatt, who then walked-on to the team.
Dacorius (D. J.) Law	RB	—	UAB	Law was officially admitted to UAB after final clearance was provided on August 30, 2016. Struggling with academics and an injured knee, he did not play for UAB and left the team in May 2017.
Allenzae Staggers	WR	—	Southern Miss	Staggers joined the Southern Miss football team after the culmination of his Junior year at EMCC. In his first season with the Golden Eagles, he led the team in receiving yards with 1165, and added 7 touchdowns, and was placed on the Biletnikoff Watch List He also had a team record 292 receiving yards in a single game. After the 2018 season Staggers was invited to the Washington Redskins' minicamp. He was waived on August 27.
Ronald Ollie	DT	—	Nicholls State	He played one year at Nicholls State and had 41 tackles, two sacks, and a touchdown. He then left, saying he wants to play at a higher level, but returned in early 2018. Ollie was invited to work out for the New Orleans Saints in preparation for the 2019 NFL season. Although undrafted, Ollie was invited for the Oakland Raiders rookie minicamp and signed with the team shortly after. He was cut during the pre-season. He was on the roster for the Toronto Argonauts of the Canadian Football League for the 2020 season, before the 2020 CFL season was cancelled due to the COVID-19 pandemic in Canada. Ollie was cut prior to the 2021 Toronto Argonauts season.
Marcel Andry	DT	—	Nicholls State	Andry played 10 games in his first season with the Colonels and had 17 tackles. Played all twelve games in his senior season while starting one. After running out of eligibility, Andry stayed at Nicholls State as a graduate assistant and later was promoted to defensive line coach. Andry would stay at Nicholls as a defensive line coach for 3 years before joining Holmes CC in 2021, reuniting him with EMCC coach Marcus Woods.
Gary McCrae	LB	—	Louisville	McCrae only appeared in two games at Louisville (against Charlotte and N.C. State), and did not register any stats. It wasn't much better for him in 2017, as he registered four tackles in limited playing time – most of it on special teams. He played two games in 2018 before injuring his shoulder against Indiana State, missing the rest of the season. He is listed as a grad student on Louisville's 2019 roster.
James Davis	OL	—	UAB	
Isaiah Wright	RB	—	West Georgia	Signed by Auburn in 2016, but never attended. Committed to West Georgia in 2017 and attended spring training but never played for them, and in August 2017 it was announced that he was leaving the team. On September 13, 2017, Wright was charged with criminal homicide connected to a fatal stabbing in Tennessee in July.
C. J. Reavis	S	Virginia Tech	Marshall	After finishing his college career at Marshall, Reavis signed with the Jacksonville Jaguars as an undrafted free agent and made the team's active roster during the 2018 season. He became the first player from the show to appear in an NFL game after his debut on December 2, 2018, against the Indianapolis Colts.

2016 EMCC Lions players (season 2)
Player	Position	Transfer in	Transfer out	Notes
DeAndre Johnson	QB	Florida State	Florida Atlantic	After sitting out the 2017 season due to blood clots in his arm, Johnson competed with Oklahoma transfer Chris Robison for the starting quarterback position. After not starting for FAU, Johnson transferred to Texas Southern in 2019.
Isaiah Wright	RB	—	West Georgia	Wright participated in spring football at WGU but left the school before the season began. He was arrested for criminal homicide in September 2017. On November 8, 2017, the charges were dismissed against his brother Camion, also featured on Last Chance U. On August 8, 2018, Wright plead guilty to facilitation of aggravated robbery in exchange for having his criminal homicide charge dropped. He received credit for time served and was sentenced to five years of supervised probation. During 2019, Wright joined the Alcoa Alloys of the Independent American Football League. Wright was able to get another chance to play college football at Union College of the NAIA for the 2021 season.
Chauncey Rivers	DL	Georgia	Mississippi State	Rivers was redshirted for the 2017 season due to academic ineligibility. During the 2018 season, Rivers had 2.5 sacks and 24 tackles for the Bulldogs. After the 2019 season where he had 5.0 sacks and 40 tackles, Rivers was named to the 2019 All-SEC football team. In April 2020, the Baltimore Ravens signed Rivers as an undrafted free agent.
Dakota Allen	LB	Texas Tech	Texas Tech	Had a breakout junior season in 2017, with 92 tackles, 12 tackles for loss, and six forced turnovers. Named All-Big 12 by Pro Football Focus and second-team All-Big 12 by coaches and media. Allen was officially invited for the NFL Scouting Combine in 2019. He was selected by the Los Angeles Rams in the seventh round of the 2019 NFL draft and became the first player of the show to be picked in the NFL Draft. He signed a contract with the Rams on June 7, 2019. He was signed off the Rams' practice squad by the Oakland Raiders in September, and made his NFL debut the following month. However, he was waived by the end of the month, and returned to the Rams' practice squad again in November, leaving a second time to sign with the Jacksonville Jaguars in December.
Kamonte "Kam" Carter	DL	Penn State	Pittsburgh	Played sparingly at Pitt and in January 2018, announced he was transferring. Ultimately transferred to Duquesne for the 2018 and 2019 season, where he made the All-NEC First Team both seasons.
Tim Bonner	DL	Louisville	Florida Atlantic	Joined the BC Lions of the Canadian Football League.
Ezekiel Rose	DL	—	West Virginia	
Vijay Miller	QB	—	—	Also played baseball at EMCC as a pitcher and was drafted in the 14th round of the 2017 MLB draft by the San Diego Padres. After pitching for the Arizona League Padres for the summer, Miller returned to EMCC for the 2018 season.

2017 ICC Pirates players (season 3)
Player	Position	Transfer in	Transfer out	Notes
Malik Henry	QB	Florida State	Nevada	Henry failed to receive an offer from a Power Five conferences school, and was listed on the 2018 ICC football roster. He announced in January 2019 that he would be walking-on at Nevada. He started two games and then left the school. He later joined the Frisco Fighters in the Indoor Football League.
Rakeem Boyd	RB	Texas A&M	Arkansas	Rushed for 2,176 yards and 13 touchdowns during his career at Arkansas.
Kerry Buckmaster	OL	Ventura College	Lindenwood	Later transferred to West Texas A&M. Quit football in March 2019.
Kingston Davis	RB	Michigan	UAB	Cut from the team following an arrest. Later transferred to Lane College.
Carlos Thompson	WR	Texas Tech	Missouri Western	Decided to forgo his senior season and declared for the 2019 NFL draft. He was not drafted.
Emmit Gooden	DL	—	Tennessee	Dismissed from the team following a domestic assault arrest
Calvin Jackson	WR	—	Washington State	
Keith Williams	OL	—	Colorado State	
Delrick Abrams	DB	—	Colorado	

2018 ICC Pirates players (season 4)
Player	Position	Transfer in	Transfer out	Notes
Jay Jones	QB	Georgia Tech	—N/a	
Chase Hildreth	QB	—	Texas State	
Markiese King	WR	—	Lamar	King signed a National Letter of Intent to play at Lamar, but he withdrew from Independence before graduation, making him ineligible to play Division I college football. Later enrolled at Central Oklahoma
Jermaine Johnson II	DL	—	Georgia	By far the biggest success from the show. Played two seasons before transferring to Florida State. As a fifth-year senior with the Seminoles, Johnson led the ACC in tackles for loss (18) and sacks (12.0), was named 1st Team All-Conference, ACC Defensive Player of the Year, was a finalist for the Ted Hendricks Award for college football's best defensive end, and was included in several All-America teams. He was drafted 26th overall in the 2022 NFL draft by the New York Jets and named as an alternate to the 2024 Pro Bowl Games roster.
Bobby Bruce	S	—	Manatee Neptunes	A student reported $250 stolen from his dorm room. Bruce was seen on video entering the room with two other people and leaving with a full bag in his hand that he hadn't had with him when entering the room. Bruce was cut from the football team. Subsequently, he signed to play arena football for the A-League's Manatee Neptunes. In February 2020, he was arrested for cocaine possession.
Kailon Davis	DL	—	Arkansas State	Medically retired from football in 2021, later joined the Arkansas–Pine Bluff Golden Lions. Davis went unselected in the 2022 NFL draft, and signed with the Saskatchewan Roughriders of the CFL before being released during the offseason.
Chance Main	DL	—	Incarnate Word	Played 2 years at Incarnate Word, and took the 2021 season off for rehab. Later signed with the Colorado Buffaloes for the 2022 season.

2019 Laney Eagles players (season 5)
Player	Position	Transfer in	Transfer out	Notes
Dior Walker-Scott	WR	—	Hawai'i	Preferred walk-on in 2020. Earned a full scholarship in 2021.
RJ Stern	WR	—		Decommitted from Tusculum
Day'Marr Johnson	WR	—	Merritt	
Nu’u Taugavau	OL	—	Murray State	One of his uncles played at Murray State
Ryan Mackey	QB	—		Returned to Laney College for the 2020–21 season
Kentrell Pierce	DB	—	Lincoln (PA)	
Rejzohn Wright	DB	—	Oregon State	Currently plays for the New Orleans Saints
Keyshawn Ashford	RB	—	Foothill	
Alex Gonsalves	RB	—	—	

== Crew ==
- Benjamin Cotner – executive producer
- Edgar Doumerc – sound department
- Joe Labracio – executive producer
- Adam Leibowitz – producer
- Lisa Nishimura – executive producer
- Dawn Ostroff – executive producer
- Adam Ridley – producer, director, editor
- Jihan Robinson – executive producer
- James D. Stern – executive producer
- Lucas Smith – executive producer
- Greg Whiteley – director, executive producer
- Sam Young – sound department
- Yuri Tománek – original music
- Joseph Minadeo – original music

== Last Chance U: Basketball (spin-off series) ==
On March 10, 2021, a spin-off series Last Chance U: Basketball premiered on Netflix, introducing a new sport for the award-winning documentary series to follow. The eight-episode first season explores the basketball program at East Los Angeles College, which features a once faltering junior college team that has become a title contender under head coach John Mosley. Through his strong convictions, Coach Mosley leads young men who hope to fulfill their major college potential. On September 10, 2021, the series was renewed for a second season. The second season premiered on December 13, 2022.

=== Synopsis ===
Mosley's Huskies enjoyed their best season in ELAC history during the 2019–20 season. The team had their eyes on the CCCAA State Title, entering the Championship Tournament with a program-best 29–1 record while being ranked the second-best team in the state. Their season was cancelled, however, due to the COVID-19 pandemic.

ELAC Huskies 2019–2020 Season Results
Date	Opponent	Notes	Site	Result
November 1	Oxnard	COC Tournament Event from 11/1-11/2	Oxnard	W 120–68
November 2	Cuyamaca	COC Tournament Event from 11/1-11/2	Oxnard College	W 71–40
November 9	Arizona Mesa		Arizona Mesa	W 78–72
November 15	Grossmont	Hunter Classic Event from 11/15-11/17	San Bernardino	W 98–63
November 16	Copper Mountain	San Bernardino Tournament Event from 11/15-11/17	San Bernardino	L 78–76
November 17	Antelope Valley	SBVC Tournament Event from 11/15-11/17	San Bernardino	W 89–85
November 27	Santa Monica		Santa Monica	W 87–82
December 4	Mt. San Jacinto	RCC Holiday Tournament	Wheelock Gym, Riverside City College	W 70–61
December 5	Riverside	AHF Riverside Classic	Riverside	W 79–73
December 7	Copper Mountain	Riverside Classic	Wheelock Gym, Riverside City College	W 86–69
December 14	Cerritos		ELAC	W 57–51
December 18	Citrus		ELAC	W 77–69
December 28	San Diego Miramar	Cuyamaca Classic	Cuyamaca College	W 73–62
December 29	Cuyamaca	Cuyamaca Classic	Cuyamaca	W 69–42
December 30	Southwestern	Cuyamaca Classic	Cuyamaca College	W 93–74
January 3	El Camino		El Camino	W 126–81
January 8	LA Southwest		ELAC	W 85–72
January 10	LA Harbor		LA Harbor	W 82–68
January 15	Compton		Compton	W 93–82
January 17	Long Beach		ELAC	W 83–68
January 22	LA Trade Tech		ELAC	W 98–77
January 29	Pasadena City	SCC North	ELAC	W 102–72
January 31	Mt. San Antonio		Mt. San Antonio	W 90–80
February 5	Rio Hondo		ELAC	W 107–79
February 7	LA Trade Tech		LA Trade Tech	W 94–59
February 14	Pasadena City	SCC North	Pasadena City	W 86–78
February 19	Mt. San Antonio		ELAC	W 97–69
February 21	Rio Hondo		Rio Hondo	W 109–86
February 29	Saddleback	Southern California Regional, Round 2	ELAC	W 69–53
March 7	Allan Hancock	Southern California Regional Final	ELAC	W 68–65
March 13	Santa Rosa	CCCAA Championship, Quarterfinals	West Hills Lemoore College	Cancelled

=== Featured staff ===
==== ELAC ====
- John Mosley (head coach)
- Kenneth Hunter (assistant coach)
- Frankie Aguilar (assistant coach)
- Robert Robinson (assistant coach)
- Eric Guzman (team manager)
- Bianca Lopez (team manager)

=== Players ===
2019 ELAC Huskies players
Player	Position	Transfer In	Transfer Out	Notes
Joe Hampton	Forward	Penn State	Long Beach State	After a four-year long struggle, Hampton finally returned to Division I basketball at Long Beach University. He averaged 10.3 points and 4.1 rebounds during the 2020–2021 season and 9.1 points and 3.7 rebounds during the 2021–2022 season. After leaving Long Beach State, Hampton joined the Panthers Fürstenfeld in Austria.
Deshaun Highler	Guard	UTEP	Sacramento State	Highler transferred to Sacramento State University, where he averaged 5.0 points a game for the 2020–2021 season and 4.5 points a game for the 2021–2022 season. After leaving Sacramento State, Deshaun joined the Cimarrones del Choco of the Baloncesto Profesional Colombiano.
Malik Muhammad	Forward	–	Central Michigan	Muhammad ended up at Central Michigan University, averaging a little over 20 minutes and 5.5 points a game in the 2020–2021 season. For the 2021–2022 year, Muhammad transferred to Southern Utah, averaging a little over 5 minutes and 0.7 points a game in the 2021–2022 season. For the 2022–2023 season, Malik transferred again to Campbellsville University in the NAIA.
KJ Allen	Forward	–	Texas Tech	Allen committed to USC but later de-committed and committed to Texas Tech. After 2 years at Texas Tech, Allen transferred to Portland State.
LJ Zeigler	Guard	–	Chicago State	Zeigler earned some playing time at Chicago State University before his season was once again cancelled due to the pandemic. Zeigler later transferred to Emporia State in the NAIA for the 2022–2023 season.

=== Episodes of Last Chance U: Basketball ===
Series overview
Season	Episodes	Originally released
1	8	March 10, 2021
2	8	December 13, 2022

==== Season 1 (2021) ====
No. overall	No. in season	Title	Original release date
1	1	"The Window"	March 10, 2021
2	2	"Hooper"	March 10, 2021
3	3	"Jenny"	March 10, 2021
4	4	"In My Father's House"	March 10, 2021
5	5	"Colby Ranch"	March 10, 2021
6	6	"Get Thee Behind Me"	March 10, 2021
7	7	"Lifers"	March 10, 2021
8	8	"Bound for Promised Land"	March 10, 2021

==== Season 2 (2022) ====
No. overall	No. in season	Title	Original release date
9	1	"When I'm Playing Basketball"	December 13, 2022
10	2	"The Heart Of The Program"	December 13, 2022
11	3	"Father, Consume Me"	December 13, 2022
12	4	"Game Hunters"	December 13, 2022
13	5	"Mr Mosley Was a Good Man"	December 13, 2022
14	6	"You Go, I Go"	December 13, 2022
15	7	"Jump Stops Will Change Your life"	December 13, 2022
16	8	"Everything Goes Away"	December 13, 2022

== See also ==
- Cheer
- Hoop Dreams
- Wrestlers
