= Copper Mountain College =

Community college in Joshua Tree, California, US

Coordinates: 34°08′29″N 116°12′49″W

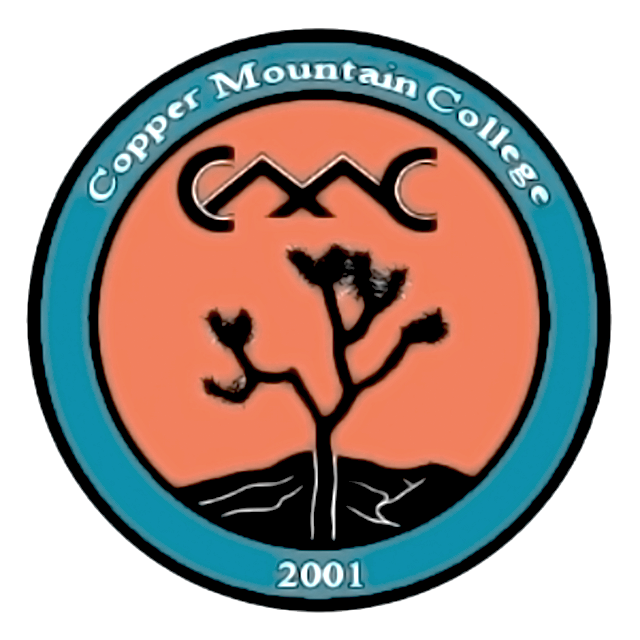
- Former name: Copper Mountain Community College
- Parent institution: California Community Colleges system
- Accreditation: ACCJC
- President: Daren Otten
- Location: Joshua Tree, California, United States
- Colors: Teal and Copper
- Nickname: Fighting Cacti
- Sporting affiliations: Inland Empire Athletic Conference
- Mascots: Spike, the Fighting Cacti
- Website: www.cmccd.edu

Copper Mountain College (CMC) is a public community college in Joshua Tree, California. It was accredited in 2001 as the 108th such institution in the state. CMC offers a total of 24 different certificates and degrees.

== History ==
CMC was originally an offshoot of the College of the Desert. Founded in 1966 for the purpose of providing education opportunities for the surrounding desert communities and families stationed at the 29 Palms Marine Corps Air Ground Combat Center, the college held its first courses in classrooms at the 29 Palms High School campus during the fall, 1967 semester. Fundraising for the construction of a stand-alone campus began in 1981, with its first phase completed in 1984. Former major general Edward J. Megarr was chosen to serve as president, serving in 1985. At that time State Senator James Brulte learned of Copper Mountain wanting to achieve community college status he introduced the Copper Mountain Community College District legislation. The Morongo Basin residents endorsed their new college in a 90 percent vote in November 1999. In June 2001, the Accrediting Commission for Community and Junior Colleges of the Western Association of Schools and Colleges granted CMC full accreditation status.

== Athletics ==
The athletics program launched in 2017 with only basketball. Copper Mountain College competes in Men's and Women's basketball and Women's volleyball in the Orange Empire Conference. The team nickname is the Fighting Cacti. In 2019 Copper Mountain College joined the newly formed Inland Empire Athletic Conference.

== Student Government ==
Student demographics as of Fall 2023
Race and ethnicity	Total
Hispanic	42%
White	37%
African American	8%
Multiracial	7%
Filipino	4%
Asian	2%
Pacific Islander	1%
Unknown	1%

The students of Copper Mountain College have established a student body association named Associated Students of Copper Mountain College (ASCMC). The association is required by law to "encourage students to participate in the governance of the college".

ASCMC is a voting member of a statewide community college student organization named Student Senate for California Community Colleges. The statewide Student Senate is authorized by law "to advocate before the Legislature and other state and local governmental entities".

== Bud and Betty's Place for Veterans ==
In November 2015, CMC opened Bud and Betty's Place for Veterans as a center for Students that have served in the armed forces. The center was opened as an extension to the Christine Proudfoot activity center that opened that same year. The center has been named after Retired Col. Bud Garrett and his wife Betty. Col Garrett donated a large sum of money to the center in his wife's honor.

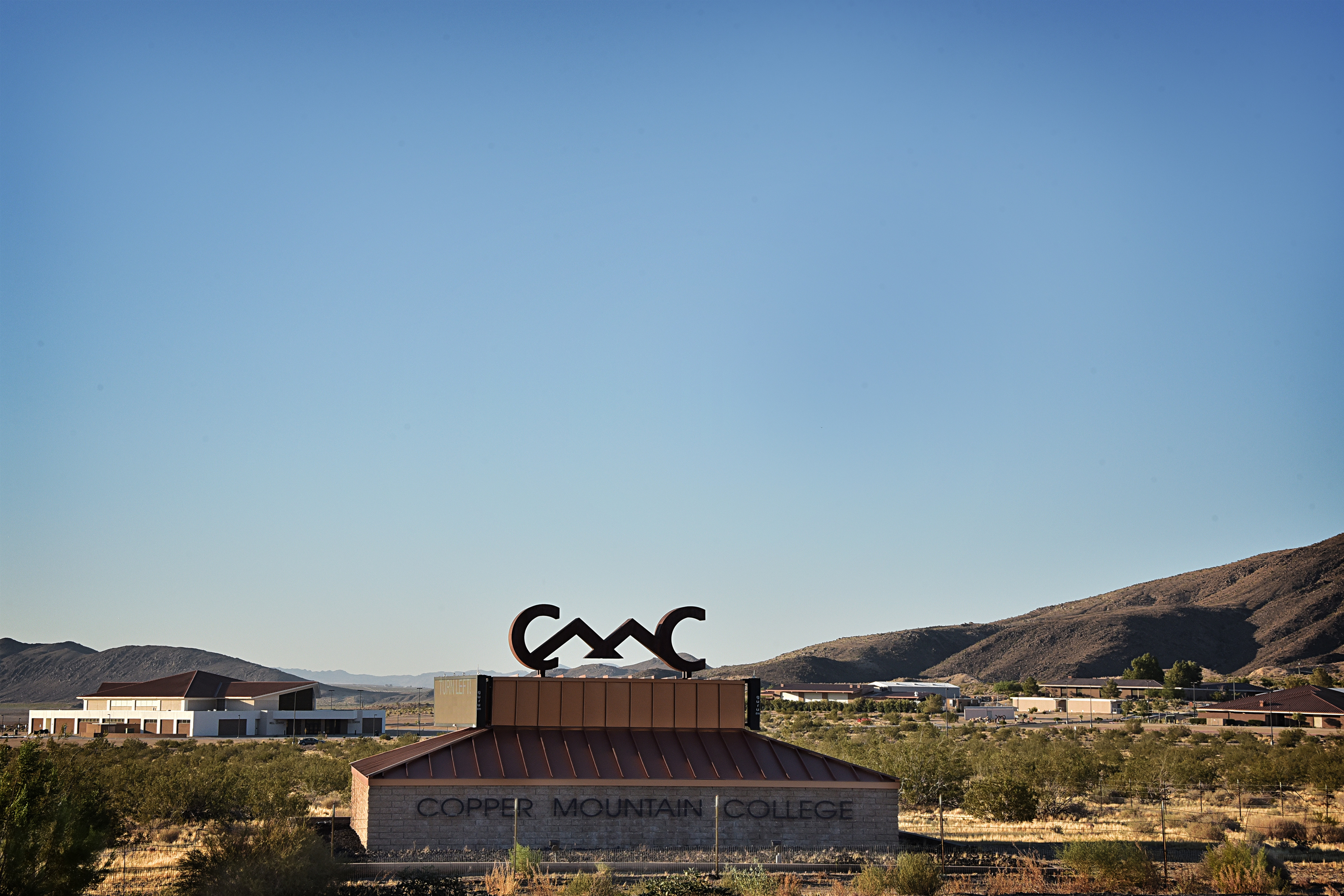
Copper Mountain College sign with campus in background in June 2017

== See also ==
- California Community Colleges system
