= Merritt College =

Community college in Oakland, California, US

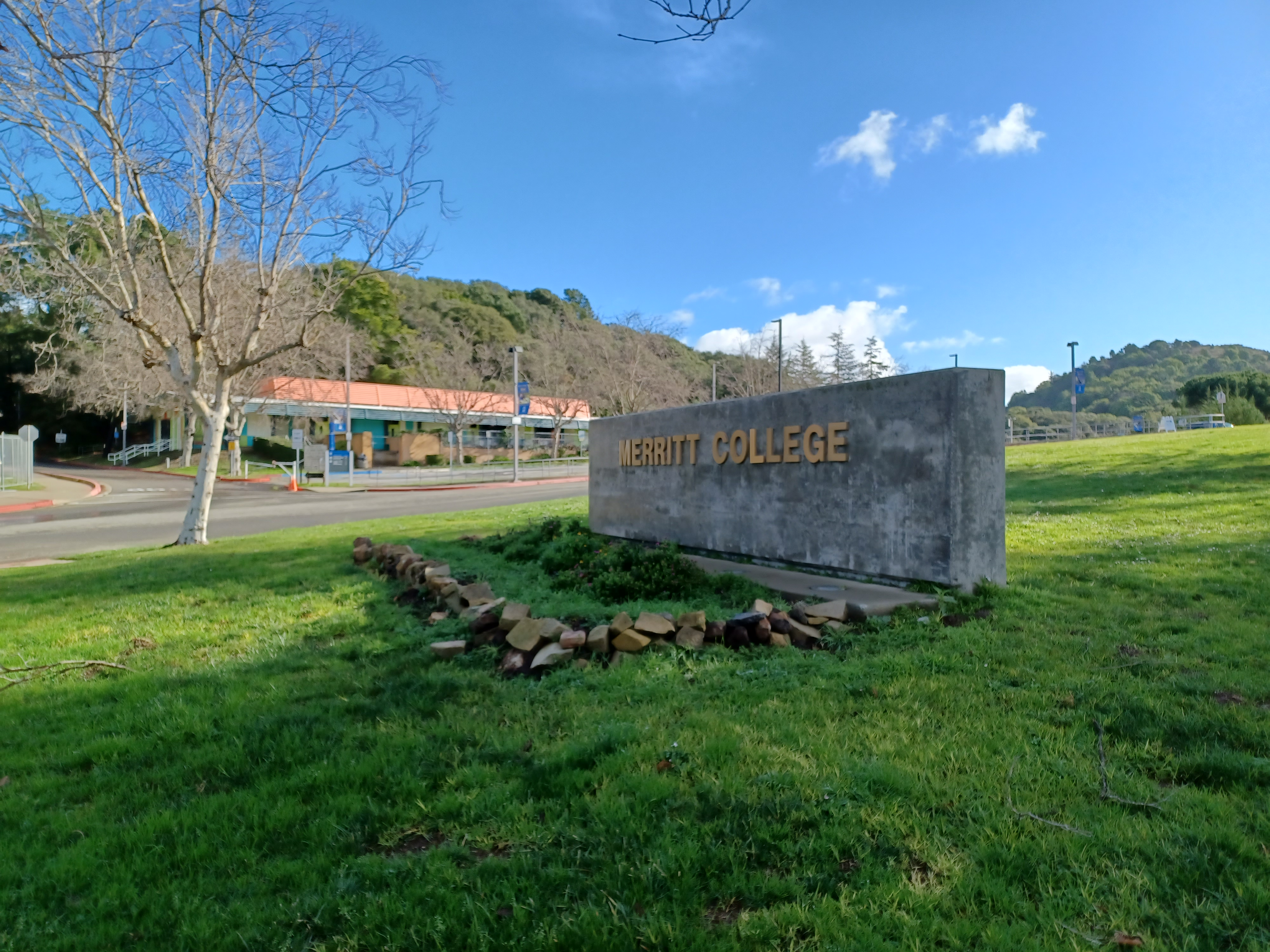
- Type: Public community college
- Established: 1954
- Parent institution: California Community Colleges, Peralta Community College District
- Accreditation: ACCJC
- President: David M. Johnson
- Students: 6,000
- Location: Oakland, California, U.S. 37°47′19.72″N 122°9′59.01″W
- Campus: Suburban: 125 acres (0.5 km²)
- Colors: Royal Blue, Gold and White
- Nickname: Panthers
- Website: www.merritt.edu

Merritt College is a public community college in Oakland, California, United States. Merritt, like the other three campuses of the Peralta Community College District, is accredited by the Accrediting Commission for Community and Junior Colleges. The college enrolls approximately 6,000 students.

== History ==
Merritt College (named for physician Samuel Merritt) was opened as a general campus in 1954. Merritt College was originally located on Grove Street in North Oakland but later moved to Campus Drive in the hills of East Oakland.

=== Grove Street ===
The original Merritt College was located at what is now 5714 Martin Luther King Jr. Way (then called Grove Street) in the flatlands of North Oakland. In 1923, the campus of University High School was built for children of faculty of the University of California, Berkeley. The campus closed during World War II, but was reopened as the Merritt School of Business in 1946. In 1954, the Oakland Unified School District, then operating the Merritt campus and the Laney Trade and Technical School, formed Oakland Junior College (later renamed Oakland City College). In 1960, the same year as the opening of Skyline High School, OUSD decided to relocate Merritt College from Grove Street to the hills of East Oakland.

Although the demographics of North Oakland changed throughout the 1950s and 1960s, it was not until the mid-to-late-1960s that the student and faculty population began to change. After the 1960 California Master Plan for Public Higher Education, more Black students began to attend Merritt. In the early 1960s, the Afro-American Association began recruiting Merritt students. By 1964, students formed the Soul Students Advisory Council, predecessors to the Black Student Union (BSU). Merritt Community College was the meeting place for prominent leaders of the Black Panther Party, Bobby Seale and Huey P. Newton. The two met in September 1962 and shortly after began organizing the Black Panther Party. There were many public displays of unrest on the campus during this time, speaking to the Cuban blockade, the black experience, and other political topics. The two leaders also attended many politically charged classes at the school such as experimental sociology, Black History, and Negro History. This occurred in September 1966 and started as Huey and Bobby brainstorming a ten-point platform. As the two grew closer, they first became involved in local organizations in Oakland only to eventually create their own.

Against numerous protests by students and community members, Merritt was relocated from Grove Street to the hills of East Oakland in 1971. Merritt was renamed North Peralta Community College but was commonly known as Grove Street College. In 1975, a judge ordered the physical plant closed for seismic issues. The Grove Street campus was used as the primary filming location for the 1987 film, The Principal.

This site, now rehabilitated and serving as the north campus of the Children's Hospital and Research Center Oakland, was added to the National Register of Historic Places in 1992.

=== Campus Drive ===
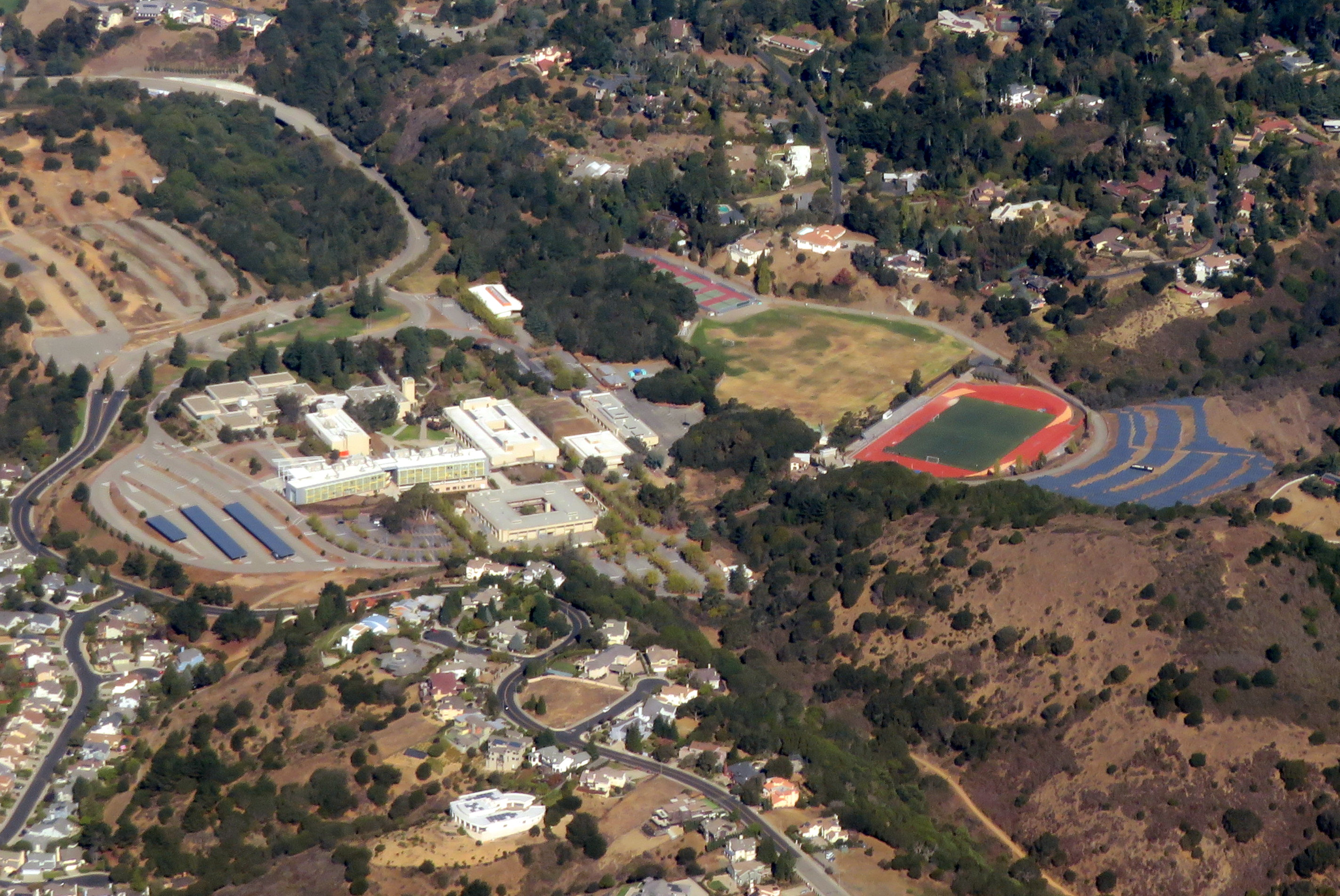
Aerial view of the present campus in 2020

The present campus was opened in 1971. Funding came primarily as a result of a 1965 bond issue which also established a new downtown Oakland ("Civic Center") campus building for Laney College and the founding of the College of Alameda.

== Occupational programs ==
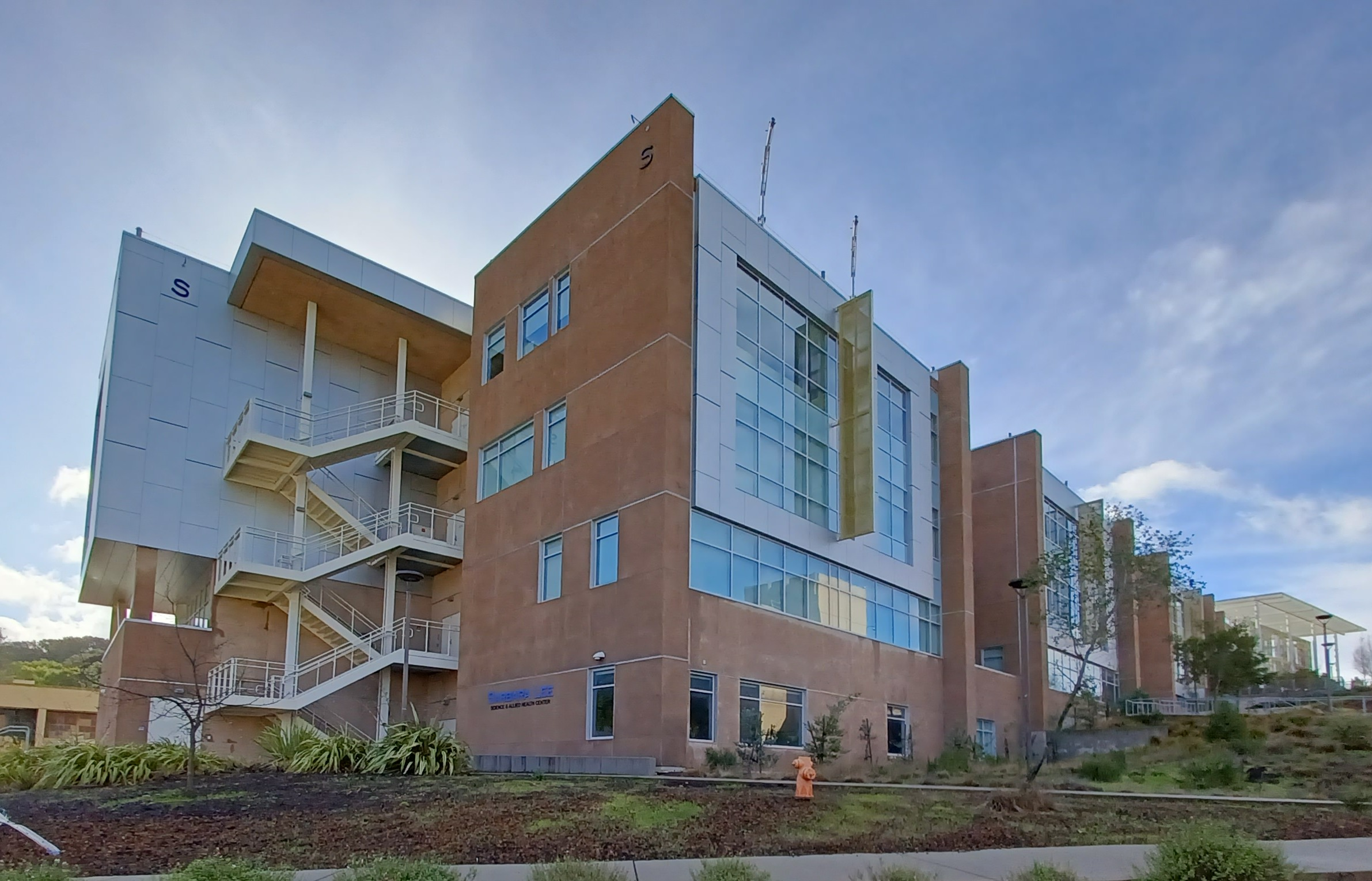

Merritt College's occupational programs include nursing and health professions, community social services/substance abuse counseling, environmental management and technology, cybersecurity, computer information systems, landscape horticulture and environmental management, paralegal studies, real estate and restoration technology. A one-year Microscopy Certificate is also offered.

== Notable alumni ==
=== Oakland City College, Merritt campus ===
- Richard Aoki, Black Panther Party official and FBI informant
- Saundra Brown Armstrong, district judge
- Chauncey Bailey, journalist
- Wendell Hayes, National Football League player
- Elbert Howard, Black Panther Party co-founder
- Judy Juanita, poet, novelist and playwright
- MacArthur Lane, National Football League player
- Ted Lange, actor
- Joe Morgan, Major League Baseball player
- Gerald Nachman, journalist
- Huey P. Newton, Black Panther Party co-founder
- Patricia Rodriguez, artist
- Pharoah Sanders, jazz musician
- Bobby Seale, Black Panther Party co-founder
- Ron Silliman, poet
- Marvin X, poet and playwright
- René Yañez, artist and community activist

=== Merritt College ===
- John Bailey, actor
- Glenn Burke, Major League Baseball player
- Percy Robert Miller (Master P), rapper, record producer, actor

== See also ==
- Berkeley City College
- Laney College
- College of Alameda
