= Edward J. Megarr =

United States Marine Corps major general

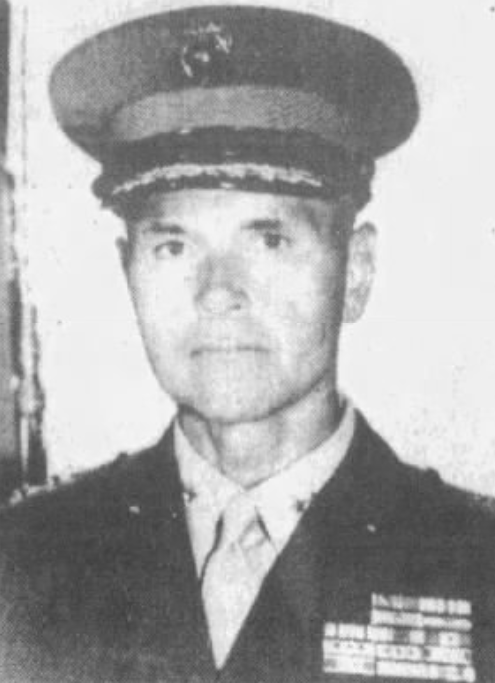
- Megarr in 1981
- Born: Edward John Megarr; March 20, 1927; Brooklyn, New York, U.S.
- Died: January 12, 2019 (aged 91) Napa, California, U.S.
- Allegiance: United States of America
- Branch: United States Marine Corps
- Service years: 1950–1982
- Rank: Major general
- Commands: 4th Marine Division
- Conflicts: World War II
- Awards: Legion of Merit
- Spouse: Jane Gulbransen (m. 1950)

Edward John Megarr (March 20, 1927 – January 12, 2019) was a United States Marine Corps major general.

== Life and career ==
Megarr was born in Brooklyn, New York, the son of John and Violet Megarr. He attended Adelphi University, earning his BA degree in 1950. After earning his degree, he was commissioned in the United States Marine Corps, serving as a platoon commander in Korea. During his military service, he was awarded the Legion of Merit, "for exceptionally meritorious conduct".

Megarr served as commanding general of the 4th Marine Division from June 1980, until his retirement in August 1982, retiring at the rank of major general. After retiring from his military service, he served as president of Copper Mountain College in 1985.

== Death ==
Megarr died on January 12, 2019, in Napa, California, at the age of 91.
