= Rejzohn Wright =

American football player (born 2000)

No. 48 – New Orleans Saints
- Position: Cornerback
- Roster status: Injured reserve

Personal information
- Born: September 4, 2000 (age 26); Union City, California, U.S.
- Listed height: 6 ft 2 in (1.88 m)
- Listed weight: 193 lb (88 kg)

Career information
- High school: James Logan (Union City)
- College: Laney (2018–2019); Oregon State (2020–2022)
- NFL draft: 2023: undrafted

Career history
- Carolina Panthers (2023)*; Las Vegas Raiders (2023)*; New Orleans Saints (2024–present)
- * Offseason or practice squad member only

Awards and highlights
- First-team All-Pac-12 (2022)
- Stats at Pro Football Reference

Rejzohn Wright (/ˈreɪˌʒɑːn/ RAY-zhawn; born September 4, 2000) is an American professional football cornerback for the New Orleans Saints of the National Football League (NFL). He played college football for the Oregon State Beavers, as well as junior college football for the Laney Eagles.

== Early life ==
Wright grew up in East Palo Alto, California and attended James Logan High School.

== College career ==
Wright began his college football career at Laney College, spending two seasons there. While at Laney, he was featured in the fifth season of the Netflix documentary series Last Chance U, where he played under head coach John Beam. He committed to transfer to Oregon State University for his remaining eligibility over an offer from the University of Central Florida.

Wright played in five games during his first season with the Oregon State Beavers. He started all 13 of the team's games at cornerback and had 52 tackles with one sack, two interceptions, and eight passes broken up in 2021. Wright was named first team All-Pac-12 as a senior after making 38 tackles with two interceptions and nine passes broken up.

== Professional career ==
Pre-draft measurables
Height	Weight	Arm length	Hand span	Wingspan
6 ft 1 5/8 in (1.87 m)	193 lb (88 kg)	32 1/2 in (0.83 m)	9 5/8 in (0.24 m)	6 ft 4 7/8 in (1.95 m)
All values from the NFL Combine

=== Carolina Panthers ===
Wright was signed by the Carolina Panthers as an undrafted free agent on April 29, 2023. He was waived on August 26.

=== Las Vegas Raiders ===
On October 5, 2023, Wright signed with the practice squad of the Las Vegas Raiders. He was released on October 11.

=== New Orleans Saints ===
On January 16, 2024, Wright signed a reserve/future contract with the New Orleans Saints. He was placed on injured reserve on August 27.

Wright was placed on injured reserve on August 24, 2026, due to a hip injury that required season-ending surgery.

== Personal life ==
Wright's older brother, Nahshon Wright, was a teammate at Oregon State and currently plays for the New York Jets. His cousin Mekhi Blackmon plays cornerback for the Indianapolis Colts. Another cousin, Bump Cooper Jr., plays cornerback for the Birmingham Stallions.
