= Ezekiel Rose =

American football player (born 1996)

Kentucky Barrels
- Position: Defensive tackle
- Roster status: Active

Personal information
- Born: November 16, 1996 (age 29)
- Listed height: 6 ft 2 in (1.88 m)
- Listed weight: 308 lb (140 kg)

Career information
- High school: Clarksdale (Clarksdale, Mississippi)
- College: East Mississippi (2015–2016); West Virginia (2017–2018)
- NFL draft: 2019: undrafted

Career history
- Winnipeg Blue Bombers (2020–2021); Saskatchewan Roughriders (2022)*; Massachusetts Pirates (2022–2023); Nashville Kats (2024); Albany Firebirds (2025); Kentucky Barrels (2026–present)
- * Offseason or practice squad member only

Awards and highlights
- Grey Cup champion (2021); Arena Crown champion (2025); First-team All-Arena (2025)

Ezekiel Rose (born November 16, 1996) is an American professional football defensive tackle for the Kentucky Barrels of Arena Football One (AF1). He played college football at East Mississippi and West Virginia.

== Early life ==
Ezekiel Rose was born on November 16, 1996. He played high school football at Clarksdale High School in Clarksdale, Mississippi. He posted 17 tackles and one sack his junior year. As a senior, he recorded 51 tackles and five sacks. Rose also played tennis in high school.

== College career ==
Rose received an offer from Alcorn State University to play college football but chose to attend East Mississippi Community College instead so he could transfer to a bigger school. He played football at East Mississippi from 2015 to 2016. He played in eight games as a true freshman in 2015, totaling nine tackles and two pass breakups. He appeared in ten games during the 2016 season, recording 35 tackles, 6.5 sacks, and two forced fumbles. While at East Mississippi, he was featured on the documentary Last Chance U.

Rose transferred to play for the West Virginia Mountaineers in 2017. He appeared in all 13 games, starting three at defensive end, during the 2017 season, accumulating 19 solo tackles, four assisted tackles, one forced fumble, one interception, two pass breakups, and a team-leading 4.5 sacks. Rose played in 12 games, starting two, his senior year in 2018, totaling 12 solo tackles, seven assisted tackles, 1.5 sacks, and one interception. He was named second-team Academic All-Big 12 for the 2018 season. He graduated from WVU in December 2018 with a bachelor's degree in multidisciplinary studies.

== Professional career ==
After going undrafted in the 2019 NFL draft, Rose attended rookie minicamp on a tryout basis with the New Orleans Saints. On November 2, 2019, Rose signed a futures contract with the Winnipeg Blue Bombers of the Canadian Football League (CFL). The 2020 CFL season was cancelled due to the COVID-19 pandemic. He was moved to the practice roster on July 31, 2021, before the start of the 2021 CFL season. Rose was promoted to the active roster on September 4, 2021, and made his CFL debut the next day against the Saskatchewan Roughriders. However, he suffered a torn ACL during the game and was placed on injured reserve on September 10, 2021, where he spent the remainder of the season. On December 12, 2021, the Blue Bombers won the 108th Grey Cup against the Hamilton Tiger-Cats by a score of 33–25. Rose became a free agent after the 2021 season.

Rose was signed by the Saskatchewan Roughriders on May 9, 2022. He was released on May 15, 2022.

On July 5, 2022, Rose signed with the Massachusetts Pirates of the Indoor Football League. He played in the final three games of the season for the Pirates, posting nine solo tackles and 10 assisted tackles. On December 5, 2022, he re-signed with the Pirates for the 2023 season.

Rose played in six regular season games for the Nashville Kats of the Arena Football League in 2024, and made five sacks. He also had 1.5 sacks in a playoff game for the Kats.

Rose played for the Albany Firebirds of Arena Football One (AF1) in 2025 and earned first-team All-Arena honors. The Firebirds went undefeated and won the Arena Crown (the AF1 championship).

On September 29, 2025, Rose signed with the AF1's Kentucky Barrels for the 2026 season.

== Personal life ==
Rose also works as a financial advisor.
