= Laney College =

Community college in Oakland, California, US

Coordinates: 37.79637°N 122.26280°W

- Motto: Dream. Flourish. Succeed.
- Type: Public community college
- Established: 1953; 73 years ago
- Parent institution: Peralta Community College District and California Community Colleges
- Chancellor: Tammeil Gilkerson
- President: Rebecca Opsata
- Faculty: 400+
- Students: 16,543
- Location: Oakland, California, United States
- Campus: Urban: 60 acres (0.24 km²)
- Colors: Forest green and silver
- Nickname: Eagles
- Mascot: Eddie the Eagle
- Website: laney.edu

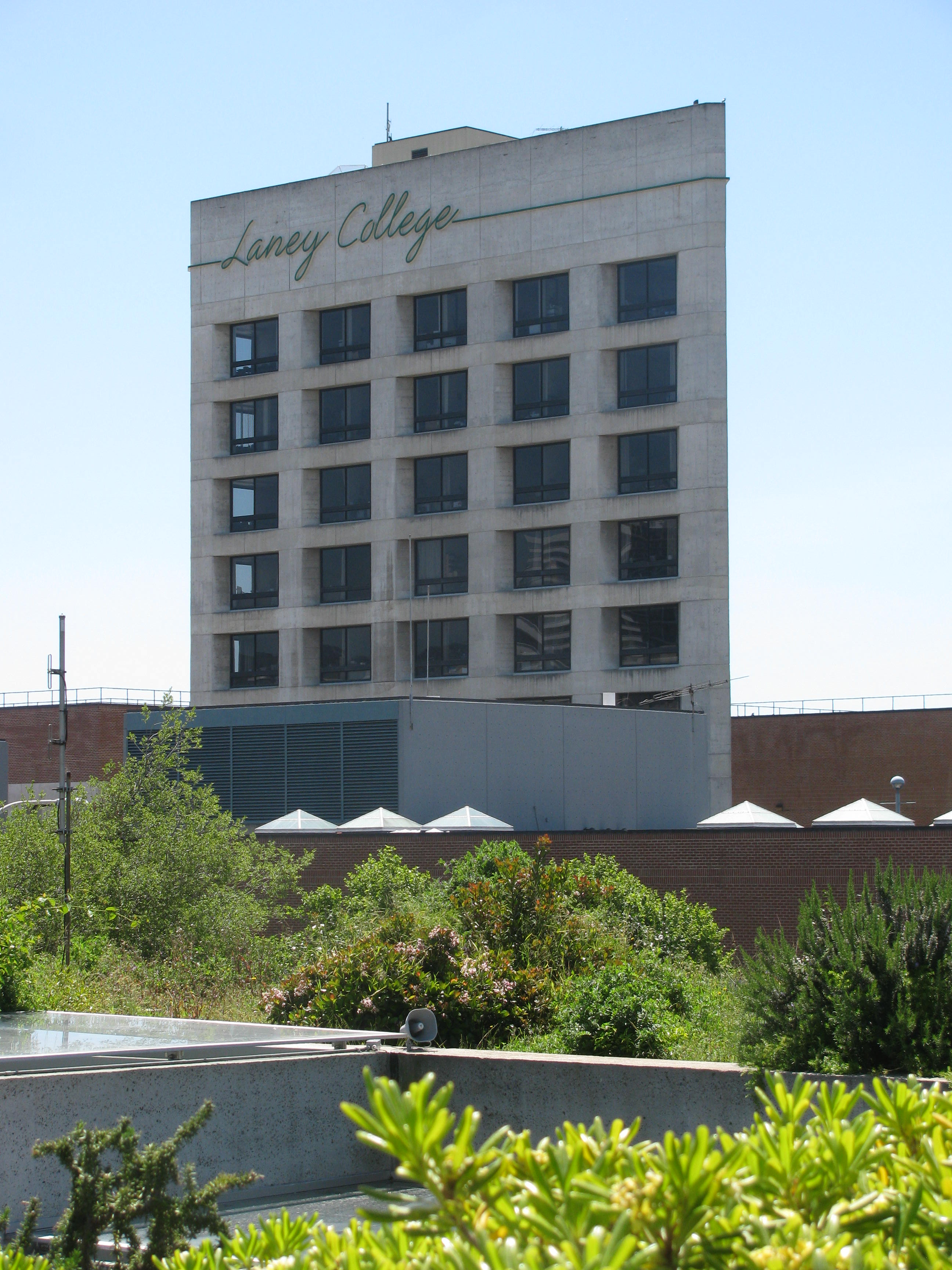
Image of Laney College tower and brick campus in 2010.

Laney College is a public community college in Oakland, California, United States. Laney is the largest of the four colleges of the Peralta Community College District which serves northern Alameda County. Laney College is named after Joseph Clarence Laney, a journalist who founded the Oakland Central Trade School. The college offers both certificates and credits for Associate of Arts degree, as well as prerequisites to transfer to four year universities. It is accredited by the Accrediting Commission for Community and Junior Colleges. Laney College is located in District 7 of the Peralta Community College District, which is represented by elected board trustee Sheweet Yohannes.

== History ==
Laney College traces its history to the Oakland Central Trade School by the Oakland Board of the Education in 1927 and the Merritt School of Business (now Merritt College) founded in 1929. The trade school was later renamed Joseph C. Laney Trade and Technical Institute. Oakland Junior College was founded in 1953 with Laney serving as the vocational training center and Merritt hosting the liberal arts and business programs. In 1958, the college was renamed Oakland City College. With the establishment of the Peralta Junior College District in 1964, Laney Institute, located on the current campus, and Merritt College became separate autonomous colleges in their present-day forms. The current campus was opened prior to the 1970–71 academic year.

On November 13, 2025, football coach and athletics director John Beam was shot on the campus of Laney College he died the next day. Beam had been prominent among the Laney athletic faculty members who appeared in the fifth season of the Netflix documentary series Last Chance U, released in 2020, which featured the college. The day before he was shot, Beam had expressed concerns about public safety on the campus, and specifically the field house, after the Peralta Community College District in 2020 terminated its contract with the Alameda County Sheriff's Office that provided armed deputies to protect the school and replaced them with six unarmed private contractors.

== Campus ==
Most of the college's academic and administrative buildings are clustered together in a complex in the northern corner of the campus. The buildings are arranged on a rigid grid, with two levels of concrete pathways providing circulation. The square in the center of the complex has been reserved for the quad. Surrounding the quad are the student center, theater, library, and gymnasium. On one corner is the triangular "Laney Tower", the main administration building; on the opposite is another triangular building housing a lecture hall and dance studio. Academic buildings form the outer ring of the complex. Each has a similar design, with outdoor courtyards in the centers of each square on a higher level, ringed by classrooms and offices; and more classrooms and vocational facilities on the lower level, all accessed from the perimeter of the building. However, none of the higher levels are on the same level as each other; they are connected by numerous stairs and ramps. Most of the outer buildings occupy two or three squares on the grid. The entire complex shares a red brick and concrete theme, with sharp corners, square and triangular shapes, and little vegetation.

The newest academic building is the art center, which is adjacent to the main complex but has its own architectural style. The building opened in the 2006–2007 school year. It was designed by Beverly Prior Architects to be built from prefabricated material, because of the short time frame between the start of construction and planned opening.

The channel that connects Lake Merritt to the Oakland Estuary runs through the center of the campus. The southeastern half of the campus on the other side of the channel is mainly used for athletic and Peralta Community College District facilities. This section was also the former site of the World War II "Auditorium Housing Project" which housed war industry workers from around the United States, many of whom worked in the Kaiser Shipyards. The housing was demolished sometime after the war, and in the early 1960s, a temporary football stadium called Frank Youell Field was constructed on the site for use by the Oakland Raiders.

== Student life ==
=== Activities ===
As of the 2024–2025 academic year, Laney had 19 registered student clubs. These clubs ranged from affinity groups such as the Black Student Union to sports fellowships such as Soccer Nation. Laney also offers numerous Student Communities which offer support to students by creating spaces for like minded students. Many of these communities offered tutoring, study spaces, and group mentorship for members.

=== Student government ===
The Associated Students of Laney College (ASLC) is the official student government, composed of a president, vice president, student advocate, treasurer, publicity commissioner, clubs affairs officer, and seven senators, along with secretaries of internal and external affairs. The ASLC allocates funding for student clubs and campus events.

The student advocate serves as Laney College's representative to the Student Senate for California Community Colleges, a statewide body that advocates for student interests at the system-wide level.

=== Athletics ===
In 1960, student Linda Vail won the U.S. Tennis Association national intercollegiate women's tennis championships in both singles and doubles.

==== Football ====
The Laney Eagles compete in the Bay 6 Football Conference, which is governed by the California Community College Athletic Association (CCCAA). From 2012 to 2024 they were led by head coach John Beam, who won the CCCAA Coach of the Year award in 2018.

In the 2018 season, Laney won the CCCAA State Football Championship and was deemed the Mythical National Champion, due to the regional splits between the CCCAA, which governs all 68 California junior college football programs, and the National Junior College Athletic Association, which governs junior college athletics across the rest of the United States, and covers 65 football programs.

In 2020, under athletic director and football coach John Beam, Laney was featured in the fifth season of the Netflix documentary series Last Chance U.

== Notable people ==
=== Faculty ===
- Carole Ward Allen, professor, ethnic studies
- John Beam, football coach
- Phil Snow, football coach

=== Alumni ===
==== Oakland City College, Laney campus ====
- Ron Dellums, US Congressman and mayor of Oakland
- Gil Kahele, Hawaii state legislator
- Frank Oz, puppeteer, director

==== Laney College ====
- Teddy Abrams, orchestral conductor and composer
- C. J. Anderson, football player
- Seth Bogart, artist and musician
- Steve Howard, former MLB player
- Chuck Jacobs, football player
- Sterling Moore, football player
- Reggie Redding, football player
- James Robinson, US track champion 800 meters
- Tony Sanchez, college football head coach
- George Wells, wrestler
- Tommy Wiseau, director, actor, producer, screenwriter
- Nahshon Wright, football player
- Rejzohn Wright, football player

== See also ==
- Bay Valley Conference
- Berkeley City College
- College of Alameda
- KGPC-LP 96.9 FM
- Oakland City University, a similarly named college in Indiana
