= KGPC-LP =

- Oakland, California; United States
- Frequency: 96.9 MHz

Programming
- Format: Community radio

Ownership
- Owner: Peralta Community College District

History
- First air date: February 6, 2015

Technical information
- Licensing authority: FCC
- Facility ID: 191477
- Class: L1
- ERP: 100 watts
- HAAT: −21.1 meters (−69 ft)
- Transmitter coordinates: 37°47′38.60″N 122°15′33.70″W

Links
- Public license information: LMS
- Webcast: Listen live
- Website: kgpc969.org

KGPC-LP (96.9 FM) is a low-power radio station licensed to Oakland, California, United States, broadcasting a community radio format.

== History ==
KGPC-LP began broadcasting on February 6, 2015.

== See also ==
- Campus radio
- List of college radio stations in the United States
