= Bump Cooper Jr. =

American football player (born 2001)

Ryan Cooper Jr.
Profile
- Position: Cornerback

Personal information
- Born: August 31, 2001 (age 25); Palo Alto, California, U.S.
- Listed height: 5 ft 11 in (1.80 m)
- Listed weight: 186 lb (84 kg)

Career information
- High school: Adrian Wilcox (Santa Clara, California)
- College: San Mateo (2019–2021); Oregon State (2022–2023)
- NFL draft: 2024: undrafted

Career history
- Baltimore Ravens (2024); Seattle Seahawks (2024)*; Miami Dolphins (2025)*; New York Jets (2025)*; Birmingham Stallions (2026); Detroit Lions (2026)*
- * Offseason or practice squad member only

Career NFL statistics as of 2024
- Games: 1
- Stats at Pro Football Reference

Ryan "Bump" Cooper Jr. (born August 31, 2001) is an American professional football cornerback. He played college football at the College of San Mateo and Oregon State. Cooper was signed by the Baltimore Ravens as an undrafted free agent follow the 2024 NFL draft.

== College career ==
=== College of San Mateo ===
During Cooper's three-year career at San Mateo from 2019 through 2021, he played in 22 games, where he notched 47 tackles and four interceptions.

=== Oregon State ===
Cooper decided to commit to play division 1 college football for the Oregon State Beavers. During Cooper's two-year career with the Beavers in 2022 and 2023, he appeared in 23 games, where he totaled 82 tackles, with five being for a loss, a sack and a half, 18 pass deflections, four interceptions, and a touchdown.

== Professional career ==
Pre-draft measurables
Height	Weight	Arm length	Hand span	Wingspan	40-yard dash	10-yard split	20-yard split	20-yard shuttle	Three-cone drill	Vertical jump	Broad jump
5 ft 11 1/4 in (1.81 m)	184 lb (83 kg)	30 1/2 in (0.77 m)	8 3/4 in (0.22 m)	5 ft 11 5/8 in (1.82 m)	4.67 s	1.64 s	2.69 s	4.44 s	7.18 s	31.0 in (0.79 m)	9 ft 8 in (2.95 m)
All values from NFL Combine/Pro Day

=== Baltimore Ravens ===
After not being selected in the 2024 NFL draft, Cooper signed with the Baltimore Ravens as an undrafted free agent. However, on August 27, 2024, Cooper was released during final roster cuts but was re-signed to the team's practice squad the following day. In Week 8, Cooper made his NFL debut against the Cleveland Browns, after being elevated from the team's practice squad. He was released on November 19.

=== Seattle Seahawks ===
On November 26, 2024, Cooper was signed to the Seattle Seahawks practice squad. He signed a reserve/future contract with Seattle on January 6, 2025. Cooper was waived by the Seahawks on February 21.

=== Miami Dolphins ===
On February 24, 2025, Cooper was claimed off waivers by the Miami Dolphins. He was waived on May 8. Cooper was re-signed on May 27, and waived on July 26.

=== New York Jets ===
On July 27, 2025, Cooper was claimed off waivers by the New York Jets. On August 26, he was waived with an injury settlement by the Jets as part of final roster cuts.

=== Birmingham Stallions ===
On January 14, 2025, Cooper was selected by the Birmingham Stallions of the United Football League (UFL).

=== Detroit Lions ===
Following a workout with the team, Cooper signed with the Detroit Lions on August 9, 2026. On August 30, he was waived by the Lions as a part of final roster cuts.

== Personal life ==
Two of Cooper's cousins, Rejzohn Wright and Nahshon Wright, have both played in the NFL. Rejzohn is a cornerback currently with the New Orleans Saints, and Nahshon is a cornerback for the Chicago Bears.
