= Tim Bonner =

American gridiron football player (born 1995)

No. 45
- Position: Defensive end

Personal information
- Born: December 7, 1995 (age 30); Demopolis, Alabama, U.S.
- Listed height: 6 ft 4 in (1.93 m)
- Listed weight: 250 lb (113 kg)

Career information
- High school: Demopolis
- College: East Mississippi CC (2016); Florida Atlantic (2017–2019)

Career history
- 2020–2022: BC Lions
- 2022: Edmonton Elks
- 2023: Houston Gamblers / Roughnecks

Career CFL statistics
- Tackles: 29
- Sacks: 7
- Forced fumbles: 2
- Stats at CFL.ca

Tim Bonner (born December 7, 1995) is an American former professional football defensive end. He played college football for the Florida Atlantic Owls, as well as junior college football for the East Mississippi Lions. He has played in the Canadian Football League (CFL) and in the United States Football League (USFL).

== Early life ==
Bonner grew up in Demopolis, Alabama, and attended Demopolis High School. He was named first team All-State as a senior after recording 84 tackles with 31 tackles for loss and nine sacks in ten games played. A 3-star recruit, Bonner committed to play college football at Louisville over offers from Kentucky, Memphis, Mississippi State, Ole Miss, and UAB, among others.

== College career ==
Bonner began his collegiate career with the Louisville Cardinals, where he redshirted his true freshman season. He was dismissed from the team going into his redshirt freshman season after a female student accused him of having a gun. Following his dismissal, Bonner transferred to East Mississippi Community College. At East Mississippi, he was featured in the second season of the Netflix documentary series Last Chance U, where he played under head coach Buddy Stephens. In his lone season with the Lions, Bonner recorded 37 tackles, 5.5 sacks and two fumble recoveries and committed to transfer to Florida Atlantic University.

Bonner played for the Florida Atlantic Owls for three seasons. He played in 38 games with 58 tackles, 15.5 tackles for loss, eight sacks, and two forced fumbles at FAU.

== Professional career ==
Pre-draft measurables
Height	Weight	Arm length	Hand span
6 ft 3 7/8 in (1.93 m)	239 lb (108 kg)	33 1/2 in (0.85 m)	9 1/8 in (0.23 m)
All values from Pro Day

=== BC Lions ===
On December 9, 2020, Bonner was signed by the BC Lions of the Canadian Football League (CFL). On September 20, 2022, Bonner was released by the Lions.

=== Edmonton Elks ===
On September 22, 2022, Bonner signed with the Edmonton Elks. On February 14, 2023, Bonner was released by the Elks.

=== Houston Gamblers / Roughnecks ===
On February 15, 2023, Bonner signed with the Houston Gamblers of the United States Football League (USFL).

Bonner and all other Houston Gamblers players and coaches were all transferred to the Houston Roughnecks after it was announced that the Gamblers took on the identity of their XFL counterpart, the Roughnecks. He was removed from the roster on February 15, 2024.
