= Peralta Community College District =

Community college district in California, USA

Coordinates: 37°47′38″N 122°15′32″W

The Peralta Community College District is the community college district serving northern Alameda County, California. The district operates four community colleges: Berkeley City College, Laney College and Merritt College in Oakland, and College of Alameda.

== Accreditation ==
The colleges in the Peralta Community College District are accredited by the Accrediting Commission for Community and Junior Colleges. In January 2020, the colleges were placed on probation for severe financial and governance problems at the district. In January 2022, the colleges were removed from probation by ACCJC following improvements in finance and governance and placed on warning status (a less severe sanction) with follow-up reports due on October 1, 2022. In January 2023, the colleges were removed from sanction by ACCJC and reaffirmed accreditation for the remainder of the current cycle.

== History ==
=== Junior Colleges in Oakland Unified School District ===
The first colleges that are now part of Peralta Community College District have their roots in the Central Trade School (later the Joseph C. Laney Trade and Technical Institute), founded in 1927, and the Merritt School of Business founded in 1929. Both were operated by the Oakland Unified School District, then called the Oakland Board of Education. In 1953, the school district founded Oakland Junior College, with the Laney campus serving as the vocational training center and Merritt campus hosting the liberal arts and business programs. Oakland Junior College became Oakland City College in 1958.

From 1968 to 1988, non-contiguous Plumas County was part of the district, and Feather River College was operated by the district. Plumas County and Feather River College are now part of the Feather River Community College District.

=== Peralta Community College District ===
In 1963, the residents of Alameda, Albany, Berkeley, Emeryville, Oakland, and Piedmont voted to form a single community college district. The district began operations under the Peralta name on July 1, 1964. The Peralta name was selected because all of the cities of the district, now a part of the greater Oakland metropolitan region, are located on the original Spanish land grant for Sergeant Luís María Peralta dating from August 1820.

With the founding of Peralta Community College District, the campuses of Oakland City College were split into their own community colleges, Laney College and Merritt College. In 1965, a bond issue was passed which established a new downtown Oakland campus building for Laney College (opened in 1970), a new campus for Merritt College (opened in 1971), and the founding of the College of Alameda. Berkeley City College was established in 1974 and operated under the name Vista Community College until 2006, when it began to operate from a permanent site.

Feather River College was operated by the Peralta CCD from 1968 to 1988, when Plumas County was de-annexed from the district; it now operates as the flagship campus of its own district.

The Peralta district is governed by a seven-member board of trustees elected by the public within the district boundaries. Two student members sit on the board but only have "advisory votes".

In June 2021, the contract for interim chancellor Jackson was extended through June 2022. In October 2023, the board of trustees selected Tammeil Gilkerson to be the permanent chancellor starting in January 2024.

== Governance ==
The Peralta Community College District is governed by an elected seven-member board of trustees. The board meets twice a month with meetings open to the public and broadcast live on local radio, television stations, Peralta Colleges Television (PCTV), and Peralta's YouTube Channel.

== Chancellors ==
- John W. Dunn (1964–1971)
- Clem Long (1971–1973)
- Thomas Fryer (1973–1978)
- Mav Tadlock (1978–1980)
- David Godhold (1980–1987)
- Armen Sarafian (1987–1988)
- Robert Scanell (1989–1995)
- A.J. Harrison (1995–1999)
- Ronald J. Temple (1999–2004)
- Elihu M. Harris (2004–2010)
- Wise Allen (2010–2012)
- Jose M. Ortiz (2012–2015)
- Jowel C. Lagurerre (2015–2019)
- Frances White (2019)
- Regina Stanback Stroud (2019–2020)
- Carla Walter (2020–2021)
- Jannett Jackson (2021–2023)
- Tammeil Gilkerson (2024–present)

== See also ==
- Elihu Harris
- Carole Ward Allen
