= Accrediting Commission for Community and Junior Colleges =

University accreditation organization in the US

- Abbreviation: ACCJC
- Formation: 1962
- Purpose: Higher education accreditation
- Headquarters: Novato, California, United States
- Region served: California, Hawaii, American Samoa, Guam, Marshall Islands, Micronesia, Northern Mariana Islands, Palau
- Website: www.accjc.org

The Accrediting Commission for Community and Junior Colleges (ACCJC) is an accrediting organization in the United States. It accredits private and public colleges that provide students two-year education programs and confer the associate degree. Formerly one of the nation's seven regional accreditors, the commission accredits colleges in California, Hawaii, and American territories and protectorates in the Pacific Ocean.

ACCJC was formed in 1962 when several accrediting agencies joined to create the Western Association of Schools and Colleges (WASC). In 2012 and 2013, the three commissions of WASC separated into independent organizations. ACCJC is not a governmental entity but an independent organization of educators and others representing the public interest. In concept, colleges apply to become members of the ACCJC and volunteer to participate in the accreditation process.

== The accreditation process ==
The accreditation process is premised on the idea that ACCJC and the colleges together shape the values and best practices of the educational community into the policies, requirements, and standards by which colleges are evaluated. The commission's intent is that ACCJC and its member institutions share this right and responsibility.

ACCJC requires member colleges to carry out a self-study, compose a report, and undergo peer review every six years. In short, ACCJC process consists of two elements: the college's evaluation of itself and ACCJC's evaluation of the college. These evaluations determine the extent to which the college is meeting ACCJC's policies, requirements, and standards, and their purpose is to help the school improve itself. However, while ACCJC and its representatives are considered peers of the college they are evaluating, ultimately it is ACCJC, not the college, that will decide the college's accreditation status and any subsequent steps the college must take to better this status.

=== The self-study ===
The self-study is an extensive research project by which the college examines itself and makes plans for improvement in the context of ACCJC's policies, eligibility requirements, and standards. ACCJC maintains dozens of policies, including "Review of Commission Actions." There are twenty-one eligibility requirements, ranging from ""Authority (to Operate as an Educational Institution)" to "Relations with the Accrediting Commission." There are four areas of standards: "Institutional Mission and Effectiveness," "Student Learning Programs and Services," "Resources," and "Leadership and Guidance." The standards state the practices of an "effective institution." The ACCJC considers an institution effective when it "ensures that its resources and processes support student learning, continually assesses that learning, and pursues institutional excellence and improvement." ACCJC emphasizes that this self-study must have the widespread involvement of faculty, staff, administration, students, and trustees to ensure that its conclusions are accurate and authoritative, reflecting the college as it is and projecting the college it wants to become.

=== The self-study report ===
The college composes and organizes the self-study report, which typically runs several hundred pages or more, along the lines of ACCJC's policies, requirements, and standards. The bulk of the report is the college's discussion of its adherence to the standards. Here the college must provide a summary of current processes and products, an analysis of the extent to which the college meets the standards, and evidence to support the summary and analysis. When pertinent, the college also adds "planning agendas" to guide its self-improvement. It then submits this report to ACCJC in preparation for ACCJC sending a "visiting" team to the site to "validate" the college's account of itself. Participants on the visiting team are volunteers drawn from other ACCJC member colleges.

=== The site visit ===
The visiting team examines evidence, conducts interviews, and attends meetings of college committees and councils. When the team is done with its work, it delivers a preliminary oral exit report to the college. Subsequently, the team composes the written team report, which it delivers in draft form both to ACCJC and to the college. This draft includes the visiting team's commendations and recommendations for addressing deficiencies. The college has the opportunity to correct factual errors in this report before it is considered a final draft.

=== Commission action ===
On the basis of the college's self-study report, the site team's visit, the site team's report, documents from previous evaluations, and evidence of student learning and achievement, the nineteen-member Commission determines the accreditation status of the college. It announces this status to the college in an action letter and to the public through ACCJC announcements. This action letter also lists the Commission's "official" recommendations. For a college seeking reaffirmation, there are in general two possibilities. ACCJC can reaffirm the college's accreditation, or it can sanction the college. The sanctions are of three kinds: Warning, Probation, and Show Cause. If sanctioned, the college maintains its accreditation, but ACCJC withholds reaffirmation until the college addresses the matters that led to sanction. ACCJC will also require the sanctioned college to provide one or more follow-up reports to confirm that it is in fact fulfilling the Commission's recommendations. Often the ACCJC will also require follow-up site visits. Very rarely does ACCJC terminate a college's accreditation.

ACCJC generated 89% of all sanctions issued nationwide between 2003 and 2008. From June 2011 to June 2012, ACCJC issued 64% of the seventy-five sanctions issued nationwide.

A grant for $450,000 from the Lumina Foundation to "explore the usefulness of the Degree Qualifications Profile (DQP)" was received by ACCJC.

=== Additional reports ===
In between these comprehensive self-studies, which occur every six years, the college provides ACCJC a midterm report, in which the college describes and analyzes its progress on each of the commission's recommendations, its self-identified planning agendas, and any proposed "substantive changes."

Colleges also submit to ACCJC annual reports on student learning and achievement and on fiscal matters.

== Relationship with California Community College system ==
On July 2, 2012, the ACCJC gave the City College of San Francisco (CCSF) eight months to prove it should remain accredited and ordered it to "make preparations for closure". As summarized by the San Francisco Chronicle in 2015, "the commission has never found wrongdoing or substandard instruction, but has said the college should lose accreditation because of tangled governance structures, poor fiscal controls and insufficient self-evaluation and reporting." In September 2012, the state chancellor's office warned that a special trustee would be appointed to oversee the institution's finances if the college did not voluntarily invite one; the board of trustees voted to invite a special trustee, despite student protests and objection. A report issued by California's Fiscal Crisis & Management Assistance team in September 2012 found the institution to be in a "perilous financial position" caused largely by "poor decisions and a lack of accountability.

In July 2013, the ACCJC elected to take action to terminate the college's accreditation, subject to a one-year review and appeal period. The decision was based on a variety of deficiencies in standards. A Fiscal Crisis and Management Assistance Team report was expected to be released by the end of July 2013. San Francisco city attorney Dennis Herrera filed two legal challenges to stop the ACCJC from revoking City College of San Francisco's accreditation alleging conflicts of interest, a faulty evaluation process, and a politically motivated decision-making process. The California Federation of Teachers (CFT), the union representing CCSF faculty, also submitted a complaint to the U.S. Department of Education (DOE). On August 13, 2013, the DOE sided with the union in four of its complaints, finding ACCJC in violation of federal regulations concerning its accreditation process.

In January 2015, with the legal conflict still ongoing, the ACCJC said that CCSF remained out of compliance with standards in 32 areas but granted the college a two-year extension for resolving these issues and avoiding a shutdown.

In August 2015, a task force convened by the state chancellor issued a report declaring that its system and colleges "have lost confidence in the ACCJC." Chancellor Brice Harris proposed a change to the California Code of Regulations that would remove the ACCJC as the sole accrediting commission for California community colleges. On November 16, 2015, the California community college system Board of Governors voted 14-0, with one abstention, to direct Chancellor Harris to create a plan to replace ACCJC as the accreditor for the system.

In 2017, the ACCJC reaffirmed CCSF's accreditation for seven years. By California regulation as of October 1, 2021, the ACCJC remains the sole accreditor for California community colleges.
