= Arthur (2011 film) =

2011 film by Jason Winer

- Theatrical release poster
- Directed by: Jason Winer
- Screenplay by: Peter Baynham
- Story by: Steve Gordon
- Based on: Arthur by Steve Gordon
- Produced by: Larry Brezner; Kevin McCormick; Chris Bender; Michael Tadross
- Starring: Russell Brand; Helen Mirren; Greta Gerwig; Jennifer Garner
- Cinematography: Uta Briesewitz
- Edited by: Brent White
- Music by: Theodore Shapiro; Mark Ronson
- Production companies: MBST Entertainment; BenderSpink; Langley Park Productions
- Distributed by: Warner Bros. Pictures
- Release date: April 8, 2011
- Running time: 110 minutes
- Country: United States
- Language: English
- Budget: $40 million
- Box office: $48.1 million

Arthur is a 2011 American romantic comedy film written by Peter Baynham and directed by Jason Winer. It is a remake of the 1981 film of the same name written and directed by Steve Gordon. Its story follows Arthur, a wealthy and alcoholic philanderer who, after a drunken run in with the law, is forced by his mother to marry Susan, a suitable spouse, or else he will be stripped of his inheritance. But things suddenly become complicated once he meets and falls in love with a free-spirited woman named Naomi. It stars Russell Brand, Helen Mirren, and Jennifer Garner.

The film was produced and distributed by Warner Bros. Pictures and was released on April 8, 2011. It grossed $12.2 million during its opening weekend and $48.1 million worldwide against a budget of $40 million. It received generally negative reviews from critics, who labelled it as unnecessary.

== Plot ==
Boozy Arthur Bach and his chauffeur, Bitterman, dress up in Batman and Robin costumes for a formal dinner hosted by Arthur's mother, Vivienne. The dinner is intended to announce Arthur as the new chairman of her corporation, Bach Worldwide. Driving to the dinner in a Batmobile, an intoxicated Arthur is chased by police, arrested and released the next day.

Vivienne arranges a marriage between Arthur and Susan Johnson, the daughter of another wealthy businessman, to ensure stable leadership and help Arthur's reputation. Arthur initially refuses (citing that he and Susan have nothing in common for a loveless relationship), but is told that he will be cut off from his $950 million inheritance if he does not marry Susan. He reluctantly agrees, and eventually asks Susan's father, Burt Johnson, for permission to marry. Burt agrees, after forcing Arthur against a table saw and warning him not to embarrass Susan.

In the meantime Arthur has met and wooed Naomi Quinn, an illegal tour guide to whom he has become attracted because of her free-spirited nature. He arranges his wedding while sneaking around on dates with Naomi. Arthur's nanny, Lillian Hobson – who normally dislikes all of Arthur's choices in women – gets to know and likes Naomi. Arthur learns that Naomi would like to have her children's book about the Statue of Liberty published. He attempts to find employment and other options so that he will be able to keep seeing Naomi and not need the inheritance, but to no avail.

Hobson takes Arthur to an Alcoholics Anonymous meeting, where Arthur complains that it is depressing and makes him want to drink. He proclaims he is going to drink, unintentionally brags about his wealth, and turns to leave the meeting. Hobson stands up and takes the bullet, giving Arthur's humiliating introduction in his place. Arthur, touched, states that if only she would do his drinking for him as well, he would be set.

Arthur goes to see Naomi at her house and tells her the truth – that he is engaged to Susan. Naomi then tells him to leave. Back home, Arthur calls for Hobson, only for Bitterman to come and tell him that she is in bed with a headache. Later, Hobson goes to Naomi and asks her to give Arthur another chance, but she again falls ill and is taken to a hospital. Naomi calls Arthur to tell him what has happened. He comes to the hospital, meets Naomi and is about to make up with her, but Susan arrives and tells Naomi that Arthur has bought the company that is handling the publication of her book. Upset, Naomi leaves the hospital. Hobson comes home and Arthur takes care of her. The two begin to get along better. However, a few days later, Hobson dies in her sleep and Arthur reverts to alcohol to numb the pain of her death, losing Naomi, and being married to Susan.

At his wedding, Arthur gets drunk and finds Hobson's last letter to him in which she advises him to follow his heart. Arthur decides, during the vows, not to proceed with the marriage. Susan and her father become belligerent and begin punching him, while also revealing in front of Vivienne that she is only marrying Arthur because she wants to take over Vivienne's family business. Vivienne stops the ruckus, but reminds Arthur of the agreed-upon disinheritance if he pursues Naomi. Arthur strips nearly naked to emphasize that he wants no kind of dependency on his mother's money and runs to Naomi's apartment. He tells her that he just lost his mum (meaning Hobson, not Vivienne) but Naomi, still upset with him, says she can't replace Hobson and refuses any prospect of their getting back together.

Six months later, Arthur is now sober. He has got back his inheritance because he is managing the company's charity, and his mother is proud of him for finally taking something seriously (possibly indicating his love for Naomi). He goes to a bookshop to buy Naomi's book – which she has dedicated to him – and sees an advertisement for a book-reading she will be giving at the New York Public Library. Arthur goes to the library and, this time, Naomi takes him back. The two leave the library and Bitterman drives them through New York in the Batmobile with the police following in pursuit.

== Cast ==
- Russell Brand as Arthur Bach – a childish man who is to marry Susan in order to receive his $950 million inheritance, but ends up falling in love with Naomi.
- Helen Mirren as Lillian Hobson – Arthur's nanny who acts like a mother to Arthur and has been looking after Arthur since he was a child due to Vivienne being too busy with the family business.
- Jennifer Garner as Susan Johnson – the woman Arthur is supposed to marry in order to get his inheritance.
- Greta Gerwig as Naomi Quinn – a free-spirited tour guide and Arthur's true love interest.
- Luis Guzmán as Bitterman – Arthur's chauffeur and best friend.
- Nick Nolte as Burt Johnson – Susan's father.
- Geraldine James as Vivienne Bach – Arthur's mother and the owner of Bach Worldwide, who will give her son his inheritance only if he marries Susan.
- Evander Holyfield as himself
- Murphy Guyer as Officer Kaplan
- Jennie Eisenhower as Alexis
- Christina Calph as Tiffany
- John Hodgman as Dylan's Candy Bar Store Manager
- Scott Adsit as Gummy Bear Man
- Nigel Barker as himself

== Production ==
In December 2008, Warner Bros. announced they were developing a remake of the 1981 film with Russell Brand to play the title character. The role was originally offered to Ricky Gervais, but he declined. In February 2009 it was announced that Peter Baynham, the writer of Borat, was working on a script.

In March 2010 it was announced that Jason Winer, best known for directing episodes of Modern Family, was chosen as director, making it his first feature film. Helen Mirren, who had previously worked with Brand in The Tempest (2010), joined the cast in April. Greta Gerwig was cast as Arthur's love interest in May, with Nick Nolte and Jennifer Garner joining the following month.

Filming took place in the spring and summer of 2010 at locations in and around New York City including St. Bartholomew's Church on Park Avenue, a location used in the original 1981 version of the film. Re-shoots took place in the winter months of 2011. Arthur Bach's penthouse is supposedly atop the Pierre Hotel on 2 East 61st Street, the famed 5-star hotel on the East Side, but the interior was created in the studio. The Daily News Building at 220 East 42nd Street was used as the headquarters of Bach Industries. The scenes in which Arthur first meets Naomi while she is conducting a tour as well as their first date were filmed at Grand Central Terminal. The scenes of Arthur working in a candy store were filmed at Dylan's Candy Bar, a New York City candy store founded by New Yorker Dylan Lauren, the daughter of Ralph Lauren.

The character Arthur's excessive drinking was central to the film's plot, but Brand – a recovering drug addict and alcoholic – said this was not an issue for him during production. Brand said that before scenes he would sniff alcohol to remind him of what it was like to be drunk.

Russell Brand's clothing in the film was inspired by Lapo Elkann.

In November 2023, a woman who had been previously cast as an extra in Arthur filed a lawsuit against Warner Bros. accusing Brand of exposing himself before he sexually assaulted her in 2010. In 2025, Warner Bros. Discovery provided outtakes from the film to the court as evidence in the case.

== Reception ==
=== Box office ===
Arthur was a box office disappointment. It finished third in the U.S. box office following its first week of release with an intake of $12,222,756 from 3,276 screens. It had its UK premiere at the O2 in London on 19 April. At the end of its 28-day release, the film earned $32,854,846 in the United States and $12,710,000 in other markets, for a worldwide total of $45,735,397. It was released at the same time as Hop, which also featured Russell Brand.

=== Critical response ===
Arthur was poorly received by critics. On the review aggregator website Rotten Tomatoes, 27% of 193 critics' reviews are positive, with an average rating of 4.4/10. The website's consensus reads: "An irritating, unnecessary remake that demonstrates the libertine charm Russell Brand exudes in supporting roles turn against him when he's star of the show." Metacritic, which uses a weighted average, assigned the film a score of 36 out of 100, based on 37 critics, indicating "generally unfavorable" reviews. Audiences polled by CinemaScore gave it a "B" grade.

The Houston Chronicle wrote a scathing review of Brand's performance, stating "Make no mistake, people are going to hate Brand in this." However, Thelma Adams of Us Weekly called it "a laugh-out-loud romp – and [Russell Brand's] best screen role to date." Cinemablend stated that "despite all the odds against him, [Russell Brand] proved himself as a winning movie presence".

Roger Ebert gave the film three out of four stars, stating that the film "is a fairly close remake of the great 1981 Dudley Moore movie, with pleasures of its own." Richard Roeper also enjoyed the film, giving it a "B", and, although he thought parts of the film were difficult to understand, said, "The new Arthur is a likable comedy with a good heart."

Brand later remarked that his choice to be in the lead role was "a mistake" and one of his most notable failures in life.

=== Accolades ===
- 2011 Teen Choice Awards
  - Choice Movie: Actor Comedy – Russell Brand (nominated)
- 32nd Golden Raspberry Awards
  - Worst Actor – Russell Brand (nominated)
  - Worst Prequel, Remake, Rip-off or Sequel (nominated)
