= J.G. Melon =

Restaurant in Manhattan, New York, U.S.

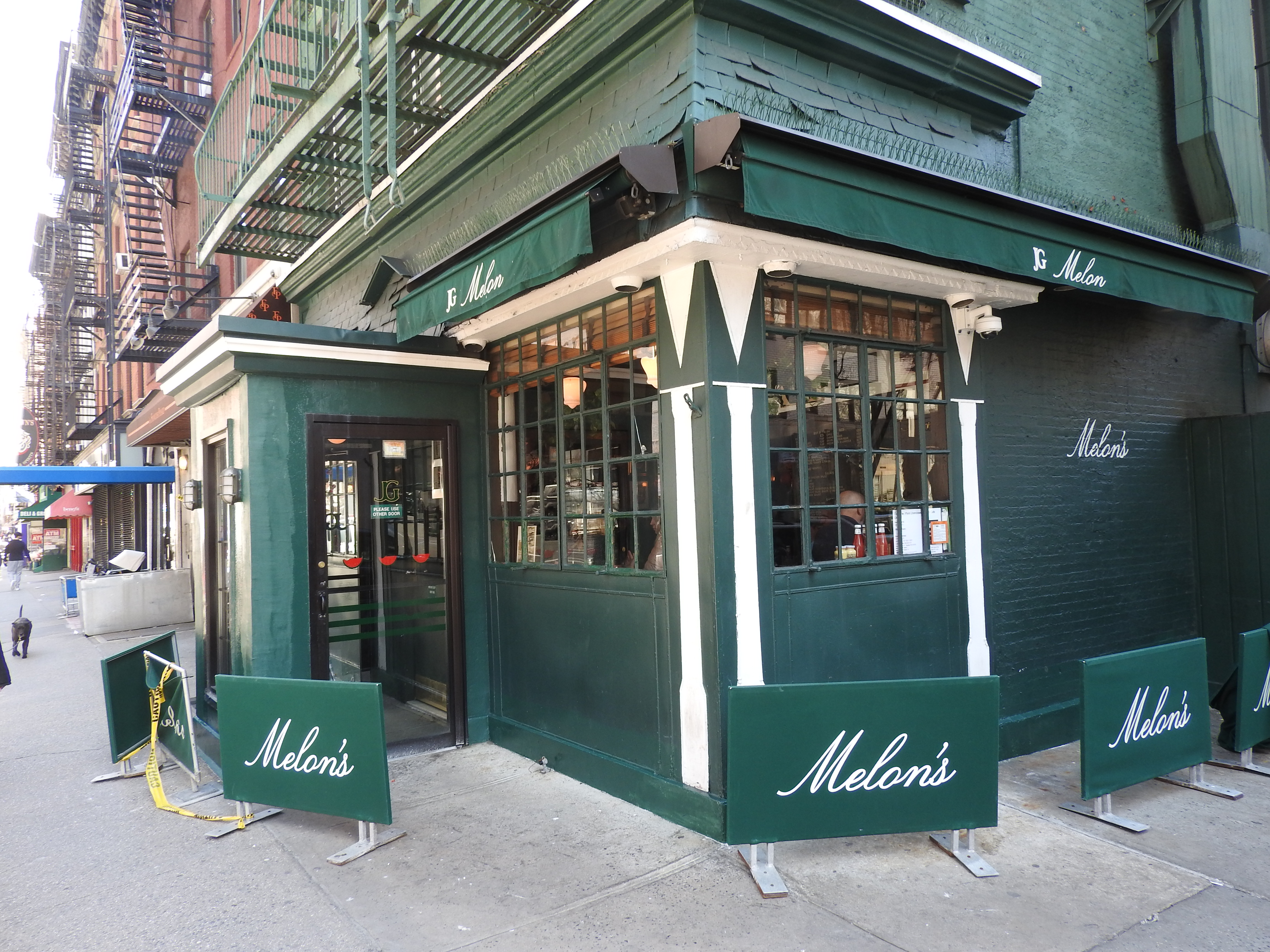
- J.G. Melon on the Upper East Side
- Interactive map of J.G. Melon

Restaurant information
- Established: 1972; 54 years ago Building constructed in 1868; 158 years ago
- Owners: O'Neill and Mourges heirs
- Food type: Flat-top griddle burgers, round-cut cottage fries, American pub fare
- Dress code: Preppy
- Location: 1291 Third Avenue (on East 74th Street), Upper East Side, Manhattan, New York City, New York, U.S.
- Coordinates: 40.771093°N 73.959423°W
- Seating capacity: 15 tables indoors, plus outdoor seating
- Reservations: No reservations
- Other information: Cash only; Hours are: Mon-Sat: 11:30am to 3am (Mon-Thurs kitchen closes at 2:30am; Fri & Sat kitchen closes at 2:40am); Sunday: 11:30am to 1am (kitchen closes at 12:40am)
- Website: jgmelon-nyc.com

J.G. Melon is an American restaurant established in 1972. It is located at 1291 Third Avenue on the northeast corner of East 74th Street, on the Upper East Side of Manhattan in New York City. It is known for its hamburgers.

The restaurant operates out of a historic five-story brick rowhouse painted hunter green, originally built in 1868. The site served as an illicit speakeasy during Prohibition, and later for decades as the Central Tavern.

== History ==
J.G. Melon's corner building, a five-story brick rowhouse, was built in 1868. In 1900, it housed a delicatessen. In the 1920s, it became a tavern of the local Jacob Ruppert Brewery to dispense its own products as an illicit speakeasy during Prohibition. Then, for decades the space was a neighborhood Irish bar run by two Italians, called Central Tavern.

J.G. Melon was established in 1972 by original owners Jack O'Neill and George Mourges, the "J" and "G" of J.G. Melon. They had been bartenders at the Manhattan restaurant Joe Allen (which had, in turn, been opened by a P. J. Clarke's maître d' named Joe Allen).

The "Melon" in the restaurant's name was inspired by a tiny watercolor painting of a cantaloupe melon left hanging on the wall by the prior tenant that they found upon their arrival; the restaurant had been stripped of everything else other than the dark wood bar. Mourges died in 2000 (the Mourges heirs are co-owners), and O'Neill passed away in 2016.

The neon sign of J.G. Melon

The corner restaurant is in a brick tenement painted hunter green, with a two-story-high T-shaped neon sign. A New York Times review of the novel on which the 2025 drama film & Sons was based, noted how "Anyone who’s spent a few formative years in Manhattan (particularly on the Upper East Side) will experience piquant shocks of recognition: ... 'the way a landmark like J. G. Melon abides like a poetic motif over the years, with its green facade and 'slice of red neon that seemed forever reflected in rainwater.'"

The restaurant's decor mostly consists of pictures, paintings, sketches, sculptures, and carvings of watermelons jam-packed everywhere, along chocolate-brown wood-paneled walls. New York Magazine wrote that "is melon kitsch décor makes this local landmark look like it opened back in 1932. Under a pressed-tin ceiling and dim yellowed lighting .. [with a] narrow, old-time bar and [semi-open, miniature] kitchen [that] take up most of the front room" while customers sit in the back. The dark wood bar sits just a few feet from the small kitchen. The little tables have green-and-white gingham tablecloths, which have never changed. The bartenders wear white shirts with their sleeves rolled up, and watermelon ties.

When Bobby Torre, J.G. Melon's maitre d' for over half a century, was asked how long a wait would be, Torre was given to answering: "Forty minutes, with connections." He was known for enforcing the restaurant's rules by, over the years, sending luminaries including New York City's billionaire mayor Michael Bloomberg to the restaurant's jukebox, bar, or sidewalk to wait their turn. Actress and Princess of Monaco Grace Kelly had to wait an hour at the bar for a table, which she did while drinking a Heineken out of the bottle. Torre passed away in 2025.

Cash is the only accepted method of payment.

=== Summer satellite, sister location, and franchises ===
O'Neill and Mourges also operated a J.G. Melon restaurant in Bridgehampton, New York, in the summers from 1976 until the 1980s. In addition, they ran a sister J.G. Melon restaurant at 340 Amsterdam Avenue on the Upper West Side in Manhattan from 1977 to 1993.

In 2015 a satellite location was opened through a franchising deal, in which the J.G. Melon name was licensed, at 89 MacDougal Street in Greenwich Village by Magnolia Bakery owner Steve Abrams, his brother Danny, and 30-year Melon alum Shaun Young. Except for Magnolia Bakery desserts, the menu was almost identical, including the guarded formula for the iconic hamburger. From 2017 to 2019, another location was operated as a franchise by the Abrams brothers, at 480 Amsterdam Avenue on the Upper West Side.

== Burger ==
The New York Times described its hamburger as follows: "This is a big, beefy, no-nonsense, cooked-on-a-flattop burger. [It] emphasize[s] crustiness and juiciness, and skipping the grill in lieu of a ... flattop means there’s no smoky overshadowing of the pure beefiness." Eater opined that "The rippled cottage fries are the classic accompaniment, and draft beer is the drink of choice."

British food writer Nick Solares described it as follows: "The hamburger ... is a plump and juicy, seven and a quarter ounce, griddle-cooked patty served ... on a [toasted] squishy white bun. It is in many ways the platonic ideal of a bar burger. No mess, no fuss, just meat and bread ... on a plate with pickles and onions on the side....The patty comes impressively seared with dense, dark crust rife with the browned meat flavors of the Maillard reaction. The interior, while not as abundantly juicy as more modern burgers, is still pleasingly succulent, and texturally the patty is so loosely packed that you wonder if it was even formed into a patty before cooking."

== Critical reception ==
In 2006, Alan Richman, the food correspondent for GQ magazine, included the J.G. Melon burger in his list of "The 20 Hamburgers You Must Eat Before You Die." That year, Gael Greene praised its food for its traditional, unpretentious execution.

In 2015, New York Times restaurant critic Pete Wells called J.G. Melon's signature menu item a "plain, sturdy and hunger-calming burger" that successfully conjures the feeling of old New York. In 2013, 2014, 2015, and subsequent years, the restaurant was named a Michelin Bib Gourmand.

In 2016, The New York Times described it as "the popular restaurant and bar known for succulent hamburgers," and in 2017 as "[the] classic pub, long known for burgers." That year, food writer Nick Solares wrote for Eater that it is "one of NYC’s quintessential bars."

In 2017, Condé Nast Traveler listed the restaurant as one of "The 49 U.S. Restaurants We'd Travel For," with a nod to its burger, after asking its network of writers, chefs, and restaurateurs "what dishes they can’t stop dreaming about." That year, Bon Appétit named it one of "The 14 Most Iconic New York City Bars and Restaurants."

In 2019, chef Brad Leone of Bon Appétit said of the restaurant's signature offering: "It is a fantastic burger."

In 2025, J.G. Melon was added as a recommended restaurant in that year's Michelin Guide. In 2026, its burger was listed by Eater in the "The Best Burgers in New York City, According to Eater Editors."

== In film ==
A tense crucial scene with Meryl Streep and Dustin Hoffman, in which Dustin Hoffman smacks his wine glass against the wall, was filmed at the restaurant for the 1979 Academy Award for Best Picture legal divorce drama film Kramer vs. Kramer. A still of the scene from the movie hangs on the wall next to the table where it was shot.

Steve Gordon wrote his Oscar-nominated screenplay for the 1981 romantic comedy Arthur while sitting at his regular table at J.G. Melon.

There is also a scene shot at J.G. Melon in Whit Stillman's1990 preppy cult classic romantic comedy-drama Metropolitan, which was nominated for Best Original Screenplay at the 63rd Academy Awards. The restaurant required that those who filmed the movies had to be in by 3 o'clock, and out by 7 o'clock.

== Notable patrons ==
- Michael Bloomberg, billionaire and former New York City Mayor, who calls J.G. Melon hamburgers the "best hamburgers in the world.”
- Jerry Seinfeld, comedian and actor, is a regular who praises the restaurant.
- Gigi Hadid, model, who opined that J.G. Melon has the best burgers in New York during an interview on The Tonight Show Starring Jimmy Fallon.
- Bobby Flay, Food Network host and chef, who calls J.G. Melon the best hamburger joint in the city.
- Ina Garten, chef and television host of the Food Network program Barefoot Contessa, who included the restaurant on her curated list of favorite New York City dining destinations.
- Danny Meyer, restaurateur (Eleven Madison Park), who lists J.G. Melon's hamburger as one of the best in New York City.
- Brooke Shields, actress, has been a regular
- Dylan McDermott, actor, whose father was a longtime J.G. Melon bartender.
- Andrew Zimmern, Travel Channel host and chef, who said that if he were forced to choose, Melons would be his "last burger ever".

=== Past patrons ===
- John F. Kennedy Jr., son of the U.S. President John F. Kennedy and First Lady Jacqueline Kennedy, businessman and attorney, was a regular at the bar
- Grace Kelly, was an actress and Princess of Monaco, and was a regular.
- Sam Shepard, actor and playwright, was a regular at the bar
- Billy Martin, was the manager of the New York Yankees, and was a regular
- Gerald Ford, then the President of the United States, asked how he heard about the restaurant, said: "I asked my friends where to go in New York for a hamburger, and they all told me J.G. Melon."

== See also ==
- List of hamburger restaurants
- List of restaurants in New York City
