= The Hamptons: Food, Family, and History =

2012 cookbook by Ricky Lauren

- Author: Ricky Lauren
- Language: English
- Subject: Cookbook
- Genre: Non-fiction
- Publisher: Houghton Mifflin Harcourt
- Publication date: 2012
- Publication place: United States
- Media type: Book
- ISBN: 978-1-118-29327-0

The Hamptons: Food, Family, and History is a cookbook written by Ricky Lauren in 2012. It also shares the life of the Lauren family in photographs and stories.

== Background ==
Ricky Lauren and Ralph Lauren were married in 1964 and lived in Southampton, New York in a converted barn. They spent the summers on Long Island. The Laurens had two homes in Amagansett, from which Ralph commuted into New York City and a home in East Hampton. While in East Hampton, the family lived alongside a farmer's field, and picked vegetables and fruit for their dinner. In each place that they lived, Lauren was inspired by the locale, which resulted in different recipes and ways of entertaining.

They now have a house in Montauk, on a cliff that overlooks a bird sanctuary.

== The book ==
We would stroll to the field in the late afternoons after the heat of the day had passed. The children brought little brown bags with them, and we would collect our bounty. For the children, it was like a treasure hunt.

— Ricky Lauren

The cookbook contains recipes that Lauren has been collecting since she was married. Many of the recipes are based on local seasonal foods. The book shares stories of her life with her husband and their children—Andrew, David, and Dylan—through anecdotes, photographs, and favorite recipes.

The book contains 130 recipes which are divided into four sections based upon the places that they have lived on Long Island. For instance, in the East Hampton section, there are recipes for country chicken chili, cold poached salmon, and mixed berry apple and oat muffins.

In addition to recipes, the book provides ideas about entertainment, like creating a "perfect atmosphere for a barbecue". However, Lauren says, "The Hamptons is about taking advantage of the natural setting. Keep things simple, entertain outdoors, seek out fresh produce in farm markets if you can. Enjoy the unique natural beauty and bounty with friends and family wherever you live.".

The book also contains stories about the culture and history of the Hamptons, like its artists, authors, and architects.

Publishers Weekly says of the book, "Equally enticing [as the recipes in the book] are the snippets into the surprisingly unaffected everyday life of this famous family—e.g., a favorite meal of humble London broil, rationing out Nana’s rum-laced brownies, and the many family photos in the book. Intimate, fun, and full of tasty offerings, readers will adopt many of these recipes and make their own family memories."

It also says that while the sections about where the family has lived on Long Island is meaningful to Lauren, it may be difficult for some to find recipes without reliance on the index.
