= Ricky Lauren =

American author and artist

- Born: Ricky Ann Loew-Beer; June 15, 1943 (age 83); New York City, U.S.
- Education: Hunter College
- Occupations: Author, artist, photographer
- Spouse: Ralph Lauren (m. 1964)
- Children: 3, including Dylan and David Lauren

Ricky Ann Lauren (née Loew-Beer; born June 15, 1943) is an American author, artist, photographer, and psychotherapist, and the wife of fashion designer Ralph Lauren.

== Early life ==
Born Ricky Ann Loew-Beer, she grew up in New York City. She is the daughter of Austrian immigrants, Margaret Vytouch and Rudolph Loew-Beer. Lauren was an English major at Hunter College. She met her future husband Ralph Lauren at the eye doctor's office where she was working part time. Lauren taught fifth grade and danced for a time in The Bronx. On December 20, 1964, she married Ralph Lauren in New York City. She is the daughter of a Jewish father and a Catholic mother.

== Career ==
=== Hostess, patron and fundraiser ===
The New York Times said Lauren has supported her husband's career as a "silent partner. These activities included attending fashion industry events or charities with him, hosting parties, and her patronage for charitable events. In 2000, she and her husband established a cancer center which is part of North General Hospital in Harlem. The couple also founded the Ralph and Ricky Lauren Center for the Performing Arts, which is located at the Lexington School for the Deaf, in New York City.

Lauren has been identified as the "Polo Persona", the model by which the Polo advertising campaigns are developed. Ralph said in his memoir: "I didn't like the girl with all the makeup and high heels. I liked the girl in jeans and a white shirt with rolled-up sleeves, wearing her boyfriend's jacket. That's the girl I am attracted to. That's the girl I married—Ricky." Ralph said that when he began designing women's clothes, his interest was piqued by his wife's frustration in finding clothes she would like that could fit her slim and petite build.

=== Psychotherapist ===
After her children were in school, Lauren returned to college, earned her degree, and then worked as a psychotherapist.

=== Author ===
Lauren is an author, artist and photographer best known for her lifestyle and cookbooks. One of her books is Cuisine, Lifestyle, and Legend of the Double RL Ranch, of which The New York Times says, "Here is a loving — and really beautiful — picture-book tribute (with history and recipes) to the spot near Telluride that spawned an empire built on denim shirts, tooled turquoise-buckle belts, and red-and-black horse blankets." It reflects her interest in a casual life style and simple Western-style cuisine. She wrote The Hamptons: Food, Family and History, which was well received by Publishers Weekly. Lauren wrote and illustrated "Safari" with her photographs from a 1983 trip to Africa. The proceeds of the leather-and canvas-bound book go to the World Wildlife Fund. She also wrote the book My Island in 1994.

== Personal life ==
Ricky and Ralph Lauren have three children, Andrew, David, and Dylan. (Note: She ensured that they had chores and helped her with activities like meal preparation and grocery shopping, to ensure that they had a down-to-earth lifestyle. Andrew (born 1969) is a film producer and actor. David (born 1971) is Executive Vice President of Global Advertising, Marketing, and Communications at Ralph Lauren Corporation. In September 2011, he married Lauren Bush, the granddaughter of former President George H. W. Bush. Dylan (born 1974) is owner of Dylan's Candy Bar in New York City. In June 2011, she married hedge fund manager, Paul Arrouet.) The Laurens lived in Southampton, New York, in a converted barn during the beginning of their marriage. They spent summers in Long Island. They had two houses in Amagansett, from which Ralph commuted into New York City, and then a house in East Hampton. She resides in New York City; Montauk, New York; Jamaica; and on the family owned Double RL Ranch beneath the San Juan Mountains outside Telluride, Colorado, that they bought in 1982.

Lauren studied photography after she was married.
