= YDL =

YDL may refer to:

- Yellow Dog Linux, an open source Linux distribution for the PowerPC
- Dease Lake Airport, the IATA airport code
- Youth Defense League, a New York Hardcore band
