= Arthur (1981 film) =

1981 film by Steve Gordon

- Theatrical release poster
- Directed by: Steve Gordon
- Written by: Steve Gordon
- Produced by: Robert Greenhut
- Starring: Dudley Moore; Liza Minnelli; John Gielgud
- Cinematography: Fred Schuler
- Edited by: Susan E. Morse
- Music by: Burt Bacharach
- Production company: Orion Pictures
- Distributed by: Warner Bros.
- Release date: July 17, 1981
- Running time: 97 minutes
- Country: United States
- Language: English
- Budget: $7 million
- Box office: $95.5 million

Arthur is a 1981 American romantic comedy film written and directed by Steve Gordon. It stars Dudley Moore as Arthur Bach, a drunken New York City millionaire who is on the brink of an arranged marriage to wealthy heiress Susan Johnson but ends up falling for Linda Marolla, a common working-class young woman from Queens. It was the sole film directed by Gordon, who died in 1982 of a heart attack at age 44.

The film received critical acclaim and earned $95.5 million domestically, making it the fourth highest-grossing film of 1981. Its title song, "Arthur's Theme (Best That You Can Do)", won the Academy Award for Best Original Song. Co-written by Christopher Cross, Burt Bacharach, Carole Bayer Sager, and Peter Allen, it was performed by Cross. Sir John Gielgud also won the Academy Award for Best Supporting Actor. It was nominated for two other Academy Awards for Best Actor for Moore and Best Original Screenplay for Gordon. The film's success led to a sequel in 1988 and a remake in 2011, neither of which replicated the success of the original film.

== Plot ==
Arthur Bach is a spoiled, alcoholic man-child in New York City, who likes to be driven in his chauffeured Rolls-Royce Silver Wraith limousine through Central Park. Arthur is heir to a portion of his family's vast fortune, but only if he marries the upper-class Susan Johnson, the daughter of Burt, a business acquaintance of his father Stanford. He does not love Susan, but his family feels that she will make him finally grow up. During a shopping trip in Manhattan, accompanied by his valet, Hobson, Arthur witnesses a young woman, Linda Marolla, shoplifting a necktie. He intercedes with the store security guard on her behalf, and later asks her for a date. Despite his attraction to Linda, Arthur remains pressured by his family to marry Susan.

While visiting his grandmother, Martha, Arthur shares his feelings for Linda, but is warned again that he will be disowned if he does not marry Susan. Hobson, who has been more like a father to him than Stanford has, realizes that Arthur is beginning to grow up, and secretly encourages Linda to attend Arthur's engagement party. Hobson confides in Linda that he senses Arthur loves her. Linda crashes the party, held at Stanford's estate, and she and Arthur eventually spend time alone together, which is tracked by both families. Hobson is later hospitalized, and Arthur rushes to his side, vowing to care for the person who has long cared for him. After several weeks, Hobson dies, and then Arthur, who has been sober the entire time, goes on a drinking binge. On his wedding day, he visits the diner where Linda works and proposes to her. At the church, he jilts Susan, resulting in Burt Johnson attempting to stab Arthur with a cheese knife, though he is prevented by Martha.

A wounded Arthur announces in church there will be no wedding, then passes out soon after. Later, Linda tends to his wounds, and they discuss living a life of poverty. A horrified Martha tells Arthur that he can have his fortune, because no Bach has ever been working class. Arthur declines, but at the last minute, he talks privately to Martha. When he returns to Linda's side, he tells her that he declined again – Martha's dinner invitation, he means – but he did accept $750 million. Arthur's pleased chauffeur Bitterman drives the couple through Central Park.

== Cast ==
- Dudley Moore as Arthur Bach
- Liza Minnelli as Linda Marolla
- John Gielgud as Hobson
- Geraldine Fitzgerald as Martha Bach
- Jill Eikenberry as Susan Johnson
- Stephen Elliott as Burt Johnson
- Ted Ross as Bitterman
- Barney Martin as Ralph Marolla
- Thomas Barbour as Stanford Bach
- Peter Evans as Preston
- Richard Hamilton as Bill
- Anne De Salvo as Gloria
- Irving Metzman as Security Guard
- Lou Jacobi as Plant Store Owner
- Justine Johnston as Aunt Pearl
- Paul Gleason as Executive
- Phyllis Somerville as Saleslady
- Raymond Serra as Racetrack Owner
- Lawrence Tierney as Man In Coffee Shop
- Mark Margolis as Wedding Guest (uncredited)

== Production ==
Steve Gordon wrote the screenplay while sitting at his regular table at the Upper East Side restaurant J.G. Melon in New York City. He originally wrote the title character Arthur Bach with an American actor in mind. Prior to the casting of Moore, Al Pacino, Jack Nicholson, John Travolta, Richard Dreyfuss, and James Caan were all considered for the role. In addition, Alec Guinness and David Niven were considered for the role of Hobson. John Belushi was also considered for Arthur. Initially, Gordon wanted Dudley Moore to perform the role with an American accent, but this proved contentious as Moore had trouble doing so and eventually convinced Gordon to let him use his natural English accent. While some critiques objected to the obvious difference in accent between Arthur and his biological father Stanford (Thomas Barbour), others were quick to catch the deeper implication that Hobson taught Arthur to speak.

In Gordon's original draft, the female lead (played in the final movie by Liza Minnelli as Linda Marolla) was originally written as Jewish, with the last name Davidorf. Linda was changed from Jewish to Italian-American before filming. Debra Winger reportedly turned down the role of Linda Marolla. Goldie Hawn, Diane Keaton, Gilda Radner, and Meryl Streep were also considered for the role of Linda.

Although the project was initially in the works at Paramount Pictures, studio executives eventually dropped the project and Orion Pictures stepped in. Promoting the film proved to be a challenge; reportedly six ad campaigns were discarded before a final one was decided upon.

=== Soundtrack ===
Christopher Cross was initially asked to score the film, but writer-director Steven Gordon did not feel comfortable with his lack of experience in composing for film and the job was given to Burt Bacharach. Cross was asked to compose a song for the film which he did, "Arthur's Theme (Best That You Can Do)", which he wrote with Bacharach along with Carole Bayer Sager and Peter Allen.

== Reception ==
The film had a disappointing opening at the box office but improved its performance over its run, becoming the seventh highest-grossing film of the summer. It eventually earned $95.5 million domestically, making it the fourth highest-grossing film of 1981.

The film received critical acclaim upon its release and is considered by many as one of the best films of 1981. On the review aggregator website Rotten Tomatoes, the film holds an approval rating of 86% based on 36 reviews, with an average rating of 7.2/10. The website's critics consensus reads, "Dudley Moore brings a boozy charm to Arthur, a coming of age tale for a wayward millionaire that deploys energetic cast chemistry and spiffy humor to jovial effect." Metacritic, which uses a weighted average, assigned the film a score of 69 out of 100, based on 12 critics, indicating "generally favorable" reviews.

Then-U.S. President Ronald Reagan viewed the film at Camp David on July 25, 1981.

=== Accolades ===
Award	Category	Nominee(s)	Result	Ref.
Academy Awards	Best Actor	Dudley Moore	Nominated	
Academy Awards	Best Supporting Actor	John Gielgud	Won	
Academy Awards	Best Screenplay – Written Directly for the Screen	Steve Gordon	Nominated	
Academy Awards	Best Original Song	"Arthur's Theme (Best That You Can Do)"; Music by Burt Bacharach; Lyrics by Carole Bayer Sager, Christopher Cross, and Peter Allen	Won	
American Movie Awards	Best Supporting Actor	John Gielgud	Won	
ASCAP Film and Television Music Awards	Most Performed Feature Film Standards	"Arthur's Theme (Best That You Can Do)"; Music by Burt Bacharach; Lyrics by Carole Bayer Sager, Christopher Cross, and Peter Allen	Won	
British Academy Film Awards	Best Supporting Artist	John Gielgud	Nominated	
British Academy Film Awards	Best Original Film Music	Burt Bacharach	Nominated	
Golden Globe Awards	Best Motion Picture – Musical or Comedy		Won	
Golden Globe Awards	Best Actor in a Motion Picture – Musical or Comedy	Dudley Moore	Won	
Golden Globe Awards	Best Actress in a Motion Picture – Musical or Comedy	Liza Minnelli	Nominated	
Golden Globe Awards	Best Supporting Actor – Motion Picture	John Gielgud	Won	
Golden Globe Awards	Best Original Song – Motion Picture	"Arthur's Theme (Best That You Can Do)"; Music by Burt Bacharach; Lyrics by Carole Bayer Sager, Christopher Cross, and Peter Allen	Won	
Grammy Awards	Record of the Year	"Arthur's Theme (Best That You Can Do)"; Christopher Cross and Michael Omartian	Nominated	
Grammy Awards	Song of the Year	"Arthur's Theme (Best That You Can Do)"; Peter Allen, Burt Bacharach, Christopher Cross, and Carole Bayer Sager	Nominated	
Grammy Awards	Best Pop Vocal Performance, Male	"Arthur's Theme (Best That You Can Do)" – Christopher Cross	Nominated	
Los Angeles Film Critics Association Awards	Best Supporting Actor	John Gielgud	Won	
New York Film Critics Circle Awards	Best Supporting Actor	John Gielgud	Won	
New York Film Critics Circle Awards	Best Screenplay	Steve Gordon	Runner-up	
Writers Guild of America Awards	Best Comedy – Written Directly for the Screen	Steve Gordon	Won	

=== Honors ===
The film was ranked No. 10 on Bravo's "100 Funniest Movies".

The film is recognized by American Film Institute in these lists:

- 2000: AFI's 100 Years...100 Laughs – No. 53
- 2004: AFI's 100 Years...100 Songs:
  - "Arthur's Theme (Best That You Can Do)" – No. 79

== Related films ==
=== Sequel ===
The film was followed by a sequel in 1988, Arthur 2: On the Rocks. Moore, Liza Minnelli and John Gielgud reprised their roles, as well as co-stars Stephen Elliott, Geraldine Fitzgerald, Barney Martin and Ted Ross. The sequel was a critical and financial failure.

=== Remake ===
The 2011 version was first reported in 2008 with news that Arthur was to be remade by Warner Bros. Pictures, with Russell Brand in the lead role. Brand confirmed this during his March 10, 2009, appearance on The Howard Stern Show. The remake was an overall critical and financial failure.

== In popular culture ==
The animated series The Critic starring Jon Lovitz has an episode "Eyes on the Prize", which shows a parody of Arthur called "Arthur 3: Revenge of the Liver", where the character of Arthur Bach (voiced by Maurice LaMarche impersonating Dudley Moore) is shown intoxicated and informed that he has cirrhosis of the liver.
