= Wes Joice =

American restaurateur and businessman

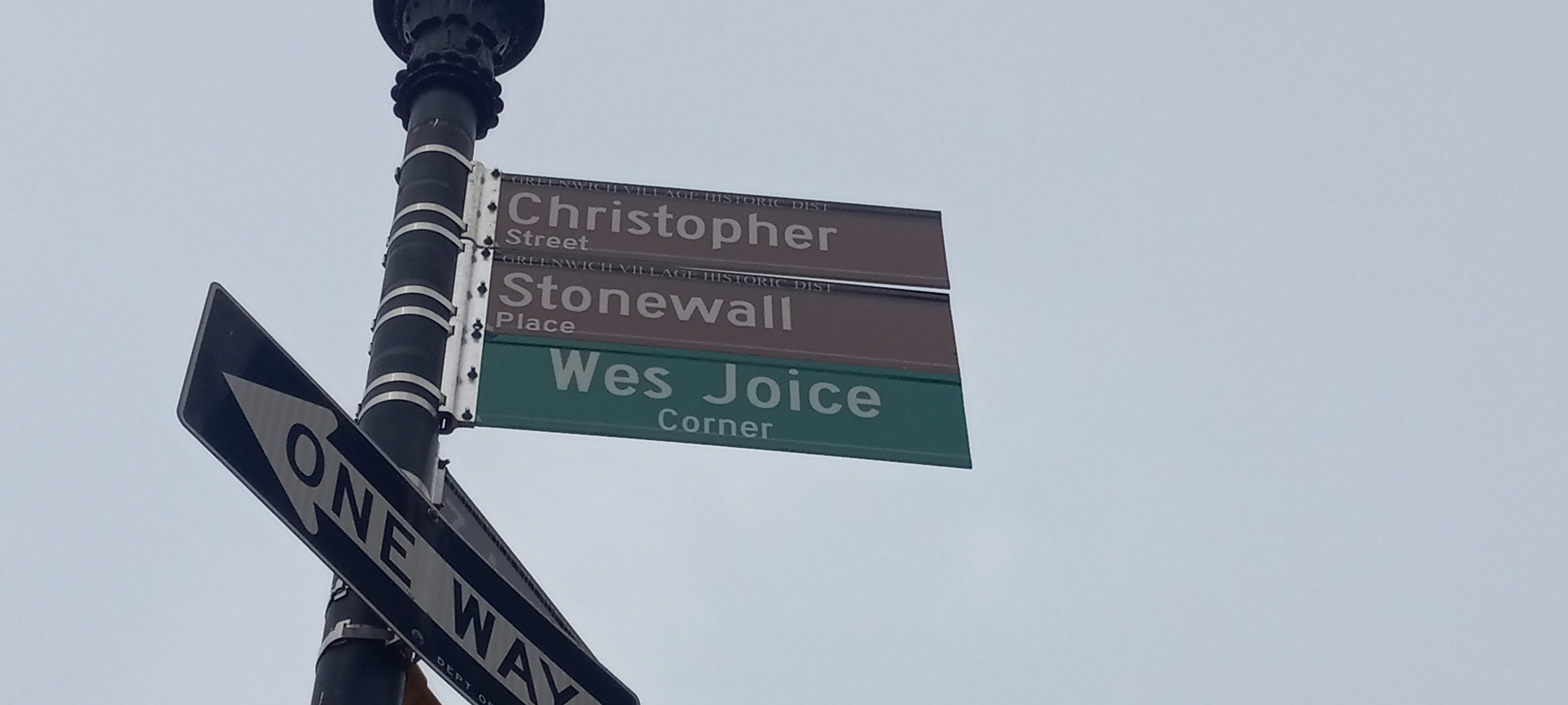
Sign for Wes Joice Corner in Greenwich Village.

John Wesley "Wes" Joice (October 22, 1931 – June 6, 1997) was the owner of the Greenwich Village's literary hangout, The Lion's Head (also called The Head), which he first opened in 1966 at 59 Christopher Street. A former minor league baseball player, policeman and P.J. Clarke's bartender, the establishment attracted writers and editors who spread the word. Joice filed for bankruptcy in 1994. The Lion's Head closed two years later, in 1996, due to rising rents.

The place became legendary as the location where:

- Lanford Wilson had scribbled a play on a napkin
- Rod Steiger picked up his mail
- Norman Mailer had planned his 1969 campaign for Mayor
- Pete Hamill had reportedly talked Robert F. Kennedy into running for the Senate
- Jessica Lange was once the second prettiest waitress on her shift

== Background ==
Joice, who was born in the Bronx, New York but raised in Chicago, was the son of the chairman of the Chicago Board of Trade. His surname was of Norwegian derivation, not Irish, as was often commonly assumed. Returning to the Bronx for high school, he would spend one year at Fordham University, three years in the Army in Korea, and two years with the New York Police Department, before becoming a publican, first as a bouncer at another pub, Downey's, and later as a bartender at P.J. Clarke's. Finally he became the proprietor of The Head.

== Last years ==
When Joice lost the pub to bankruptcy in January 1994, "he felt that he was losing a little piece of himself", said his widow, Judy. Joice's son, Maxwell Kane, said "My Dad was that restaurant."

== Death ==
Joice died from lung cancer in 1997, aged 65. In addition to his wife and son, he was also survived by three children from his first marriage, two children from his second marriage, and six grandchildren at the time of his death.

== Legacy ==
- Wes Joice Corner at Christopher Street and Seventh Avenue South
- New York City press release
