= Nick Solares =

British food writer (born 1968)

Nick Solares (born 1968) is a British food writer for Eater who began hosting The Meat Show in 2015. He is a self-proclaimed "professional carnivore".

== Biography ==
Solares' career in food writing began in 2006 when he published a food blog called Beef Aficionado. From 2007 to 2014, he worked as a photographer for Serious Eats. He reviewed hamburgers for "A Hamburger Today" blog as well as pizza for "Slice" blog. He also appeared on the Travel Channel show Burger Land in 2012.

In 2015, Solares began hosting The Meat Show for Eater video. The show reviewed meat cuisine from around the world, including restaurants such as Le Relais de Venise L'Entrecôte.

Solares was temporarily suspended from Eater in 2016 after it was discovered he was formerly affiliated with Youth Defense League, a right-wing skinhead Oi! band, in the 1980s. He issued a public apology in May that year.

In 2018, Solares hosted an event with chef Anthony Goncalves at The Ritz-Carlton New York, Westchester, which consisted of a four-course menu. Solares also started a new show called Meat Life.
