= The One and Only (1978 film) =

1978 comedy film by Carl Reiner

- Theatrical release poster
- Directed by: Carl Reiner
- Written by: Steve Gordon
- Produced by: David V. Picker
- Starring: Henry Winkler; Kim Darby; Gene Saks
- Cinematography: Victor J. Kemper
- Edited by: Bud Molin
- Music by: Patrick Williams
- Production company: First Artists
- Distributed by: Paramount Pictures
- Release date: 3 February 1978
- Running time: 97 minutes
- Country: United States
- Language: English
- Box office: $16,928,137 (USA)

The One and Only is a 1978 comedy film starring Henry Winkler, directed by Carl Reiner and written by Steve Gordon.

== Plot ==
At a midwestern college in 1951, student Mary Crawford has the combined good and bad fortune to meet Andy Schmidt, a remarkably conceited young man who is convinced that he is tremendously talented and has every intention of becoming a star. Andy wants Mary to marry him quickly before he becomes too famous to give her a second look. She cannot resist him and takes him home to Columbus, Ohio, to meet her straitlaced parents. Andy proceeds to annoy Mary's parents by hugging them, calling them "Tom and Mom" and interrupting dinner to do a series of impressions, thoroughly ruining the visit.

Mary and Andy elope and Mary moves with him to New York City, where he is certain that Broadway or Hollywood will beckon within a matter of weeks. Half a year passes and Andy gets nowhere. His ego is not bruised and he remains his same insufferable self. Mary takes an office job to support them. She gets pregnant and still loves her husband, but her parents are terribly worried for Mary and she has to ask them for money because Andy is not making any.

Andy does manage to make a friend, Milton Miller, a little person with a big ego. Milton, a struggling actor himself, tries to prove that he is a ladies' man, even to Mary's mother. After Milton tells Andy that he occasionally wrestles to make money, Andy tries professional wrestling as his new occupation. Though Andy doesn't have a wrestler's build, he behaves and dresses to create a character known as "The Lover" (a Gorgeous George type) who drives both opponents and audiences crazy. Andy earns thousands of fans.

== Cast ==
- Henry Winkler as Andy Schmidt
- Kim Darby as Mary Crawford
- Gene Saks as Sidney Seltzer
- William Daniels as Mr. Crawford
- Polly Holliday as Mrs. Crawford
- Brandon Cruz as Sherman Crawford
- Hervé Villechaize as Milton Miller
- Ed Begley Jr. as Arnold "The King"
- Harold Gould as Hector Moses
- Hard Boiled Haggerty as Captain Nemo
- Ralph Manza as Bellman
- Chavo Guerrero Sr. as Joe "Indian Joe"
- Mary Woronov as Arlene
- Dennis James as Cameo Role

== Reception ==
The film received mixed reviews from critics. Vincent Canby of the New York Times did not review the film positively, though he mentioned that he appreciated earlier works by Reiner: "The One and Only is more of that sort of safe, schmalzy comedy, but fatally lacking the presence of someone like the great George Burns." Roger Ebert of the Chicago Sun-Times gave it 2 1/2 out of 4 stars: "It's a pleasant movie, it has some genuinely funny moments."

On Rotten Tomatoes, the film holds a rating of 55% from 11 reviews.
