= Joe Allen (restaurant) =

American restaurant

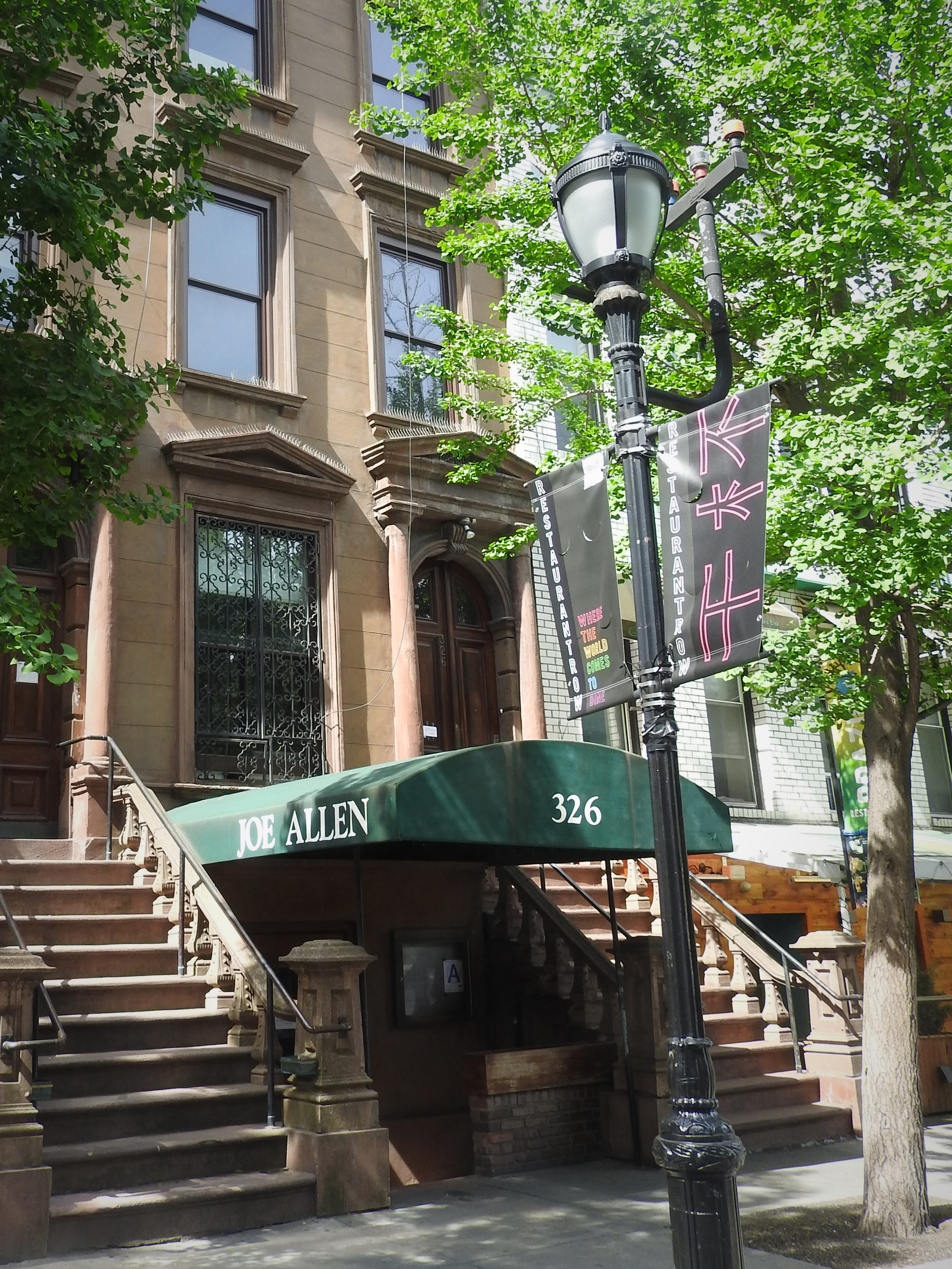
- The restaurant's exterior in 2020
- Interactive map of Joe Allen

Restaurant information
- Location: 326 West 46th Street, New York, New York, 10036, U.S.
- Coordinates: 40°45′36″N 73°59′21″W
- Website: joeallenrestaurant.com

Joe Allen is an American restaurant known as a Broadway meeting place for working actors, theater staff and fans – very much an industry institution. The restaurant is located on West 46th Street in Hell's Kitchen, Manhattan, and was opened in 1965 by a restaurateur of the same name.

Joe Allen is known for having its wall lined with posters of Broadway flops such as Laughing Room Only, Moose Murders, and Dance of the Vampires. The restaurant featured in scenes in the films No Way to Treat a Lady (1968) and Woody Allen's Melinda and Melinda (2004).

== History ==
The restaurant was opened in 1965. In 1972 two of its bartenders left and established the Upper East Side restaurant J.G. Melon; Jack O'Neill and George Mourges, the "J" and "G" of J.G. Melon.

A branch opened in the Les Halles district of Paris in 1972, and another in London's Covent Garden in 1977. Since 2018 these were acquired by different owners, but retained the name and, in the case of the London branch, the theatrical atmosphere at a venue 100 metres from its original location. In 2020, in response to the COVID-19 crisis, the London Joe Allen (under temporary closure due to the pandemic) launched a series of three online variety shows in order to raise funds both for the restaurant and the combined theatrical charities Acting For Others. Entitled "An Evening At Joe's", the hour-long shows, viewable on the Joe Allen YouTube channel, featured songs and sketches from West End and Broadway stars including Derek Jacobi, Chita Rivera, Gary Wilmot, Claire Moore, Sally Ann Triplett and Harriet Thorpe.

== Owner ==
The restaurateur Joe Allen, who gave the establishment its name, was born on February 20, 1933, and died on February 7, 2021, at the age of 87. He had opened the restaurant after having been the maître d' of the saloon and gastropub P. J. Clarke's. He was memorialised with three colourful tributes in The New York Times as a restaurateur of the old school who could usually be seen looking unassuming on a barstool at one of his outlets or another. Once, when asked to explain his success, he cited his diffidence. "Maybe it's because I don't inflict myself on the customers," he said.
