= Greg Lauren =

American actor and painter

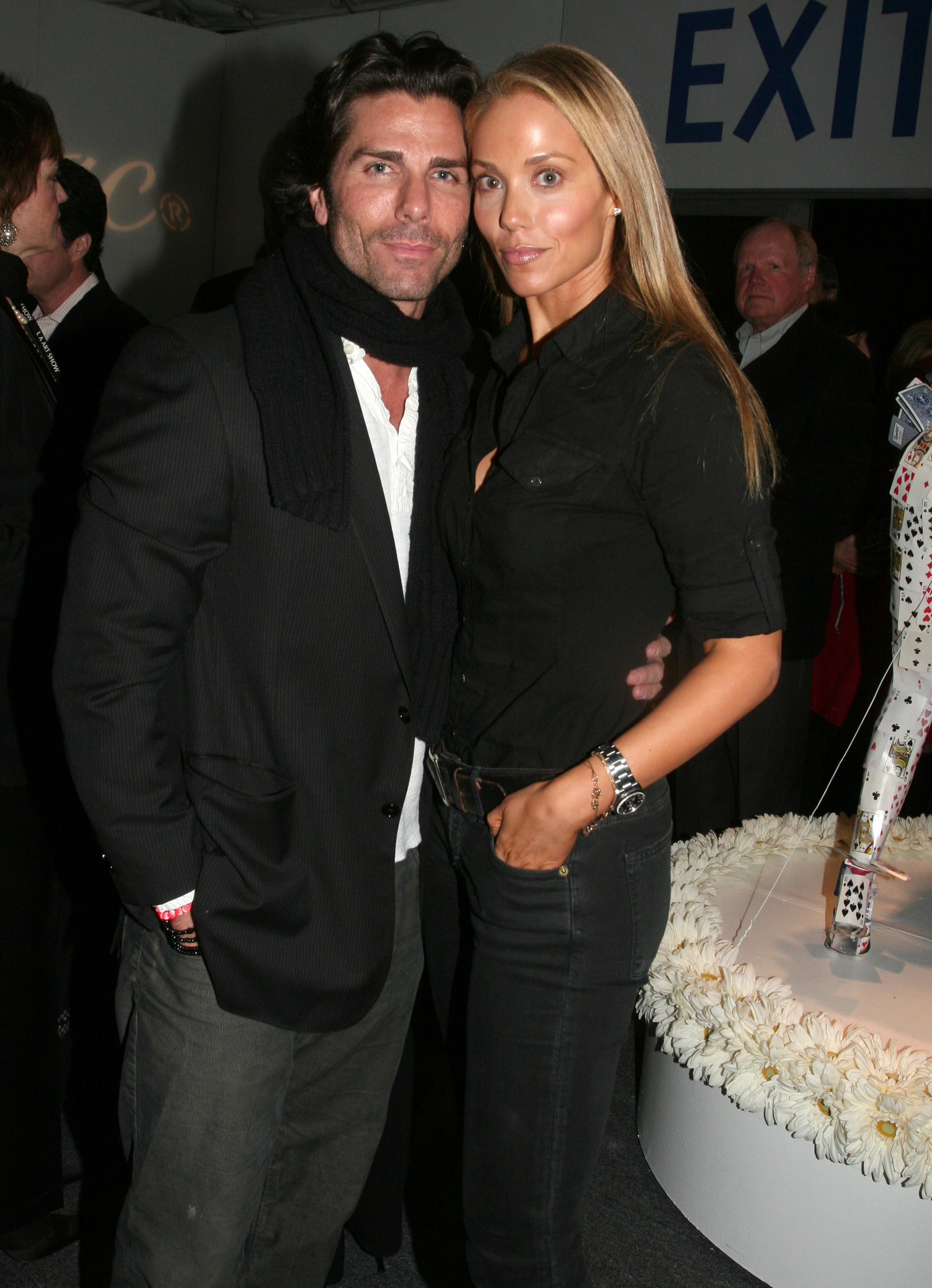
- Lauren and wife Elizabeth Berkley at the Los Angeles Art Show at the Barker Hangar in Santa Monica, California, January 2008
- Born: Greg Lauren Dana Smith; January 6, 1970 (age 56); New York City, U.S.
- Education: Princeton University (BA)
- Occupations: Actor, painter, fashion designer
- Years active: 1994–2010
- Spouse: Elizabeth Berkley (m. 2003)
- Children: 1
- Relatives: Ralph Lauren (uncle); David Lauren (cousin); Dylan Lauren (cousin)

Greg Lauren Dana Smith (born January 6, 1970) is an American actor, painter, and fashion designer. He is the nephew of fashion designer Ralph Lauren.

== Early life ==
Lauren was born in New York City, into a family of Belarusian-Jewish descent, and is the nephew of Ralph Lauren, a renowned fashion designer. Greg Lauren graduated with a bachelor's degree in art history at Princeton University in 1991.

== Career ==
Lauren portrayed Brett Nelson on The Young and the Restless on CBS, and has appeared in films including Friends & Family, The Wedding Planner, and Boogie Nights. A painter, he has painted nudes commanding up to $15,000 which were bought by Renée Zellweger, Demi Moore, Ben Stiller, Cuba Gooding, Jr., and other celebrities.

He has been cover artist for the DC Comics Vertigo title, Hellblazer issues 215-218 were solicited by the publisher. His artwork is sold at Bespoke Collection. In 2011, he launched his fashion brand named after himself with a ready-to-wear collection for men and women.

== Personal life ==
On November 1, 2003, he and Saved by the Bell actress Elizabeth Berkley in Cabo San Lucas, Mexico married in a Jewish ceremony. Their son was born in July 2012.

== Filmography ==
- Melrose Place (1994, TV Series) .... Cute Guy
- A Friend of Dorothy (1994, Short) .... Matt
- Silk Stalkings (1994–1995, TV Series) .... Jeffrey Ventnor / Phil Woodruff
- Indictment: The McMartin Trial (1995, TV Movie) .... Reporter #7
- Batman Forever (1995) .... Aide
- Sawbones (1995, TV Movie) .... Richard Klein
- Loungers (1995) .... Conrad
- Twelve (1996, Short) .... Uncle Mick
- The Little Death .... Neighbor
- A Time to Kill (1996) .... Taylor
- Batman & Robin (1997) .... Motorcycle Gang Member #2
- Boogie Nights (1997) .... Young Stud
- Working (1997, TV Series) .... Greg
- The Practice (1997, TV Series) .... Myra's Husband
- Between Brothers (1997, TV Series) .... Billings
- Diagnosis: Murder (1998, TV Series) .... Freddie
- The Young and the Restless (1998–1999, TV Series) .... Brett Nelson / Brett
- The Learning Curve (1999) .... Todd
- The Disciples (1999, TV Movie) .... Mick Partridge
- What Angels Fear (1999) .... Kevin Bochelli
- The Prophet's Game (2000) .... Detective James
- The Wedding Planner (2001) .... Keith
- The Elevator (2001, TV Movie) .... Charles
- V.I.P. (2001, TV Series) .... Kyle Stamper
- Friends & Family (2001) .... Stephen Torcelli
- Pasadena (2001, TV Series) .... Steve
- Time of Fear (2002) .... Det. Steve Benton
- Hitters (2002)
- Women in Trouble (2009) .... Fireman
