= Friends & Family (film) =

2001 film by Kristen Coury

- Directed by: Kristen Coury
- Written by: Joseph Triebwasser
- Produced by: Kristen Coury; Linda Moran; Joseph Triebwasser
- Starring: Greg Lauren; Christopher Gartin; Tovah Feldshuh
- Cinematography: John Leuba
- Edited by: Tom Swartwout
- Music by: Kurt Hoffman
- Distributed by: Regent Releasing (US) here!films (International)
- Release date: June 8, 2001 (New York Lesbian and Gay Film Festival)
- Running time: 87 minutes
- Country: United States
- Language: English

Friends & Family is a 2001 gay-themed comedy film directed by Kristen Coury and starring Greg Lauren, Christopher Gartin, and Tovah Feldshuh.

== Plot ==
Stephen Torcelli lives with his partner Danny Russo in New York City. When Stephen's parents call to announce a surprise visit for his father's birthday, Stephen and Danny scramble to conceal their double lives. The Torcellis already know that Stephen and Danny are gay; they don't know that they're enforcers for the Patrizzi crime family. Stephen's father is an undercover FBI agent and if he learns of their criminal affiliation he'll be obligated to report them. Stephen and Danny have told them that they run a catering company, even though neither of them can cook.

Meanwhile, Don Patrizzi's daughter Jenny has announced her engagement. Even though her fiancé is not Sicilian, Don Patrizzi decides to throw her a lavish engagement party which gets combined with the birthday party for Mr Torcelli. Mrs Torcelli suggests that the boys cater the party, sending them into a panic. One of Don Patrizzi's sons is an excellent chef - and the other is a master decorator - so the Patrizzi boys take care of the food and the decor. As a special treat for Jenny, Don Patrizzi forcibly "invites" a U.S. Senator under his control to the party.

It is this guest who is of the most interest to the Jenningses, the parents of Jenny's fiancé. They run a militia group which has declared war on the United States government and they want to take the opportunity to hold the Senator, a representative of that government, hostage.

Oblivious to this threat, Don Patrizzi's soldiers have been enlisted to serve as waiters for the party. Reasoning that a catering company owned by a gay couple would have gay employees, they recruit a flamboyant friend of the Danny and Stephen's to give them a crash course on gay (including such vital information as the correct order of Elizabeth Taylor's husbands and the proper use of the expression "puh-lease!").

At the party all is going well until the Jenningses and their militiamen strike. They take the guests hostage and force the Senator to record a message for the media. Stephen and Danny, fearful that the tape will lead to police action and a deadly shootout, neutralize the militia with the help of the newly gay-acting Patrizzi soldiers and some random drag queens that were brought to the party for a vaguely defined purpose. With their cover blown, Stephen and Danny tell Mr Torcelli that they're ready for him to turn them in. However, the birthday he's celebrating is his 60th, meaning that he's been mandatorily retired and is no longer with the FBI. In other happy news for Don Patrizzi, Jenny's fiancé turns out to be adopted and he was actually born Sicilian after all.

== Cast ==
- Greg Lauren as Stephen Torcelli
- Christopher Gartin as Danny Russo
- Rebecca Creskoff as Jenny Patrizzi
- Edward Hibbert as Richard Grayson
- Allison Mackie as Cheryl
- Meshach Taylor as Bruno
- Beth Fowler as Mrs. Torcelli
- Frank Pellegrino as Mr. Torcelli
- Johnny Russo as Max
- Sam Coppola as Carlo Ricci
- Danny Mastrogiorgio as Vito Patrizzi
- Brian Lane Green as Damon Jennings

== Home media ==
Friends & Family was released on Region 1 DVD on October 21, 2003.

== Reception ==
At Metacritic, which assigns a weighted average score, the film has a score of 36 out of 100, indicating "Generally unfavorable" based on 7 reviews. While filmthreat.com found the film "a mild but diverting farce" and that it includes many "Italian-American stereotypes". One sequence in the film "is politically incorrect to the point of subversive hilarity".
