= David Lauren =

American businessman (born 1971)

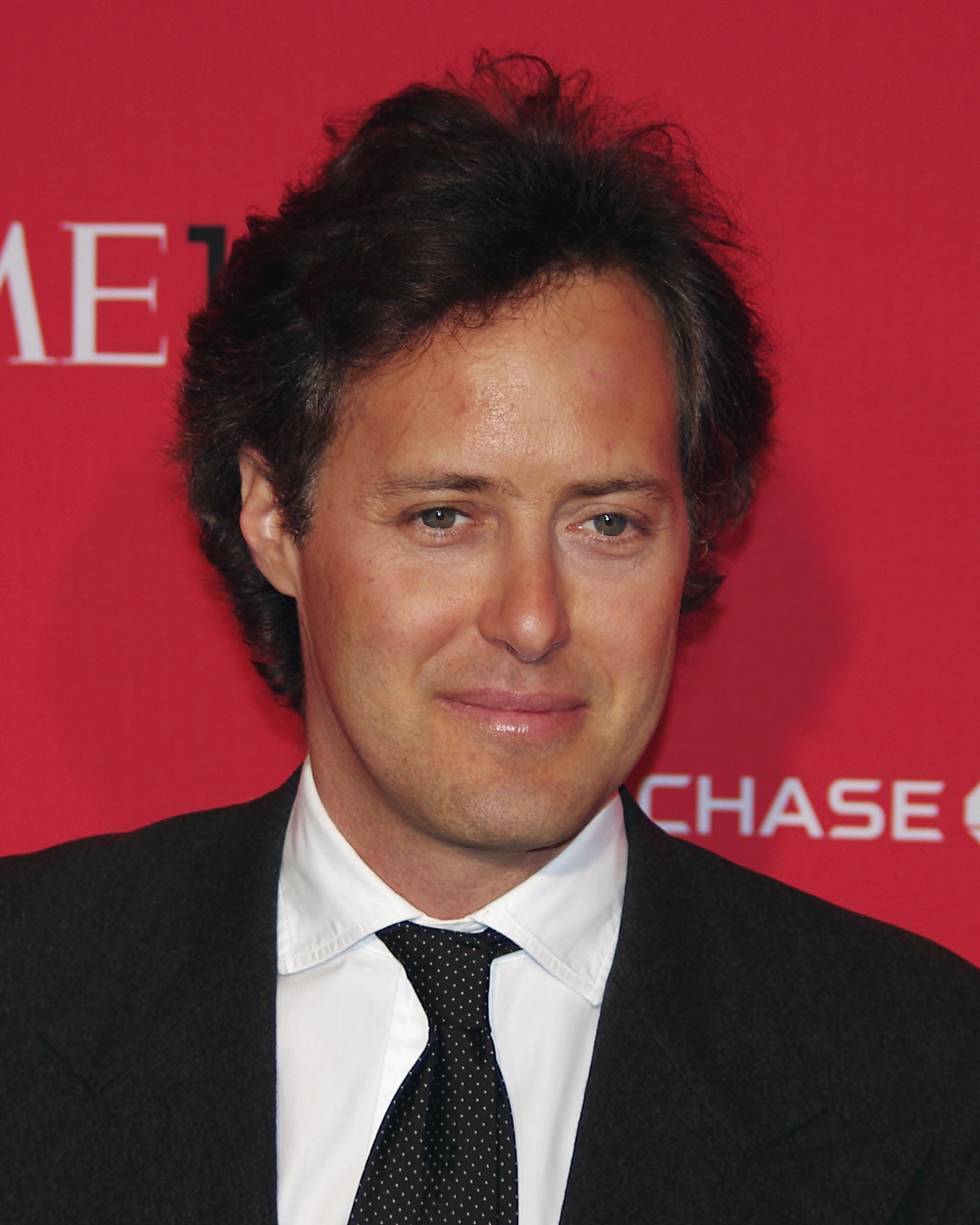
- Lauren in 2012
- Born: 1971 (age 54–55); New York City, U.S.
- Education: Duke University
- Employer: Ralph Lauren Corporation
- Title: Chief Innovation Officer, Strategic Advisor to the CEO, Head of the Ralph Lauren Foundation and Vice Chairman of the Board
- Spouse: Lauren Bush (m. 2011)
- Children: 3
- Parent(s): Ralph Lauren; Ricky Lauren
- Relatives: Dylan Lauren (sister); Greg Lauren (cousin)

David Lauren (born 1971) is an American businessman. He is the middle child and younger son of designer Ralph Lauren, and is married to Lauren Bush.

== Early life ==
Lauren was born in 1971 to Ricky Ann (née Loew-Beer) and designer Ralph Lauren. His maternal heritage includes Jewish and Catholic immigrant roots from Austria. He has an older brother, film producer Andrew Lauren, and a younger sister, Dylan Lauren, founder of Dylan's Candy Bar. Lauren studied political science at Duke University, where he founded Swing, a lifestyle magazine for Generation X that was later published by Hachette Filipacchi Médias.

== Career ==
Lauren is Chief Innovation Officer, Strategic Advisor to the CEO, Head of the Ralph Lauren Foundation, and Vice Chairman of the Board.

He previously was Executive Vice President of Advertising, Marketing and Corporate Communications at Ralph Lauren Corporation, overseeing the company's global marketing campaigns and communications strategy.

In 2000, Lauren led the launch of RalphLauren.com and the Ralph Lauren Media division, coining the concept "merchan‑tainment" – a blend of merchandising and entertainment.

He is credited with leading Ralph Lauren's early mobile applications and digital innovations, the launch of the Rugby Ralph Lauren brand, and partnerships with Olympic teams, including outfitting Team USA at successive Olympic Games.

He was named "Marketer of the Year" by Daily News Record in 2007.

He joined the Ralph Lauren Corporation board of directors in August 2013.

== Philanthropy ==
Lauren is president of the Ralph Lauren Corporate Foundation, where he oversees the company's philanthropic programs, including the Pink Pony Fund supporting cancer care and prevention. Since 2023, he has served on the board of trustees at NewYork–Presbyterian Hospital.

== Personal life ==
On September 4, 2011, Lauren married Lauren Bush, granddaughter of former U.S. President George H. W. Bush. They have three sons: James Richard (b. 2015), Max Walker (b. 2018), and Robert Rocky (b. 2021).
