= Ralph Lauren =

American fashion designer and executive (born 1939)

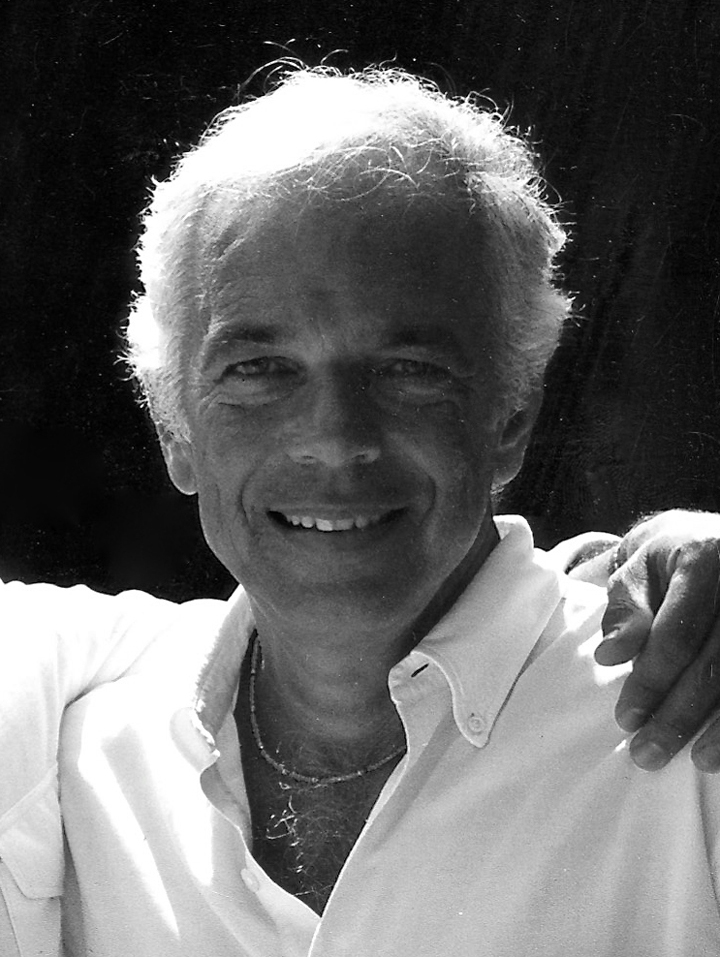
- Lauren in 2013
- Born: Ralph Lifshitz; October 14, 1939 (age 87); New York City, US
- Occupations: Fashion designer; philanthropist; business executive
- Years active: 1967–present
- Board member of: Ralph Lauren Corporation; Club Monaco
- Spouse: Ricky Loew-Beer (m. 1964)
- Children: 3, including Dylan and David
- Relatives: Greg Lauren (nephew); Lauren Bush (daughter-in-law)

Ralph Lauren (/ˈlɔːrən/ LOR-ən; né Lifshitz; born October 14, 1939) is an American fashion designer, philanthropist, and billionaire businessman, best known for founding the brand Ralph Lauren, a global multibillion-dollar enterprise. He stepped down as CEO of the company in September 2015 but remains executive chairman and chief creative officer. As of June 2026, his net worth is estimated at US$15.2 billion.

== Early life ==
Lauren was born on October 14, 1939, in the Bronx, New York City, the son of Ashkenazi Jewish immigrants Frieda Lifshitz (née Cutler) and Frank Lifshitz (né Efraim Lifshitz), an artist and house painter, from Pinsk, Belarus. The youngest of four siblings, he has two brothers and one sister. At the age of 16, he and his brother George Poitras Lauren legally changed their last name from Lifshitz to Lauren, due to bullying at school. His choice of the name followed his older brother Jerry Lauren, who had first done so after experiencing 'humorous mispronunciations at roll call.'

Lauren attended day school followed by the Manhattan Talmudical Academy, before eventually graduating from DeWitt Clinton High School in 1957. He attended Baruch College of the City University of New York (CUNY), where he studied business, although he dropped out after two years.

Lauren was one of several design leaders raised in the Jewish community in the Bronx, along with Calvin Klein and Robert Denning.

== Career ==
=== Early career ===
From 1962 to 1964, Lauren served in the United States Army. After his discharge, he worked briefly for Brooks Brothers as a sales assistant before becoming a salesman for Rivetz, a necktie company. At age 28, working for tie manufacturer Beau Brummell, Lauren convinced the company president to let him start his own line. He launched The Ralph Lauren Corporation in 1967 with men's ties.

=== Polo ===
Lauren named his first full line of menswear Polo in 1968. He worked out of a single "drawer" from a showroom in the Empire State Building and made deliveries to stores himself. By 1969, the Manhattan department store Bloomingdale's had built a Polo shop-in-shop boutique.

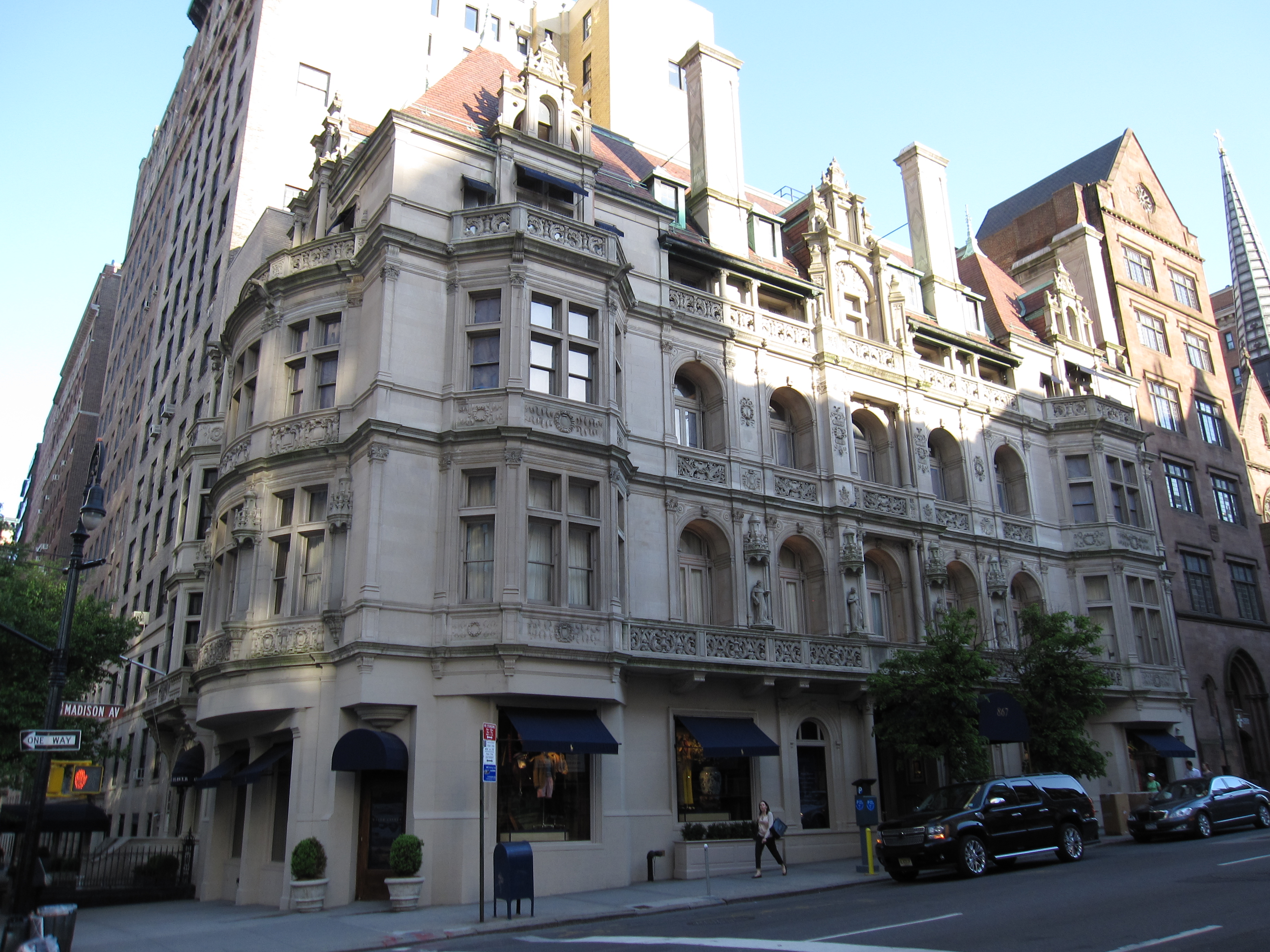
The Polo Ralph Lauren flagship store occupying the Gertrude Rhinelander Waldo House on Madison Avenue in New York City

In 1971, Ralph Lauren Corporation launched a line of tailored shirts for women, which introduced the Polo player emblem to the world for the first time, appearing on the shirt's cuff. The first full women's collection was launched the following year. In 1971 Lauren also opened a store on Rodeo Drive in Beverly Hills, California; this was the first freestanding store for an American designer.

In 1972, the Ralph Lauren Corporation introduced a signature cotton mesh Polo shirt in various colors. Featuring the polo player logo at the chest, based on an image of Bennie Gutierrez, the shirt became emblematic of the preppy look which was one of Ralph Lauren's signature styles. The tagline for the ad campaign was: "Every team has its color—Polo has seventeen."

In 1974, Lauren outfitted the male cast of the film The Great Gatsby in costumes from his Polo line: a 1920s-style series of men's suits and sweaters; and a pink suit that was designed by Lauren especially for Robert Redford's Jay Gatsby. In 1977, Diane Keaton and Woody Allen wore Lauren's clothes throughout Allen's film Annie Hall.

Demonstrated by Lauren's preppy brand style, Lauren's work is heavily influenced by the aesthetics of the British aristocracy, country life and traditional craftsmanship; the brand consistently incorporates English country style, including cricket sweaters, equestrian themes and collaborations with traditional British mills. Lauren has stated that while American fashion often focuses on the new, his work aims to emulate the British appreciation for heritage, where items are cherished and passed down. Lauren, an Anglophile, has said, "I’ve always loved England because it was non-fashion.... It was timeless. It was not about what was the latest new sleekness. It was about weathering and those things that get better with age."

=== Fragrance ===
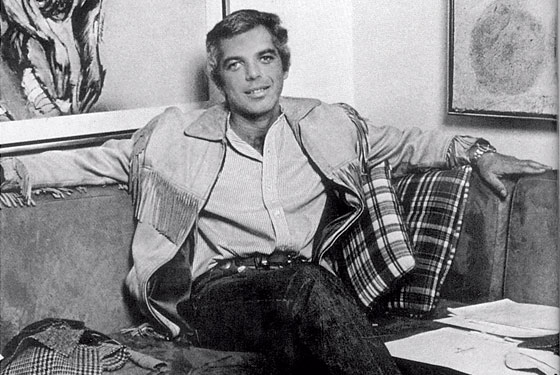
Lauren in his office in 1978

The first Ralph Lauren fragrances, produced by Warner-Lauren, Ltd. were launched at Bloomingdale's in March 1978. Lauren, a fragrance for women, on March 12 and Polo, cologne for men, on March 26. This was the first time that a designer had introduced two fragrances—one for men and one for women—simultaneously.

=== Later 20th century ===
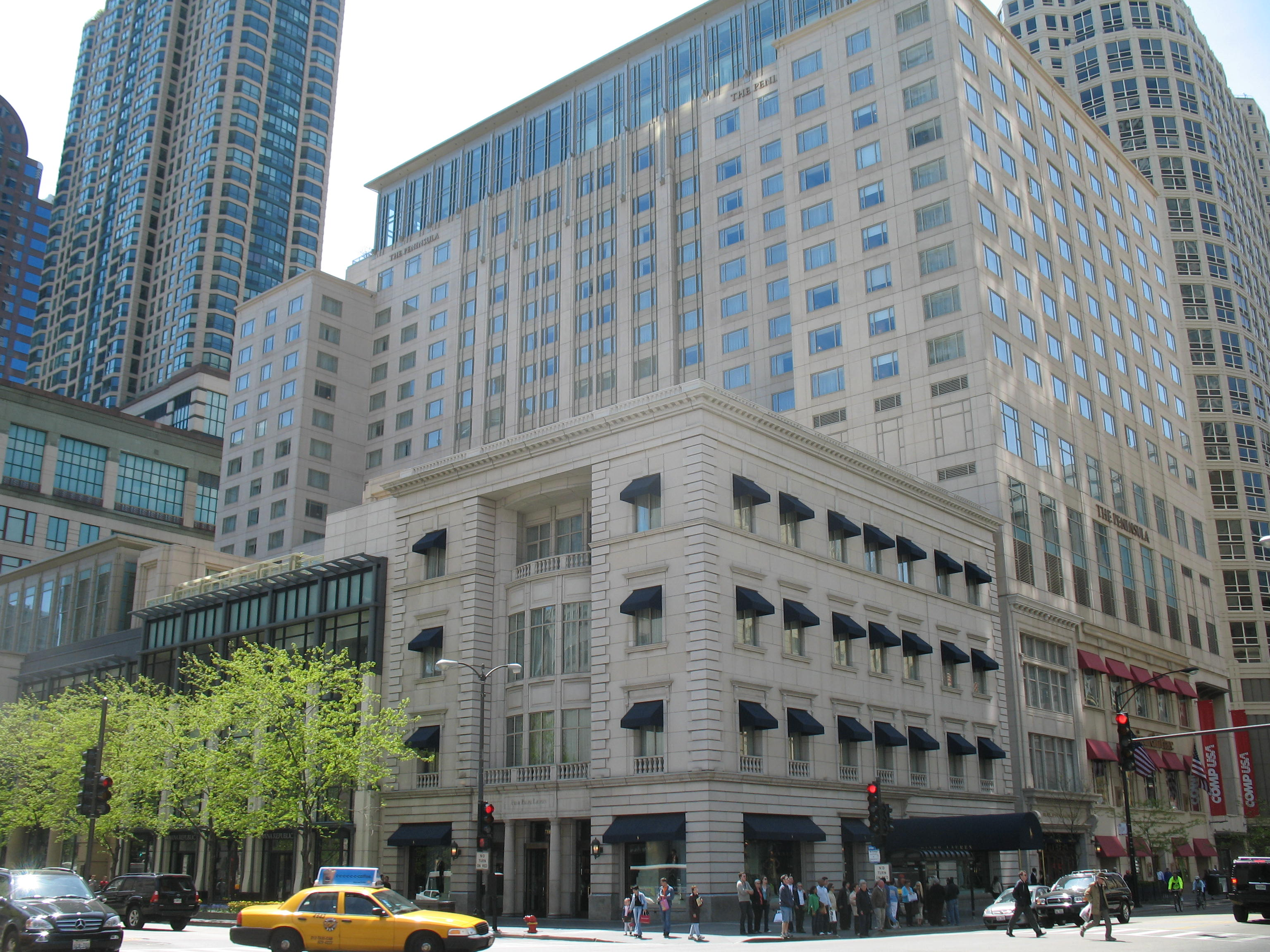
A Polo Ralph Lauren store on the Magnificent Mile in Chicago

The company entered the European market, and went international in 1981 with the opening of the first freestanding store for an American designer on New Bond Street in the West End of London, England.

In 1986, Lauren opened his first flagship in the Rhinelander mansion on Madison Avenue and 72nd Street in New York City. Lauren re-created the building's original opulence with a young design consultant named Naomi Leff, with whom he had previously worked on Ralph Lauren Home. The Polo Sport line was introduced in 1992 followed by over ten additional lines and acquired brands, including Ralph Lauren Purple Label in 1995 and Lauren Ralph Lauren in 1996.

On June 12, 1997, the company became a publicly traded company on the New York Stock Exchange.

The 98-seat restaurant "RL" opened in March 1999 in Chicago. The restaurant occupies in a newly constructed building adjacent to the largest Ralph Lauren flagship store in the world, on the corner of Chicago Avenue and Michigan Avenue. It was followed by the opening of two additional restaurants: "Ralph's" at 173 Boulevard Saint-Germain, Paris flagship store in 2010 and "The Polo Bar" at Polo's flagship in New York in 2015.

=== Later years ===
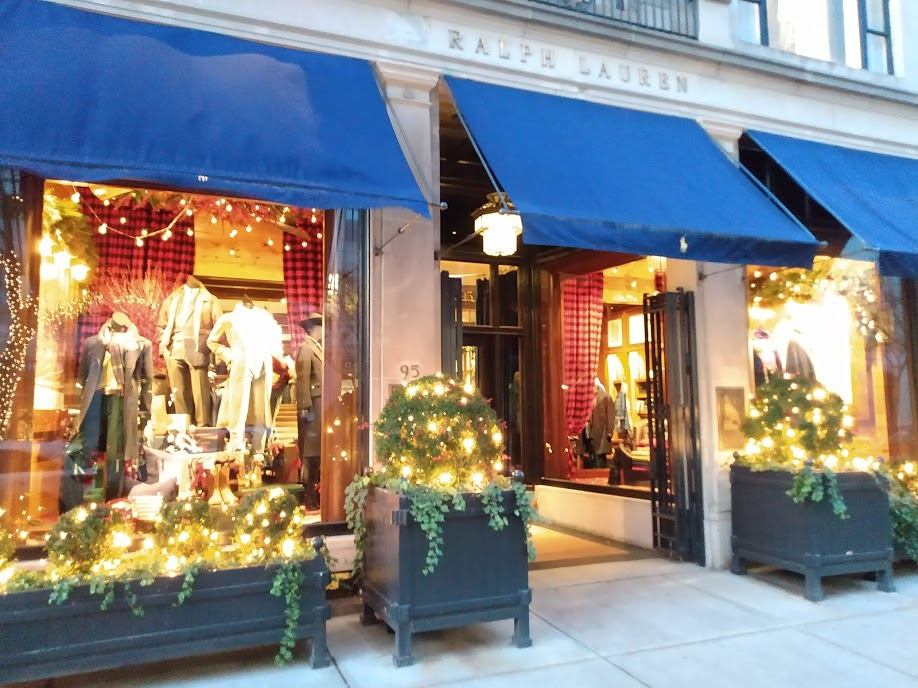
Newbury Street Boston Ralph Lauren Store located at 93-95 Newbury Street, Back Bay Boston

In 2000, the company launched polo.com as its website and online shop, through RL Media (a cooperation between Ralph Lauren and NBC). In 2007, Ralph Lauren Corporation acquired the NBC share of RL Media and the web site was relaunched as ralphlauren.com. In 2008, Ralph Lauren Corporation launched a brand called American Living, exclusively for JCPenney. It was the largest cross-category brand launch in the history of Ralph Lauren and JCPenney. On September 29, 2015, it was announced that Stefan Larsson would replace the company's founder, Ralph Lauren, as CEO in November. Lauren will stay on as executive chairman and chief creative officer.

Lauren has appeared on over 100 magazine covers including Architectural Digest, GQ, Forbes, Town & Country, TIME and Vogue.

Lauren celebrated the 50th anniversary of his brand in a fashion show at Bethesda Terrace in Central Park on September 8, 2018. Attendees included Oprah Winfrey, Hillary Clinton, Kanye West, Robert De Niro, and Jessica Chastain.

== Personal life ==
=== Family ===
On December 20, 1964, Lauren married Ricky Ann Loew-Beer in New York City. The two had met six months earlier, in a doctor's office where she was working as a receptionist; on alternate days, she was teaching dance. She is the author of The Hamptons: Food, Family and History. The Laurens are members of the Park Avenue Synagogue in Manhattan, leading the synagogue's capital campaign that ended in 2019.

They have three children, including David and Dylan. In September 2011, David married Lauren Bush, the niece of former U.S. President George W. Bush.

In April 1987, Lauren underwent surgery to remove a benign brain tumor and made a full recovery.

Lauren owns a 17,000-acre cattle ranch in Ridgway, Colorado, and a 17,000 sq foot manor built in 1919 in Bedford, New York.

=== Personal controversies ===
During the early 1990s, Lauren reportedly had a prolonged extramarital affair with model Kim Nye, who was featured in his Safari fragrance campaign. According to journalist Michael Gross, Lauren sought to have details of the relationship removed from authorized biographies. The alleged affair was mentioned in multiple media outlets and documented in Gross’s 2003 unauthorized biography, Genuine Authentic: The Real Life of Ralph Lauren.

=== Automobile collection ===
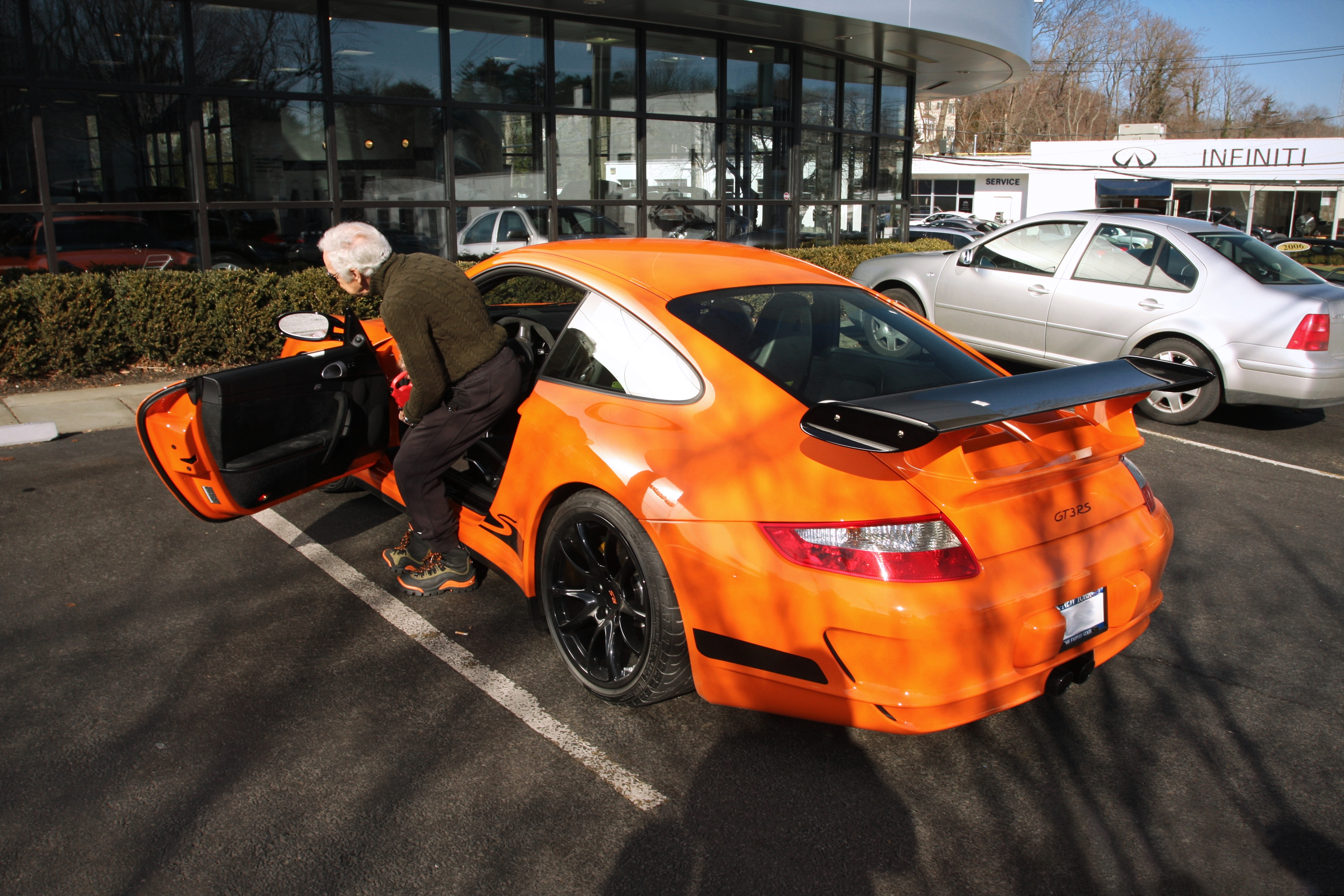
Ralph Lauren with his Porsche GT3 RS (2010)

Lauren is well known as a collector of automobiles, with about 100 automobiles, some being extremely rare. He owns a 1962 Ferrari 250 GTO, two Ferrari TRs, three 1996 McLaren F1s (one of them an ultra-rare McLaren F1 LM), a Mercedes-Benz 300 SL Gullwing, a 1929 Bentley 4½ Litre ("Blower Bentley"), one Bugatti Type 57SC Atlantic, a 1937 Bugatti Type 57SC Gangloff, a Porsche 911 GT3 RS, a Bugatti Veyron, a 1930 Mercedes-Benz SSK "Count Trossi" (aka "The Black Prince"), a 1938 Alfa Romeo 8C 2900B Mille Miglia. and a rare Lamborghini Reventón Roadster.

Lauren's cars have won "Best of Show" at the Pebble Beach Concours d'Elegance twice: His 1938 Bugatti Type 57SC Atlantic won in 1990 and his 1930 Mercedes-Benz SSK "Count Trossi" roadster won in 1993. In 2005 his collection was displayed at Boston's Museum of Fine Arts. Seventeen cars from his collection were exhibited at the Musée des Arts Décoratifs, Paris, in 2011. In 2017, Lauren's now $600 million car collection took center stage during New York Fashion Week.

=== Philanthropy ===
Lauren has focused a substantial amount of his philanthropy to address cancer. In 1989, he co-founded the Nina Hyde Center for Breast Cancer Research at Georgetown University Hospital in Washington D.C. in memory of the late Post fashion correspondent, Nina Hyde. He served as chairman and created the name and symbol for Fashion Targets Breast Cancer, a charitable initiative of the CFDA that founded in 1994 that marshals the goodwill and services of the fashion industry to raise public awareness and funds for breast cancer internationally. In 2003, Lauren supported the establishment the Ralph Lauren Center for Cancer Care and Prevention in Harlem, Manhattan, New York City. The center is a collaboration between Ralph Lauren, Memorial Sloan-Kettering, and North General Hospital in Harlem. In 2014, the Ralph Lauren Corporation partnered with the Royal Marsden, the largest and most comprehensive cancer center in Europe, to develop a world-class breast cancer research facility. They opened the Royal Marsden Ralph Lauren Center for Breast Cancer Research in 2016. In 2023, the Ralph Lauren Center for Cancer Prevention was opened at the Lombardi Comprehensive Cancer Center of Georgetown University.

In 2000, the Ralph Lauren Corporation launched its Volunteer Program, which energizes employees and creates meaningful connections with the communities in which they work. On Friday, September 15, Ralph Lauren Corporation launched the Pink Pony Campaign, a national initiative to reduce disparities in cancer care by raising awareness as well as enhancing prevention, screening, and treatment in poor and underserved communities. Similarly, in 2006, the Polo Jeans G.I.V.E. (Get Involved, Volunteer, Exceed) campaign was created to inspire and encourage community service through volunteerism by supporting the efforts of dedicated volunteers and their causes, including Habitat for Humanity.

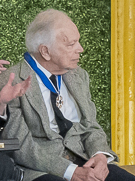
Lauren receiving the Presidential Medal of Freedom at the White House, January 2025

The Polo Ralph Lauren Foundation established the American Heroes Fund following the September 11th attacks to allow Polo's 10,000 employees worldwide, as well as their customers, the opportunity to participate in the relief effort.

The Polo Fashion School was established in 2004, in which company executives work with inner-city youth to offer insights into the fashion business.

The Star-Spangled Banner, the original 1813 flag that inspired Francis Scott Key to write the United States National Anthem, was preserved by a $10 million contribution to Save America's Treasures from Polo Ralph Lauren in 1998. The flag was then unveiled on Wednesday, November 19, 2008, in a new gallery at the Smithsonian National Museum of American History, in Washington, D.C. Ralph Lauren Corporation announced in July 2013 its commitment to restore the elite École des Beaux-Arts in Paris, one of the most influential art schools in France.

=== Politics ===
As recently as 2012, with a $35,800 donation to the Obama Victory Fund, Lauren made regular small donations to U.S. Democratic candidates. In 2022, the Ralph Lauren Corp, through individuals, donated $63,000 to Democratic organizations and individuals.

== Awards and honors ==
Year	Awards & Honors
1970	A jury of men's fashion editors select Lauren to receive the Coty Award for the highest creativity of the year in men's fashion design.
1973	Ralph Lauren wins his second Coty Award for menswear. It is the first time a menswear designer has been a two-time Coty winner.
1974	Ralph Lauren wins his first Coty "Winnie" Award for womenswear.
1975	Ralph Lauren wins the American Fashion Award from the Council of Fashion Designers of America.
1976	Ralph Lauren enters the Coty Hall of Fame for Menswear, and also wins his second Coty Award for Womenswear, the first time a designer has won awards for both menswear and womenswear in the same year.
1977	Ralph Lauren receives the Coty Hall of Fame award for womenswear.
1979	Ralph Lauren receives a special citation for his direct influence in establishing American fashion on a worldwide basis.
1981	At the first Council of Fashion Designers of America award ceremony, Ralph Lauren wins his first CFDA Fashion Award.
1985	Ralph Lauren receives the Menswear Association of America's Designer Achievement Award.
1986	The Council of Fashion Designers of America (CFDA) award Ralph Lauren the honor of "Retailer of the Year".
1988	Pratt Institute awards Ralph Lauren with an honorary Doctorate of Fine Arts.
1992	Ralph Lauren receives the first-ever CFDA Lifetime Achievement award—an honor created specifically for him and presented with heartfelt recognition by Audrey Hepburn.
1995	Ralph Lauren receives the CFDA Award for Womenswear Designer of the Year.
1996	Ralph Lauren is honored with the Nina Hyde Center for Breast Cancer Research's first Humanitarian Award, which is presented to Lauren by Princess Diana.
1996	Receives an Honorary Doctorate of Humane Letters from Brandeis University for his commitment to arts and education, and for his prominent role in the fight against breast cancer.
1996	Ralph Lauren receives the CFDA Award for Menswear Designer of the Year.
1997	Ralph Lauren wins CFDA's Award for Humanitarian Leadership in recognition of his commitment to fighting breast cancer.
2000	In celebration of his contribution to American style, Ralph Lauren is among the first designers inducted into the Fashion Walk of Fame in the center of New York City's Fashion District.(Garment District, Manhattan)
2003	Ralph Lauren Corporation receives a Restore America Heroes award from The National Trust for Historic Preservation.
2007	Ralph Lauren wins the American Fashion Legend Award, presented by Oprah Winfrey on June 4 at the CFDA Awards, held at the New York Public Library.
2009	Ralph Lauren wins the CFDA's newly created Popular Vote Award, given to the designer who receives the most votes cast online by the public.
2010	New York City Mayor Michael Bloomberg presents Ralph Lauren with a key to the city.
2010	In a private ceremony at the Élysée Palace, Ralph Lauren receives the Chevalier de la Légion d'honneur from Nicolas Sarkozy, President of the Republic of France, in recognition of his contributions as a designer, business leader, and philanthropist.
2012	Ralph Lauren tops the list for the global apparel industry category for the first time in Fortune's "World's Most Admired Companies" 2012."
2014	The Company's "The Dog Walk Campaign" wins the Clio Image Award in the category for Partnerships and Sponsorships, while the Omotesando RRL Store in Tokyo, Japan, wins for the category of Architectural Design.
2014	The Smithsonian presents Ralph Lauren with the James Smithson Bicentennial Medal. The medal recognizes Lauren's lifetime contributions to American entrepreneurship, artistry, and creativity as well as acknowledging the critical leadership role Lauren played in helping preserve the Star-Spangled Banner as part of "Save America's Treasures" initiative established by Hillary Clinton when she served as First Lady.
2016	Ralph Lauren and Leonardo DiCaprio are honored at the 50th Anniversary Riverkeeper Fishermen's Ball at Chelsea Piers in New York City.
2016	Ralph Lauren receives Women's Wear Daily's inaugural John B. Fairchild Honor.
2017	Lauren is appointed an Honorary Knight Commander of the Order of the British Empire (KBE). On June 20, 2019, in a private ceremony at Buckingham Palace, he received the award from Prince Charles.
2025	January 4, 2025, he received the Presidential Medal of Freedom for his achievements in fashion and philanthropy from President Joe Biden. He became the first fashion designer to receive this award.
2025	In November 2025, Lauren was awarded the American Womenswear Designer of the Year award at the annual CFDA Fashion Awards in New York City.

== See also ==
- List of fashion designers
- List of swimwear brands
