= Steve Gordon (director) =

American film director (1938–1982)

- Born: October 10, 1938; Chester, Pennsylvania, U.S.
- Died: November 27, 1982 (aged 44); New York City, U.S.
- Education: Ohio State University
- Occupations: Screenwriter, film director
- Notable work: Arthur (1981)
- Awards: Nominated—Academy Award for Best Original Screenplay (1981)

Steve Gordon (October 10, 1938 – November 27, 1982) was an American screenwriter and film director. He wrote and directed the 1981 romantic comedy Arthur, starring Dudley Moore.

Gordon was born in Pennsylvania and grew up in Ohio. He died in New York City on November 27, 1982, from a heart attack at the age of 44.

== Arthur ==
Gordon was nominated for the Academy Award for Best Original Screenplay for Arthur. He wrote the screenplay while sitting at his regular table at the Upper East Side restaurant J.G. Melon in New York City. It marked his only work as a film director.

He had written only one previous feature film. It was The One and Only (1978), starring Henry Winkler. He had spent several years writing for television.

== Early and personal life ==
Gordon was born in Chester, Pennsylvania, but was raised by his aunt and uncle in Ottawa Hills, Ohio, after his parents died. Gordon was Jewish, grew up in the Toledo suburb of Ottawa Hills, Ohio, and graduated from Ottawa Hills High School in 1957.

Gordon then attended Ohio State University, where he majored in political science and history. He graduated in 1961.

Gordon had resided in New York City since his graduation from Ohio State. He never married.

== Death and legacy ==
According to Gordon's brother Dr. Michael Gordon, Gordon had been suffering from chest pains and had seen a doctor five days before his death. Gordon's niece was with him at his New York City apartment when he suffered a fatal heart attack while eating lunch on November 27, 1982. Steve Gordon was interred at Woodlawn Cemetery in Toledo, Ohio.

In 1982, his brother, Dr. Michael Gordon, created an annual scholarship for Ottawa Hills High School students in Gordon's name. In 2010, Gordon was inducted into the Ottawa Hills Foundation's Community Hall of Fame.

== TV and film ==
- Lotsa Luck (1974) (TV)
- The New Dick Van Dyke Show (1974) (TV)
- Paul Sand in Friends and Lovers (1974) (TV)
- Chico and the Man (1974) (TV)
- Barney Miller (1975) (TV)
- The Practice (1976) (TV) (Creator)
- The One and Only (1978)
- Good Time Harry (1980) (TV)
- Arthur (1981) (Director/writer)
