= P. J. Clarke's =

Restaurant in Manhattan, New York, U.S.

Coordinates: 40°45′32.45″N 73°58′5.14″W

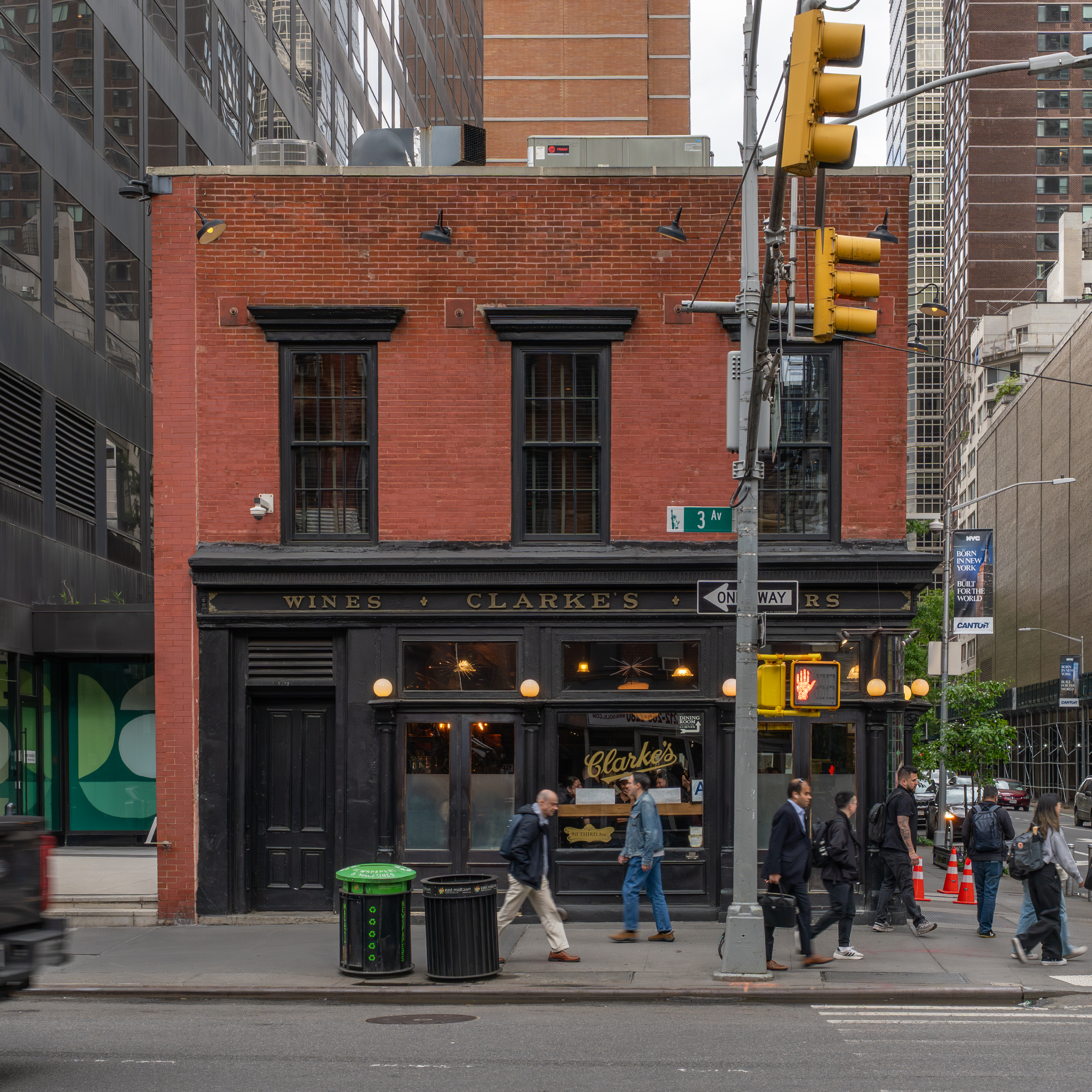
- Interactive map of P. J. Clarke's

Restaurant information
- Established: 1884; 142 years ago
- Food type: Hamburgers, Pub Food
- Location: 915 Third Avenue (NE corner of East 55th Street), New York, New York, 10022, United States
- Other locations: 44 West 63rd Street, 250 Vesey St.
- Website: www.pjclarkes.com

P. J. Clarke's is a saloon and gastropub, established in 1884 and is one of the oldest continuously operating restaurants in New York City. It occupies a building located at 915 Third Avenue on the northeast corner of East 55th Street in Manhattan.

The restaurant is primarily known for its hamburgers such as the Cadillac.

== History ==
The bar was once owned by a Patrick J. Clarke, an Irish immigrant who was hired in the early 1900s by a Mr. Duneen who ran the saloon. After about ten years working for him Clarke bought the bar and changed the name. In 1965, its maître d' Joe Allen left and opened the Manhattan restaurant named Joe Allen.

The building is a holdout and is surrounded by 919 Third Avenue, a 47-story skyscraper. Clarke's former owners, the Lavezzo brothers, signed a deal in which the building housing the saloon was sold for $1.5 million and a 99-year lease was signed with Tishman Realty and Construction. Due to financial reverses the Lavezzos were forced to sell their interest to a consortium, which included George Steinbrenner, Timothy Hutton, and others. Prior to his arrest in 2008, Ponzi schemer Bernard Madoff, whose offices were located near to the bar, was also an investor.

The building was originally a four-story structure. It lost the top two floors when the skyscraper went up in the late 1960s. On the second floor there is now a separate upstairs bar/restaurant called Sidecar, which offers a more formal dining experience.

=== Other locations ===
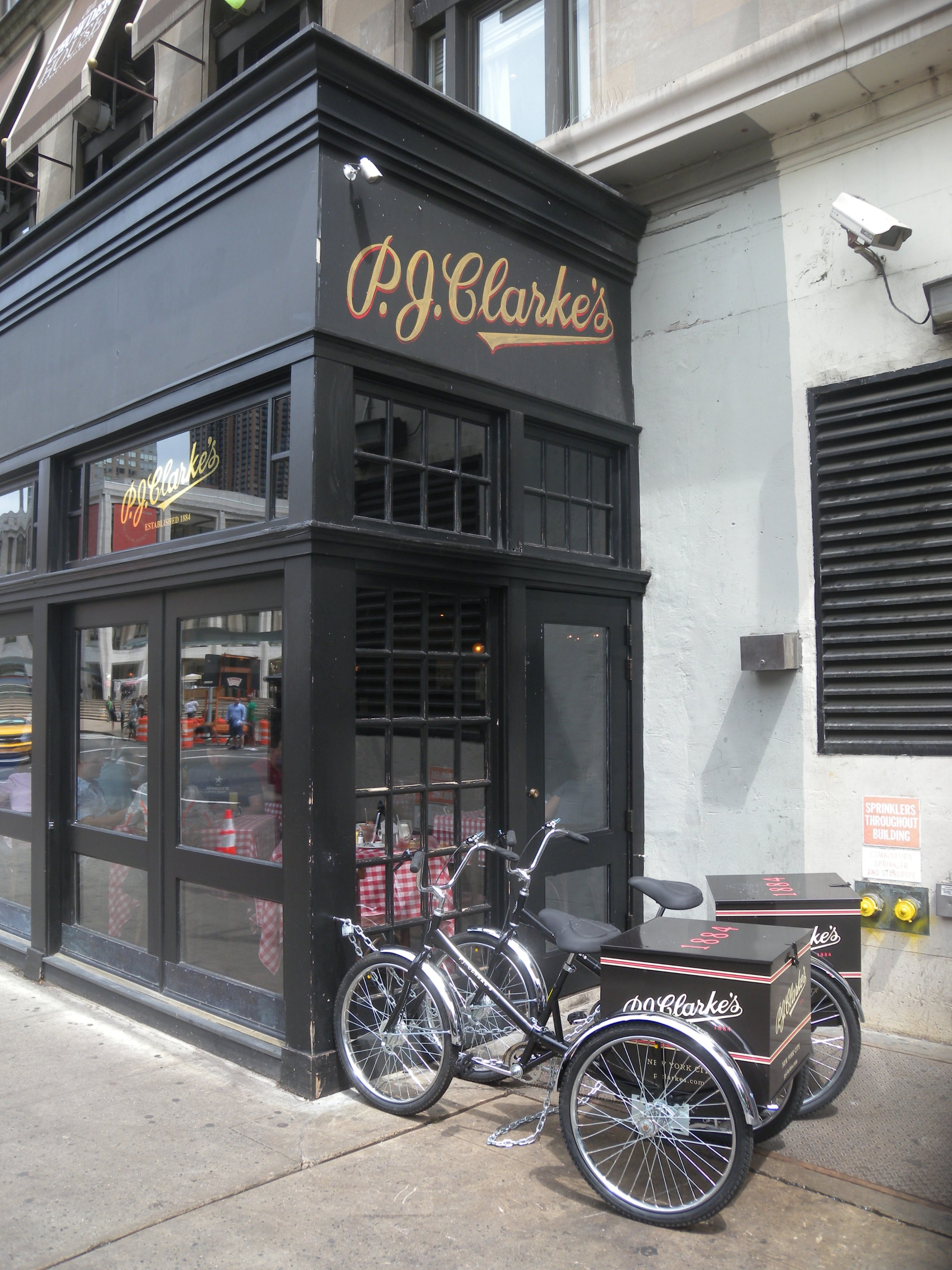
Columbus Square

It has a second location at 44 West 63rd Street on the southeast corner of Columbus Avenue, as well as a location at 250 Vesey Street in Battery Park. Outside of New York City, there are locations in Philadelphia and Washington, DC.

There are two locations in Brazil. Its first location outside the U.S. opened on November 7, 2008, in São Paulo, Brazil, as a partnership with local entrepreneur Maria Rita Pikielny Marracini.

== Notable visitors ==
The bar has catered to a number of notables over the years:

- Nat King Cole proclaimed in the late 1950s that his P. J. Clarke's bacon cheeseburger was "the Cadillac of burgers!"
- Buddy Holly proposed to his fiancée, Maria Elena Santiago, at P. J. Clarke's on June 20, 1958. It was their first date. In honor of that, on April 29, 2011, Maria Elena Holly unveiled the never before seen "True Love Ways" photo of their wedding kiss, now displayed at P. J. Clarke's above Table 53.
- Wes Joice was a bartender at P. J. Clarke's before opening the literary hangout The Lion's Head.
- Elaine Stritch claimed she earned her spot on the short-lived CBS legal series The Trials of O'Brien by bargaining with series star Peter Falk at the actor's regular table, and in commentary for the D. A. Pennebaker film documenting her struggles recording the Original Cast Album for Company, said she spent the evening drinking at P. J. Clarke's after an unsuccessful studio session.
- Johnny Mercer was said to have penned "One for My Baby (and One More for the Road)"—one of the great torch laments of all times—on a napkin while sitting at the bar at P. J. Clarke's when Tommy Joyce was the bartender. The next day Mercer called Joyce to apologize for the line "So, set 'em up, Joe," explaining "I couldn't get your name to rhyme."

== Reviews ==
In 2013, Zagat gave it a food rating of 18.

Was given an 84 by New York Magazine.

== In popular culture ==
=== In literature ===
- P. J. Clarke's appears in Truman Capote's short story "A Beautiful Child" about an afternoon he spent with Marilyn Monroe in 1955. Monroe had refused to enter the bar because she disliked the clientele.
- Guy Bruno tells a detective that he went to "Clarke's on Third Avenue" in Patricia Highsmith's Strangers on a Train.
- In the bestseller “Al Sur de Cartago“ (1985) by the Spanish writer Fernando Schwartz, winner of the prestigious "Planeta" literary award, this pub is the favorite of the protagonist, Chris Rodríguez.

=== In film ===
- Nat's Bar in the Billy Wilder movie The Lost Weekend (1945), was based on P. J. Clarke's. Charles R. Jackson, author of the novel on which that movie was based, was a regular at P. J. Clarke's.
- Side Street (1950). Interior and exterior scenes shown.
- Popeye Doyle, played by Gene Hackman in the movie French Connection II (1975), asks the French police to get him a "nice, juicy P. J. Clarke's hamburger" while he is going through heroin withdrawal.

=== In television ===
- In the AMC Television series Mad Men, the employees of the Sterling Cooper advertising agency frequent P. J. Clarke's.

== See also ==
- List of hamburger restaurants
