= Youth Defense League =

American punk rock music group

Youth Defense League was an American Oi!/New York hardcore (NYHC) band formed in 1986.

== History ==
The band was featured in the Revelation Records compilation album New York City Hardcore, which featured several NYHC bands, including Sick of It All and Gorilla Biscuits.

The band's usage of nationalistic slogans and struggle for the downtrodden working-class man has garnered much support from fascist groups worldwide despite the band denying such claims, arguing that they merely promoted an inclusive positive attitude towards the US and not fascism. The band's lyrics leaned right-wing, patriotic, though not xenophobic. However, seven years after YDL’s last release, the lead singer was photographed in 2012 with the bassist of Skrewdriver,

A new line up of Youth Defense League played a show in Spain on Saturday 30th May 2026.

== Discography ==
=== Albums ===
- Skins for Skins demo (demo tape, 1986)
- Skinheads 88 demo (demo tape, 1988)
- Youth Defense League (New Glory Records – CD, 1999) (bootleg; contains Skin for Skin and Skinhead 88 demos, both singles, plus unreleased)
- American History (live at CBGB's 1987–1988 – Vulture Rock – CD/LP, 1999)
- Voice of Brooklyn (Vulture Rock – LP w/7", 2005) (complete studio recordings, remixed)

=== Singles & Eps ===
- "American Pride" (Oi Core – single, 1988)
- "Skinhead 88"/"The Boys" (Vulture Rock – promo single 7", 1999) (tracks from American History LP/CD)
- "Old Glory" (Vulture Rock – 12", 2000) (remix of unreleased single)
- "American Pride" (Vulture Rock – 12", 2000) (remixed reissue)

=== Compilations ===
- Oi! Glorious Oi! (Step 1 UK – CD/LP, 1987) (song: Turncoat [from Skinhead 88 demo])
- Spirit of Oi!: American Style Part 1 (Oi Core – CD, 1989) (song: Skinhead 88 [from Skinhead 88 demo])
- US of Oi! Volume 1 (Step 1 UK – CD/LP, 1988) (songs: Skinhead 88, Youth of America, Turncoat [all from Skinhead 88 demo])
- New York City Hardcore: The Way It Is (Revelation Records – CD/LP, 1988) (song: Blue Pride [from Skinhead 88 demo])
- Still Out of Fucking Order (Step 1 UK – CD/LP) (song: Skinhead 88 [from Skinhead 88 demo])
