= Dylan Lauren =

American entrepreneur (born 1974)

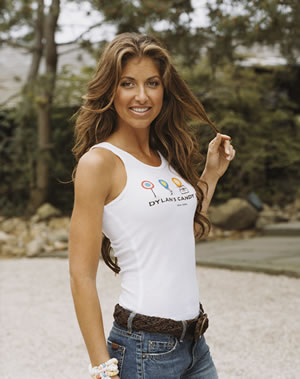
- Lauren in 2011
- Born: May 9, 1974 (age 52); New York City, U.S.
- Education: Duke University (BA)
- Title: Owner and president of Dylan's Candy Bar
- Spouse: Paul Arrouet (m. 2011)
- Children: 2
- Parent(s): Ralph Lauren; Ricky Lauren
- Relatives: David Lauren (brother); Greg Lauren (cousin)

Dylan Lauren (born May 9, 1974) is an American businesswoman. She is the daughter of American fashion designer Ralph Lauren, and the owner of New York City's Dylan's Candy Bar, which claims to be the "largest candy store in the world".

== Early life and education ==
Dylan was born in New York City, the daughter of Ricky Ann Loew-Beer and Ralph Lauren. Her father was the son of Belarusian-Jewish immigrants; her mother was the daughter of a Jewish father and a Catholic mother, both immigrants from Austria. Dylan is the youngest of three children, she has two older brothers, including David Lauren.

She attended the Dalton School in New York City and graduated from Duke University, where she studied art history. She was a member of Kappa Alpha Theta at Duke.

== Career ==
Dylan founded Dylan's Candy Bar in 2001. She was inspired after seeing Willy Wonka & the Chocolate Factory on her sixth birthday. She was named one of the Top 25 Most Stylish New Yorkers by US Weekly in 2007. Her favorite designers include Ralph Lauren, Alice and Olivia, and 7 For All Mankind.

In 2010 Lauren released a book, “Dylan’s Candy Bar: Unwrap Your Sweet Life.” In December 2015, Dylan launched Dylan's Candy BarN, a granting foundation dedicated to supporting animal welfare organizations.

In 2017, Dylan began starring as a judge on the ABC reality series The Toy Box.

=== Controversies ===
==== Labor issues at Dylan’s Candy Bar ====
In 2013, employees at the flagship Dylan’s Candy Bar in Manhattan raised concerns over low wages (some as low as US $8.50 per hour), unpredictable schedules, and lack of formal performance reviews. The staff circulated a petition urging management to address these concerns. However, rather than meet with the group collectively, management reportedly invited employees to speak individually, prompting criticism from labor rights advocates.

==== Use of unpaid internships ====
Also in 2013, Dylan’s Candy Bar faced criticism for advertising unpaid internship roles, including in its Human Resources department. Critics pointed out that such positions, requiring significant responsibilities, might breach U.S. labor law regarding unpaid internships.

== Personal life ==
Lauren and hedge fund manager Paul Arrouet married in June 2011. The ceremony was held in Bedford, New York, at the Lauren family estate, and she wore a bridal gown of her father's design. On April 13, 2015, Dylan's surrogate gave birth to fraternal twins.
