= Dylan's Candy Bar =

Confectionery based in New York City

Coordinates: 40.762168°N 73.965831°W

- Type: Private
- Industry: Confectionery
- Genre: Retail, online
- Founded: 2001
- Founder: Dylan Lauren
- Headquarters: New York City
- Website: dylanscandybar.com

Dylan's Candy Bar is a chain of boutique candy shops and candy supplier currently located in New York City; East Hampton, New York; and Los Angeles, as well as several US airports and in wholesale venues around the globe. It is owned by Dylan Lauren.

== History ==
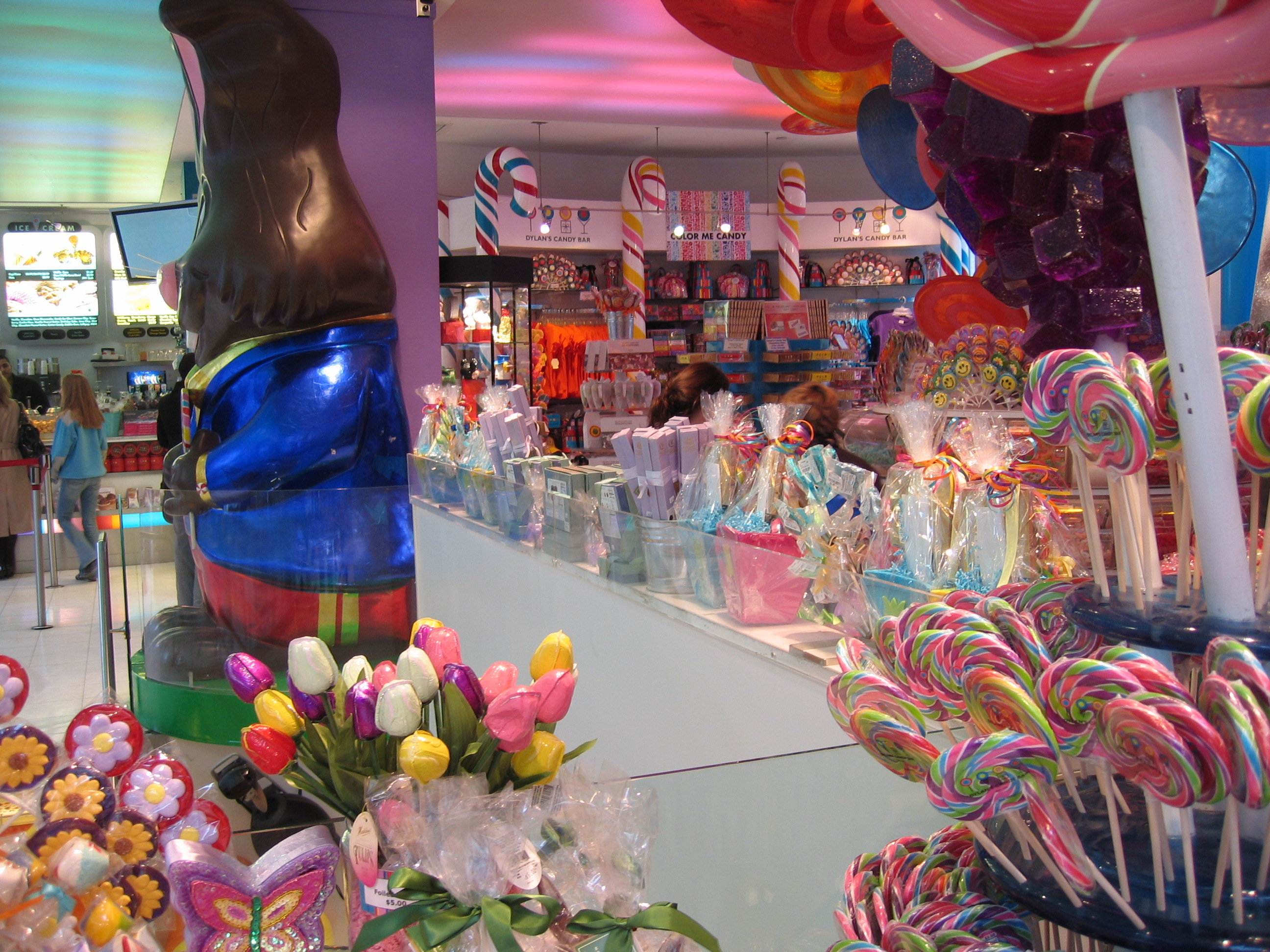
Interior of the New York store

Lauren was inspired to create the store, which is asserted to be the "largest unique candy store in the world", by the Roald Dahl story of Willy Wonka & the Chocolate Factory. Lauren said that her goal was to "merge fashion, art and pop candy culture". It stocks 7,000 candies from around the world. The design and image were produced by original Creative Director Mayumi Ando. Dylan's Candy Bar has also partnered with Holt Renfrew in Vancouver, British Columbia in a co-branding effort.

At its peak, the company had more than twenty locations. The Upper East Side flagship location on 60th Street and 3rd Avenue closed in 2021 after financial difficulties. The locations in Miami Beach and Honolulu also closed.

In 2025, Dylan's announced it had collaborated with Wheel of Fortune by releasing a collection of Wheel-themed candies.
