= Walker (surname) =

- Pronunciation: /ˈwɔːkər/
- Language: English

Origin
- Meaning: A walker, or one who "walked" on raw, damp cloth in order to thicken it.
- Region of origin: Europe

Other names
- Variant forms: Welker, Walcher, Welcker, Wallker, Walkyr, Walkere, Wealcan, Walcere

Walker is an English and Scottish surname.

With over 150,000 bearers in England in 2014, Walker was the 14th most common surname in that country. As of the 2000 U.S. Census, 501,307 people had the surname Walker, making it the 28th most common surname in America. It is the 14th most common surname in Australia, with 26,688 people as of 2007.

== People ==
- Aaron Walker (disambiguation)
- Abby Walker, American actress
- Abi Walker (born 1982), Scottish surgeon and hockey player
- Abraham Beverley Walker (1851–1909), New Brunswick-born lawyer and journalist
- Abram Joseph Walker (1819–1872), American judge
- Ada Hill Walker (1879–1955), British illustrator
- Adam Walker (disambiguation)
- Adele Walker (born 1976), British biathlete
- Admiral Walker (1898–2001), American baseball player
- Adrian Walker (journalist), American journalist
- Adrian Walker (computer scientist), American computer scientist
- Aida Overton Walker (1880–1914), American actress
- Aidee Walker (born 1981), New Zealand actress
- Al Walker (born 1959), American basketball coach
- Alan Walker (disambiguation)
- Alasdair Walker (1956–2019), British doctor
- Albert Walker (disambiguation)
- Albertina Walker (1929–2010), American singer-songwriter
- Aldace F. Walker (1842–1901), American railroad executive
- A'Lelia Walker (1885–1931), American businesswoman
- Alexander Walker (disambiguation)
- Alexia Walker (born 1982), English cricketer
- Alf Walker (footballer) (1887–1961), English footballer
- Alf Walker (rugby union) (1893–1971), South African rugby union footballer
- Alfred Walker (disambiguation)
- Alice Walker (disambiguation)
- Alick Walker (1925–1999), British paleontologist
- Alison Walker, Scottish broadcaster
- Alison Walker (scientist), English physicist
- Alison L. Walker (urban planner), American City Planner
- Alistair Walker (1944–2021), English racing driver
- Alister Walker (born 1982), English squash player
- Allan Walker (disambiguation)
- Alleyne Walker, Grenadian politician
- Alli Walker (born 1989), Canadian singer-songwriter
- Ally Walker (born 1961), American actress
- Allyn Walker, American author
- Alta Walker (1942–2015), American geologist
- Alvin Walker (1954–2022), American football player
- A. Maceo Walker (1909–1994), American businessman
- Amanda Walker (born 1935), English actress
- Amani Walker (born 1989), Jamaican footballer
- Amara Walker (born 1981), American journalist
- Amasa Walker (1799–1875), American politician
- Amelia Himes Walker (1880–1974), American suffragist
- Amy Walker (born 1982), American actress
- Andre Walker (born 1956), American hairstylist
- Andre Walker (designer) (born 1965), British fashion designer
- Andrew Walker (disambiguation)
- Andy Walker (disambiguation)
- Angela Walker (disambiguation)
- Angus Walker (born 1939), Canadian musician
- Ann Walker (disambiguation)
- Anna Walker (disambiguation)
- Annabel Walker, English author
- Anne Walker (disambiguation)
- Annie Walker (disambiguation)
- Annor Walker, Ghanaian football coach
- Anthony Walker (disambiguation)
- Antoine Walker (born 1976), American basketball player
- Antonio Walker (born 1961), Chilean politician and lawyer
- Antony Walker (1934–2023), British army officer
- Antony Walker (conductor), Australian conductor
- April Walker (born 1943), British actress
- Archibald Walker (1858–1945), Scottish rugby union footballer
- Arnetia Walker, American actress
- Arnold Walker (disambiguation)
- Art Walker (disambiguation)
- Arthur Walker (disambiguation)
- A. S. Walker (1826–1896), American judge
- Asa Walker (1845–1916), American admiral
- Ash Walker, English musician
- Ashley Walker (disambiguation)
- Asiedu Walker (born 1955), Ghanaian politician
- Astia Walker (born 1975), Jamaican athlete
- Audrey Walker (1928–2020), American textile artist
- Aundrey Walker (born 1993), American football player
- Austin Walker (1883–1945), American politician
- Ayana Walker (born 1979), American basketball player

=== B ===
- Baldwin Wake Walker (1802–1876), English naval officer
- Barbara Walker (disambiguation)
- Barry Walker (born 1968), American rugby league footballer
- Beau Walker (born 1985), Australian surfer
- Ben Walker (born 1976), American rugby league footballer
- Benjamin Walker (disambiguation)
- Bert Walker (disambiguation)
- Bertrand N. O. Walker (1870–1927), American native poet
- Beth Walker (judge) (born 1965), American judge
- Beth A. Walker, American academic administrator
- Bettina Walker (1837–1893), Irish pianist
- Betty Walker (1928–1982), American actress
- Beverly Walker-Griffea, American public official and academic administrator
- Bill Walker (disambiguation)
- Billy Walker (disambiguation)
- Blythe Walker (born 1968), Bermudian sailor
- Bobby or Bob Walker (disambiguation)
- Bracy Walker (born 1970), American football player
- Brad Walker (disambiguation)
- Brady Walker (1921–2007), American basketball player
- Brandon Walker (born 2002), Australian rules footballer
- Bree Walker (born 1953), American radio personality
- Breeana Walker (born 1992), Australian bobsledder
- Brenda Walker (1957–2024), Australian writer
- Bret Walker (born 1954), Australian barrister
- Brett Walker (1961–2013), American songwriter
- Brian Walker (disambiguation)
- Brígida Walker (1863–1942), Chilean teacher
- Brooke Walker (disambiguation)
- Bruce Walker (disambiguation)
- Bryan Walker (disambiguation)
- Bryant Walker (1856–1936), American malacologist
- Bub Walker (1907–1963), American football player
- Butch Walker (born 1969), American musician
- Byron Walker (born 1960), American football player
- Byron Edmund Walker (1848–1924), Canadian banker

=== C ===
- Cameron Walker (disambiguation)
- Carl Walker (1934–2022), English police inspector
- Carlene M. Walker (born 1947), American politician
- Carmaine Walker (born 1979), English footballer
- Carole Walker, British news correspondent
- Caroline Walker (disambiguation)
- Carolyn Walker (born 1945), American politician
- Cas Walker (1902–1998), American businessman
- Case Walker (born 2003), American actor
- Casey Walker (American football) (born 1989), American football player
- Casey Walker (baseball) (1912–1998), American baseball player
- Casey Walker (director) (born 1975), Canadian film and television director
- Cavon Walker (born 1994), American football player
- Cecil Walker (1924–2007), Northern Irish politician
- Cedric Walker (born 1971), American football player
- Chad N. Walker, American filmmaker
- Challis Walker (1912–2000), American sculptor
- C. Harding Walker (1859–1934), American politician
- Charles Walker (disambiguation)
- Charlotte Walker (1876–1958), American actress
- Charlotte Walker (politician) (born 2004), Australian politician
- Charls Walker (1923–2015), American treasurer
- Ché Walker, English actor
- Cherryl Walker, South African professor
- Cheryl Walker (disambiguation)
- Chet Walker (1940–2024), American basketball player
- Chev Walker (born 1982), English rugby league footballer
- Chevon Walker (born 1987), Jamaican-American football player
- Chico Walker (born 1957), American baseball player
- Chris Walker (disambiguation)
- Christian Walker (born 1991), American baseball player
- Christian Walker (photographer) (1953–2003), American photographer
- Christopher Walker (disambiguation)
- Cindy Walker (1918–2006), American songwriter
- C. J. Walker (disambiguation)
- Claiborne Walker (1899–1927), American fencer
- Clarence Walker (disambiguation)
- Clarissa Walker (died 2011), American activist
- Claud Walker (1934–2019), American politician
- Claudia Walker (born 1996), English footballer
- Clay Walker (born 1969), American singer-songwriter
- Clay Walker (filmmaker) (born 1968), American filmmaker
- Clement Walker (??–1651), English politician
- Cleo Walker (born 1948), American football player
- Clint Walker (1927–2018), American actor
- Clinton Walker (born 1957), Australian writer
- Clifford Walker (1877–1954), American politician
- Clifford Walker (cricketer) (1919–1992), English cricketer
- Clive Walker (disambiguation)
- Cody Walker (disambiguation)
- Colin Walker (disambiguation)
- Colleen Walker (1956–2012), American golfer
- Colonel James Walker (1846–1936), Canadian pioneer
- Colt Walker (gymnast) (born 2001), American artistic gymnast
- Conah Walker (born 1995), English professional boxer
- Connie Walker (disambiguation)
- Constantine Walker (born 1951), Jamaican singer-songwriter
- Cora Walker (1922–2006), American lawyer
- Cora Faith Walker (1984–2022), American politician
- Corey D. B. Walker, American sociologist
- Cory Walker (born 1980), American comic book artist
- Craig Walker (disambiguation)
- Curtis Walker (actor) (born 1961), British actor
- Cyril Walker (disambiguation)

=== D ===
- Daisy Walker (born 2002), Australian rules footballer
- Dallas Walker (born 1988), American football player
- Dan Walker (disambiguation)
- D'Andre Walker (born 1997), American football player
- D'Andrea Walker, American public administrator and government official
- Danielle Walker (disambiguation)
- Danny Walker (born 1999), English rugby league footballer
- Danny Walker (golfer) (born 1995), American golfer
- Danville Walker, Jamaican politician
- Daphne Walker (disambiguation)
- Darby Walker (born 1974), Canadian ice hockey player
- Darius Walker (born 1985), American football player
- Darnell Walker (born 1970), American football player
- Darnell Lamont Walker (born 1982), American writer
- Darrell Walker (born 1961), American basketball coach
- Darren Walker (born 1959), American lawyer and banker
- Darren Walker (cricketer) (born 1966), Australian cricketer
- Darwin Walker (born 1977), American football player
- Daryl Walker (born 1981), American goalball player
- Dave Walker (born 1945), British singer
- Davie Walker (1884–1935), English footballer
- David Walker (disambiguation)
- Dawn Walker, Australian politician
- Dawson Walker (1916–1973), Scottish football manager
- DeAnn Walker (fl. 1980s–2020s), chairman of the Public Utility Commission of Texas
- Delanie Walker (born 1984), American football player
- Deloss Walker (1931–1996), American advertiser
- DeMarcus Walker (born 1994), American football player
- DeMya Walker (born 1977), American basketball player
- Denard Walker (born 1973), American football player
- Denis Walker (1933–2024), Zimbabwean politician
- Denis Walker (activist) (1947–2017), Australian activist
- Dennis Walker (disambiguation)
- Devon Walker (disambiguation)
- Deone Walker (born 2004), American football player
- Derek Walker (disambiguation)
- Derel Walker (born 1991), American football player
- Derrick Walker (born 1945), British auto racing owner
- Derrick Walker (American football) (born 1967), American football player
- Des Walker (born 1965), English footballer
- Devin G. Walker, American physicist
- Devondrick Walker (born 1992), American basketball player
- Devontez Walker (born 2001), American football player
- DeWayne Walker (born 1960), American football coach
- Diana Barnato Walker (1918–2008), British pilot
- Dianne Walker (born 1951), American tap dancer
- Dixie Walker (1910–1982), American baseball player
- Dixie Walker (pitcher) (1887–1965), American baseball player
- Django Walker (born 1981), American singer-songwriter
- Doak Walker (1927–1998), American football player
- Dobby Walker (1919–2009), American lawyer
- Dominic Walker (disambiguation)
- Don Walker (disambiguation)
- Donny Walker (born 1980), American mixed martial artist
- Dora Walker (1890–1980), British boat skipper
- D. Ormonde Walker (1890–1955), American academic administrator
- Dorothy Walker (disambiguation)
- Douglas Walker (disambiguation)
- D. P. Walker (1914–1985), English historian
- Dublin Walker, American politician
- Dugald Stewart Walker (1883–1937), American illustrator
- Duncan Walker (1899–1963), Scottish footballer
- Duncan S. Walker (c. 1793–1835), American lawyer and state legislator
- Duncan Stephen Walker (1841–1912), American brigadier general
- Dwight Walker (born 1959), American football player

=== E ===
- Eamonn Walker (born 1962), British actor
- E. C. Walker (1820–1894), American politician
- Ed Walker (disambiguation)
- Edith Mary Walker (1903–1970), British archaeologist
- Edmund Murton Walker (1877–1969), Canadian entomologist
- Edsall Walker (1910–1997), American baseball player
- Edward Walker (disambiguation)
- Edwin Walker (disambiguation)
- Egan Walker (born 1961), American lawyer
- E. Jean Walker, American academic
- Elaine Walker (disambiguation)
- Eli Walker (born 1992), Welsh rugby union footballer
- Eliza Walker (disambiguation)
- Elizabeth Walker (disambiguation)
- Elkanah Walker (1805–1877), American pioneer
- Ella May Walker (1892–1960), Canadian-American artist
- Elle Walker, American vlogger
- Ellinor Walker (1893–1990), Australian teacher
- Elliott Walker (born 1956), American football player
- Eloise Walker (born 2001), British track athlete
- Elyse Walker (born 1967), American fashion designer
- Emery Walker (1851–1933), English photographer
- Emily Wilson Walker (1904–2007), American doctor
- Emmett H. Walker Jr. (1924–2007), American lieutenant general
- Eric Walker (disambiguation)
- Ernest Walker (disambiguation)
- Erica N. Walker (born 1971), American mathematician
- Ericka Walker (born 1981), American artist
- Ernesto Walker (born 1999), Panamanian footballer
- Erving Walker (born 1990), American basketball player
- Erwin Walker (1917–2008), American policeman
- Esther Walker (1894–1943), American comedian
- Ethan Walker (born 2002), English footballer
- Ethan Walker (lacrosse) (born 1997), Canadian lacrosse player
- Ethel Walker (1861–1951), Scottish painter
- Eva Marie Walker (1895–1981), known as Eva Leigh (artist), English artist
- Evan Walker (disambiguation)

=== F ===
- F. Ann Walker (died 2022), American chemist
- Felix Walker (disambiguation)
- Fiona Walker (born 1944), English actress
- Fiona Walker (author) (born 1969), English author
- Flem Walker, American general
- Foots Walker (born 1951), American basketball player
- Francis Walker (disambiguation)
- François Walker (1888–1951), French gymnast
- Frank Walker (disambiguation)
- Fraser Walker (born 1972), Scottish medley swimmer
- Frederick Walker (disambiguation)
- Fredi Walker (born 1962), American actress
- Freeman Walker (1780–1827), American politician

=== G ===
- Galal Walker (born 1943), American professor
- Garry Walker (born 1974), Scottish conductor
- Gary Walker (disambiguation)
- Gee Walker (1908–1981), American baseball player
- Gene Walker (1893–1924), American motorcycle racer
- Geoff Walker (disambiguation)
- Geordie Walker (1958–2023), English musician
- George Walker (disambiguation)
- Georgia Walker (born 1998), Australian rules footballer
- Georgina Walker (born 1985), English table tennis player
- Gerald Walker (born 1987), American rapper
- Gerran Walker (born 1983), American football player
- Gertrude Walker (1902–1995), American screenwriter
- Gilbert Walker (disambiguation)
- Giles Walker (1946–2020), Scottish-Canadian film director
- Gina Luria Walker, American professor
- Glen Walker (born 1952), American football player
- Glenn Walker (disambiguation)
- Gordie Walker (born 1965), Canadian ice hockey player
- Gordon Walker (disambiguation)
- Graham Walker (disambiguation)
- Gregory Walker (disambiguation)
- Gus Walker (1912–1986), English pilot
- Gwyneth Van Anden Walker (born 1947), American composer

=== H ===
- Hal Walker (1896–1972), American director
- Hamilton Walker (disambiguation)
- Hamish Walker (born 1985), New Zealand politician
- Harold Walker (disambiguation)
- Harriet G. Walker (1841–1917), American hospital administrator
- Harry Walker (disambiguation)
- Hazel Walker (1914–1990), American basketball player
- Hazel M. Walker (1889–1960), American lawyer
- Helen Walker (disambiguation)
- Helene Walker (1904–1994), British trade unionist
- Henderson Walker (1659–1704), English politician
- Henry Walker (disambiguation)
- Herbert Walker (disambiguation)
- Herschel Walker (born 1962), American football player
- Herwig Walker (born 1972), Austrian footballer
- Hezekiah Walker (born 1962), American musician
- Hilda Annetta Walker (1877–1960), English sculptor
- Hilman Walker (1912–1983), American football player
- Hiram Walker (1816–1899), American entrepreneur
- H. M. Walker (1884–1937), American scriptwriter
- Holly Walker (born 1982), New Zealand politician
- Horace Walker (1838–1908), English mountaineer
- Horace Walker (basketball) (1937–2001), American basketball player
- Horatio Walker (1858–1938), Canadian painter
- Hoss Walker (1904–1984), American baseball player
- Hovenden Walker (1656–1728), British naval officer
- Howard Walker (disambiguation)
- Hub Walker (1906–1982), American baseball player
- Hugh Walker (disambiguation)
- Hunter Walker (born 1984), American reporter
- Hunter Walker (curler) (born 2002), New Zealand curler

=== I ===
- Ian Walker (disambiguation)
- Ida Walker (1876–1968), American politician
- Ignacio Walker (born 1956), Chilean politician
- Ignacio Pérez Walker (born 1948), Chilean politician
- Imogen Walker, British politician
- Isaac Walker (disambiguation)
- Ivy Walker (1911–?), English sprinter
- Izannah Walker (1817–1888), American inventor

=== J ===
- Jabari Walker (born 2002), American basketball player
- Jabez K. Walker, American politician
- Jack Walker (disambiguation)
- Jackie Walker (disambiguation)
- Jahdae Walker (born 2002), American football player
- Jailin Walker (born 2003), American football player
- Jake Walker (disambiguation)
- Jalon Walker (born 2004), American football player
- Jamall Walker (born 1977), American basketball coach
- Jamar K. Walker, American lawyer
- James Walker (disambiguation)
- Jamie Walker (disambiguation)
- Jamil Walker (born 1981), American soccer player
- Jane Walker (disambiguation)
- Janet Walker, Canadian scholar
- Janet Walker (costumier) (1850–1940), Australian businesswoman
- Janice B. Walker, American mathematician
- Jarace Walker (born 2003), American basketball player
- Jarrett Walker (born 1962), American transit consultant
- Jarvis Walker (basketball) (born 1966), American basketball player
- Jasmine Walker (born 1998), American basketball player
- Jason Walker (disambiguation)
- Javon Walker (born 1978), American football player
- Jay Walker (disambiguation)
- Jayden Walker (born 1996), Italian rugby league footballer
- J. Brent Walker (born 1950), American minister and lawyer
- J. C. Walker (disambiguation)
- Jean Nellie Miles Walker (1878–1918), Australian nurse
- Jearl Walker (born 1945), American physicist
- Jeff Walker (disambiguation)
- Jefferson Cobb Walker (1845–?), American politician
- Jemma Walker, English actress
- Jenny Walker (born 1956), Australian tennis player
- Jenonne R. Walker (born 1934), American ambassador
- Jerald Walker, American writer
- Jeremy Walker (disambiguation)
- Jermaine Walker (1977–2024), American basketball player
- Jerry Walker (1939–2024), American baseball player
- Jerry Jeff Walker (1942–2020), American singer-songwriter
- Jesse Walker (born 1970), American editor
- Jesse Walker (Methodist) (1766–1835), American minister
- Jessica Walker (born 1990), British canoeist
- Jessie Walker (born 1994), English cyclist
- J. H. Walker (1860–1947), American land commissioner
- Jimmie Walker (born 1947), American actor and comedian
- Jimmy Walker (disambiguation)
- Joan Walker (1908–1997), Canadian writer
- Joaquín Garrigues Walker (1933–1980), Spanish politician
- Joe Walker (disambiguation)
- Joel Walker (disambiguation)
- John Walker (disambiguation)
- Johnnie Walker (disambiguation)
- Jonathan Walker (disambiguation)
- Johnny "Big Moose" Walker (1927–1999), American blues pianist and organist
- Johnny Walker Jr. (born 2001), American football player
- Jon Walker (born 1985), American musician
- Jordan Walker (disambiguation)
- Joseph Walker (disambiguation)
- Josh Walker (disambiguation)
- Joshua Walker (disambiguation)
- Josiah Walker (1761–1831), Scottish author
- Josie Walker (born 1970), Northern Irish actress
- Joyce Walker (born 1961/1962), American basketball player
- J. P. Walker (born 1976), American snowboarder
- J. Samuel Walker, American historian
- Judy L. Walker, American mathematician
- Julian Walker (born 1986), Swiss ice hockey player
- Julian F. Walker (1929–2018), British cartographer
- Julie Walker (disambiguation)
- Julius Waring Walker Jr. (1927–2003), American diplomat
- Junior Walker (1931–1995), American musician and singer
- Justin Walker (disambiguation)

=== K ===
- Kani Walker (born 2003), American football player
- Kara Walker (born 1969), American artist
- Kara Odom Walker, American physician
- Kareem Walker (born 1998), American football player
- Karen Walker (disambiguation)
- Kate Walker (disambiguation)
- Katherine Walker (disambiguation)
- Katie Walker (born 1969), British furniture designer
- Katie Walker (netball) (born 1978), Australian netball player
- Kathryn Walker (born 1943), American actress
- Keenan A. Walker, American medical researcher
- Keenyn Walker (born 1990), American baseball player
- Keith Walker (disambiguation)
- Kelley Walker (born 1969), American artist
- Kemba Walker (born 1990), American basketball player
- Kenneth Walker (disambiguation)
- Kenney Walker (born 1988), American soccer player
- Kenronte Walker (born 1990), American football player
- Kent Walker, American corporate executive
- Kenyatta Walker (born 1979), American football player
- Kerry Walker (born 1948), Australian actress
- Kev Walker, British comic artist
- Kevin Walker (disambiguation)
- Kim Walker (disambiguation)
- Kirk Walker, American softball coach
- Kristen Walker, Australian lawyer
- Kristina Walker (born 1996), Canadian rower
- Kurt Walker (disambiguation)
- Kyle Walker (born 1990), English footballer
- Kyle Walker (politician), American politician
- Kyree Walker (born 2000), American basketball player

=== L ===
- Lamar Walker (born 2000), Jamaican footballer
- Lance Walker (born 1955), Australian rugby union footballer
- Lance E. Walker (born 1972), American judge
- Lancelot Walker (1829–1907), New Zealand politician
- Landry Walker (born 1971), American writer
- Langston Walker (born 1979), American football player
- Larrington Walker (1946–2017), Jamaican-British actor
- Larry Walker (disambiguation)
- Lary Walker, American neuroscientist
- Latrice Walker (born 1979), American politician
- Laudie Walker (1898–1962), American baseball player
- Laura Walker (disambiguation)
- Lauren Walker (born 1989), English footballer
- Laurie Walker (disambiguation)
- LaVar Walker, American comedian
- Lawrence Walker (disambiguation)
- Leanne Walker (born 1968), New Zealand basketball player
- Lee Walker (born 1976), Welsh snooker player
- Lee Walker (footballer) (born 1973), Australian rules footballer
- Len Walker (born 1944), English footballer
- Léon Walker (1937–2006), Swiss footballer
- Leonard Walker (1877–1964), British painter
- Leroy Walker (disambiguation)
- Les Walker (bishop), South African bishop
- Les Walker (politician) (born 1965), Australian politician
- Lesley Walker (1945–2025), British film editor
- Leslie Walker (disambiguation)
- Lewis L. Walker (1873–1944), American politician
- Lewis Walker (footballer) (born 1999), English footballer
- Liam Walker (born 1988), Gibraltarian footballer
- Lillian Walker (1887–1975), American actress
- Lillian Walker (politician) (1923–2016), American politician
- Lily Walker (born 2002), English field hockey player
- Linda T. Walker (born 1960), American judge
- Lisa Walker (disambiguation)
- Livingstone Walker (1879–1940), English cricketer
- Liza Walker (born 1972), English actress
- Lloyd Walker (rugby union) (born 1959), Australian rugby union footballer
- Lonnie Walker (born 1998), American basketball player
- Lorna Walker, British historian
- Lorraine Walker, Australian judge
- Lou Ann Walker, American author
- Louie Walker (born 1953), American football player
- L. T. Walker, American football coach
- Lucas Walker (born 1984), Australian basketball player
- Lucius M. Walker (1829–1863), American soldier
- Lucy Walker (disambiguation)
- Luise Walker (1910–1998), Austrian composer
- Luke Walker (disambiguation)
- Luther Walker (1864–1903), English footballer
- Lyman Walker (1799–1886), American politician
- Lyman Fessenden Walker (1836–1920), American shipbuilder
- Lyndsay Walker (born 1974), Australian cricketer
- Lynne Walker (disambiguation)

=== M ===
- Mabel Walker (disambiguation)
- Mack Walker (1929–2021), American historian
- Madam C. J. Walker (1867–1919), American entrepreneur
- Maggie L. Walker (1864–1934), American teacher and businesswoman
- Mandy Walker (born 1963), Australian cinematographer
- Magnus Walker (born 1967), British fashion designer
- Malcolm Walker (disambiguation)
- Mallory Walker (1935–2014), American musician
- Mamie Dowd Walker (1880–1960), American judge
- Marcedes Walker (born 1986), American basketball player
- Marco Walker (born 1970), Swiss footballer
- Marcus Walker (disambiguation)
- Marcy Walker (born 1961), American actress
- Margaret Walker (disambiguation)
- Marietta Walker (1834–1930), American academic administrator
- Marilyn Walker, American computer scientist
- Marion Walker, Scottish activist
- Mark Walker (disambiguation)
- Marquis Walker (born 1972), American football player
- Marquise Walker (born 1978), American football player
- Martin Walker (disambiguation)
- Marty Walker (baseball) (1899–1978), American baseball player
- Mary Walker (disambiguation)
- Matías Walker (born 1973), Chilean politician
- Matt Walker (disambiguation)
- Matthew Walker (disambiguation)
- Max Walker (1948–2016), Australian cricketer
- Max Walker (cyclist) (born 2001), British cyclist
- Maxine Walker (born 1962), British-Jamaican photographer
- Meadow Walker (born 1998), American model
- Megan Walker (born 1998), American basketball player
- Mel Walker (disambiguation)
- Melaine Walker (born 1983), Jamaican hurdler
- Melissa Walker (born 1977), American author
- Melvina Walker (born 1874), British suffragette and working class activist
- Meriwether Lewis Walker (1869–1947), American brigadier general
- Merv Walker (born 1952), Canadian football player
- Michael Walker (disambiguation)
- Mick Walker (disambiguation)
- Mike Walker (disambiguation)
- Miles Walker (born 1940), English businessman and politician
- Miles Walker (tennis) (born 1961), American tennis player
- Mitch Walker (disambiguation)
- M. J. Walker (born 1998), American basketball player
- Molly Walker (footballer) (1898–?), English footballer
- Molly Manning Walker (born 1993), English cinematographer
- Monica Walker (born 1987), American curler
- Monica Walker (illustrator), British illustrator
- Mort Walker (1923–2018), American cartoonist
- Moses B. Walker (1819–1895), American general
- Moses Fleetwood Walker (1856–1924), American baseball player
- Murdoch Walker (died 1580), Scottish stonemason
- Murray Walker (1923–2021), English journalist
- Murphy Walker (born 1999), Scottish rugby union footballer
- Mykal Walker (born 1997), American football player
- Mysterious Walker (1884–1958), American athlete and coach

=== N ===
- Nancy Walker (1922–1992), American actress
- Naomi Ruiz Walker (born 1992), Spanish artistic gymnast
- Natalie Walker, American vocalist
- Natalie Walker (academic), New Zealand academic
- Natalie Walker (actress), Australian actress
- Nathan Walker (disambiguation)
- Nefertiti A. Walker, American academic administrator
- Neil Walker (disambiguation)
- Nell W. Walker (1888–1962), American politician from West Virginia
- Nella Walker (1886–1971), American actress
- Nellie Walker (1874–1973), American sculptor
- Nellie Craig Walker (1881–1969), American teacher
- Neva Walker (born 1971), American politician
- Nick Walker (disambiguation)
- Nicky Walker (born 1962), Scottish footballer
- Nico Walker (born 1985), American author
- Nicola Walker (born 1970), English actress
- Nicole Walker (writer), American writer
- Niel Walker (1895–1960), British cricketer
- Nigel Walker (disambiguation)
- Nikki Walker (born 1982), Scottish rugby union footballer
- Norma Ford Walker (1893–1968), Canadian scientist
- Norma O. Walker (1928–2023), American politician
- Norman Walker (disambiguation)

=== O ===
- Obadiah Walker (1616–1699), English academic
- Obie Walker (1911–1989), American boxer
- Olene Walker (1930–2015), American politician
- Oliver Walker (disambiguation)
- Ordell Walker, American football coach
- Orris George Walker (1942–2015), American bishop
- Oscar Walker (1854–1889), American baseball player
- Overture Walker (born 1980), American politician
- Owen Walker, New Zealand computer hacker

=== P ===
- Paddy Walker (1916–2015), New Zealand teacher
- Pamela Gaye Walker, American actress
- Pat, Patric or Patrick Walker (disambiguation)
- Patricia Stilwell Walker, American philatelist
- Patricio Walker (born 1969), Chilean politician
- Paul Walker (disambiguation)
- Peahead Walker (1899–1970), American football and baseball coach
- Percy Walker (1812–1880), American politician
- Pete Walker (baseball) (born 1969), American baseball coach and player
- Peter Walker (disambiguation)
- Phil Walker (disambiguation)
- Phillip Walker (disambiguation)
- Pinkney H. Walker (1815–1885), American jurist
- P. J. Walker (born 1995), American football player
- Platt D. Walker (1849–1923), justice of the North Carolina Supreme Court
- Polly Walker (born 1966), English actress
- Purcy Walker (born 1951), American politician

=== Q ===
- Quay Walker (born 2000), American football player
- Quentin Walker (born 1961), American football player
- Quock Walker (1753–?), American slave

=== R ===
- Rachel Walker (disambiguation)
- Ralph Walker (disambiguation)
- Ramon Walker (born 1979), American football player
- Rana Walker, American psychologist
- Randy Walker (disambiguation)
- Ranginui Walker (1932–2016), New Zealand academic and writer
- Rasheed Walker (born 2000), American football player
- Ray Walker (disambiguation)
- Rebecca Walker (disambiguation)
- Regan Walker (born 1996), English footballer
- Reggie Walker (disambiguation)
- Reuben Lindsay Walker (1827–1890), American general
- Rhys Walker (born 1994), English badminton player
- Richard Walker (disambiguation)
- Rick Walker (born 1955), American football player
- Ricky Walker (born 1996), American football player
- Rob Walker (disambiguation)
- Robert Walker (disambiguation)
- Robin Walker (disambiguation)
- Rod Walker (born 1976), American football player
- Roderick Walker (1932–2008), British military officer
- Rodney Walker (disambiguation)
- Roger Walker (disambiguation)
- Roland Walker (born 1970), British army officer
- Roman Walker (born 2000), Welsh cricketer
- Ronald Walker (disambiguation)
- Rose A. Walker (1879–1942), Australian painter
- Rosa Kershaw Walker (died 1909), American author
- Rosie Walker (born 1957), American basketball player
- Russel Erwood (born 1981), English entertainer
- Roslyn Walker (curator), American curator
- Rowan Walker (born 1970), Australian runner
- Roy Walker (disambiguation)
- R. T. Walker (1914–?), American baseball player
- R. Tracy Walker (1939–2019), American politician
- Rube Walker (1926–1992), American baseball player
- Rudolph Walker (born 1939), Trinidadian actor
- Ruel C. Walker (1910–1998), American judge
- Russ Walker (disambiguation)
- Russell Walker (1842–1922), English cricketer
- Ryan Walker (disambiguation)
- Ryley Walker (born 1989), American singer-songwriter
- Rysa Walker (born 1961), American writer

=== S ===
- Sally Walker (disambiguation)
- Sam Walker (disambiguation)
- Samaki Walker (born 1976), American basketball player
- Sammy Walker (disambiguation)
- Sampson Walker (1843–1933), English-Canadian businessman
- Samuel Walker (disambiguation)
- Sandy Walker (born 1942), American artist
- Sara Imari Walker, American physicist
- Sarah Walker (disambiguation)
- Sayer Walker (1748–1826), English physician
- Scott Walker (disambiguation)
- Sean Walker (disambiguation)
- Sears Cook Walker (1805–1853), American astronomer
- Sebo Walker (born 1988), American skateboarder
- Selma Walker (1925–1997), American social worker
- Seth Walker (born 1972), American guitarist
- Shane Walker (disambiguation)
- Shannon Walker (born 1965), American physicist
- Shannon Walker (rugby) (born 1988), Australian rugby union footballer
- Sharon Walker, American environmental engineer
- Shaun Walker (disambiguation)
- Shelby Walker (1975–2006), American boxer
- Sherron Walker (born 1956), American athlete
- Shiloh Walker (born 1976), American author
- Shirley Walker (1945–2006), American composer
- Simon Walker (disambiguation)
- Skeeter Werner Walker (1933–2001), American skier
- S. Lynne Walker, American journalist
- Solomon Walker, American guitarist
- Sonny Walker, British actor
- Sophie Walker (born 1971), British activist
- Sophie Walker (golfer) (born 1984), English golfer
- Speed Walker (1898–1959), American baseball player
- Speedy Walker (1906–2004), American basketball player
- Stanley Walker (disambiguation)
- Steele Walker (born 1996), American baseball player
- Stéphane Walker (born 1990), Swiss figure skater
- Stephanie Walker (born 1994), Australian rules footballer
- Stephen Walker (disambiguation)
- Steve Walker (disambiguation)
- Stewart Walker (disambiguation)
- Struan Walker (born 2002), Scottish field hockey player
- Stuart Walker (disambiguation)
- Sue Walker (disambiguation)
- Sullivan Walker (1946–2012), Trinidadian actor
- Summer Walker (born 1996), American singer-songwriter
- Susan Walker (disambiguation)
- Suzanne Walker, American microbiologist
- Syd Walker (1886–1945), British actor
- Sydney Walker (1921–1994), American actor
- Sylford Walker (born 1955), Jamaican singer
- Sylvia Walker (1937–2004), American professor

=== T ===
- Taijuan Walker (born 1992), American baseball player
- Tamara Walker (born 1966), American singer-songwriter
- Tanya Walker (disambiguation)
- Tawee Walker (born 2001), American football player
- Taylor Walker (disambiguation)
- T. B. Walker (1840–1929), American businessman
- T-Bone Walker (1910–1975), American musician
- Ted Walker (1934–2004), English poet
- Terence Walker (born 1935), British politician
- Terri Walker (born 1979), English singer-songwriter
- Terry Walker (disambiguation)
- Thekla Walker (born 1969), German politician
- Thelma Walker (born 1957), British politician
- Theresa Walker (1807–1876), Australian sculptor
- Thomas Walker (disambiguation)
- Timothy Walker (disambiguation)
- Tippy Walker (born 1947), American actress
- Tirame Walker (born 1975), American basketball player
- Tisha Walker (born 1975), American figure skater
- Todd Walker (born 1973), American baseball player
- Tonette Walker (born 1955), American social figure
- Toni Walker (born 1952), American politician
- Tonja Walker (born 1960), American soap opera actress
- Tony Walker (American football) (born 1968), American football player
- Tony Walker (outfielder) (born 1959), American baseball player
- Tony Walker (Negro leagues), American baseball player
- Tracy Walker (American football) (born 1995), American football player
- Tracy Walker (serial killer) (born 1964), American serial killer
- Travis Walker (born 1979), American boxer
- Travon Walker (born 2000), American football player
- Tray Walker (1992–2016), American football player
- Trent Walker, American sound engineer
- Trevor Walker, Barbadian politician
- Tricia Walker (1964–2018), British author
- Tristan Walker (born 1991), Canadian luger
- Tristan Walker (entrepreneur), American corporate executive
- Tristen Walker (born 1984), Australian rules footballer
- Ty Walker (disambiguation)
- Tyler Walker (disambiguation)
- Tyr Walker (born 2003), Canadian soccer player
- Tyrunn Walker (born 1990), American football player
- Tyson Walker (born 2000), American basketball player

=== U ===
- Uncle Homer Walker (1898 or c. 1904–1980), American banjo player John Homer Walker
- Uroyoán Walker, American academic administrator

=== V ===
- Val Walker (1890–1969), English magician
- Val Joe Walker (1930–2013), American football player
- Vance Walker (born 1987), American football player
- Vanessa Siddle Walker, American professor
- Vaughn Walker (born 1944), American judge
- V. E. Walker (1837–1906), English cricketer
- Vernon L. Walker (1894–1948), American cinematographer
- Vicki Walker (born 1956), American politician
- Victor B. Walker (1864–?), American lawyer and businessman
- Victoria Walker (born 2001), known as PinkPantheress, British singer, songwriter, and record producer
- Vincent Walker (born 1980), American singer
- Virginia Walker (1916–1946), American film actress
- Vordell Walker (born 1982), American professional wrestler

=== W ===
- Wade Walker (1923–2013), American football player
- Wally Walker (born 1954), American basketball player
- Walt Walker (1860–1922), American baseball player
- Walter Walker (disambiguation)
- Walton Walker (1889–1950), American general
- Waurine Walker (1908–1987), American educator
- Wayne Walker (disambiguation)
- W. Danforth Walker, American philatelist
- Weldy Walker (1860–1937), American baseball player
- Wendell Walker (born 1952), American politician
- Wendy Walker (born 1951), American writer
- Wendy Jane Walker (born 1964), English actress
- Wickliffe Walker (born 1946), American canoeist
- Wilbert Walker (born 1985), Jamaican triple jumper
- William Walker (disambiguation)
- Willis Walker (1892–1991), English footballer
- Williston Walker (1860–1922), American historian
- Winifred Walker (1882–1965), English artist
- Wirt Dexter Walker (1860–1899), American lawyer
- Wyatt Tee Walker (1928–2018), American pastor and activist

=== Y ===
- Yvonne Walker (born 1959), American labor union leader

=== Z ===
- Zain Walker (born 2002), English footballer
- Zena Walker (1934–2003), English actress

== Fictional characters ==
- Allen Walker, in the manga series D.Gray-man
- Brenda Walker (Emmerdale), on the soap opera Emmerdale
- Captain Martin Walker, main character of the video game Spec Ops: The Line
- Dexter Walker, on the soap opera Home and Away
- Ed Walker (Ninjago), in Ninjago
- Edna Walker, in Ninjago
- Gennie Walker, on the soap opera Emmerdale
- Indi Walker, on the soap opera Home and Away
- Jay Walker (Ninjago), in Ninjago
- Julia Walker, on the television series Brothers & Sisters
- Karen Walker, on the sitcom series Will & Grace
- Kate Walker, main character of the Syberia video game series
- Lily Walker, on the soap opera Doctors
- Margaret Walker (EastEnders), on the British soap opera EastEnders
- Molly Walker (Heroes), on the drama series Heroes
- Nicole Walker, on the soap opera Days of Our Lives
- Nora Walker, on the television series Brothers & Sisters
- Patsy Walker, from the comic series Marvel Comics
- Private Walker, on the television series Dad's Army
- Renee Walker, on the television series 24
- Rinslet Walker, from the manga series Black Cat (manga)
- Saint Walker, from the comic series DC Comics
- Sarah Walker, on the television series Chuck (TV series)
- Sid Walker, on the soap opera Home and Away

== See also ==
- Walker (given name)
- Walker (disambiguation)
- Admiral Walker (disambiguation)
- Attorney General Walker (disambiguation)
- Captain Walker (disambiguation)
- General Walker (disambiguation)
- Governor Walker (disambiguation)
- Judge Walker (disambiguation)
- Justice Walker (disambiguation)
- Lord Walker (disambiguation)
- Senator Walker (disambiguation)
