= Dennis Walker =

Dennis or Denis Walker may refer to:

- Dennis Walker (footballer) (1944–2003), English footballer
- Dennis Walker (swimmer) (1913–1984), Canadian swimmer
- Dennis Walker (banker) (1943–1987), American banker accused of racketeering charges
- Denis Walker (1933–2024), Rhodesian politician
- Denis Walker (activist) (1946–2017), Aboriginal Australian activist

== See also ==
- Walker (surname)
