= William Saunders (physician) =

Scottish physician (1743–1817)

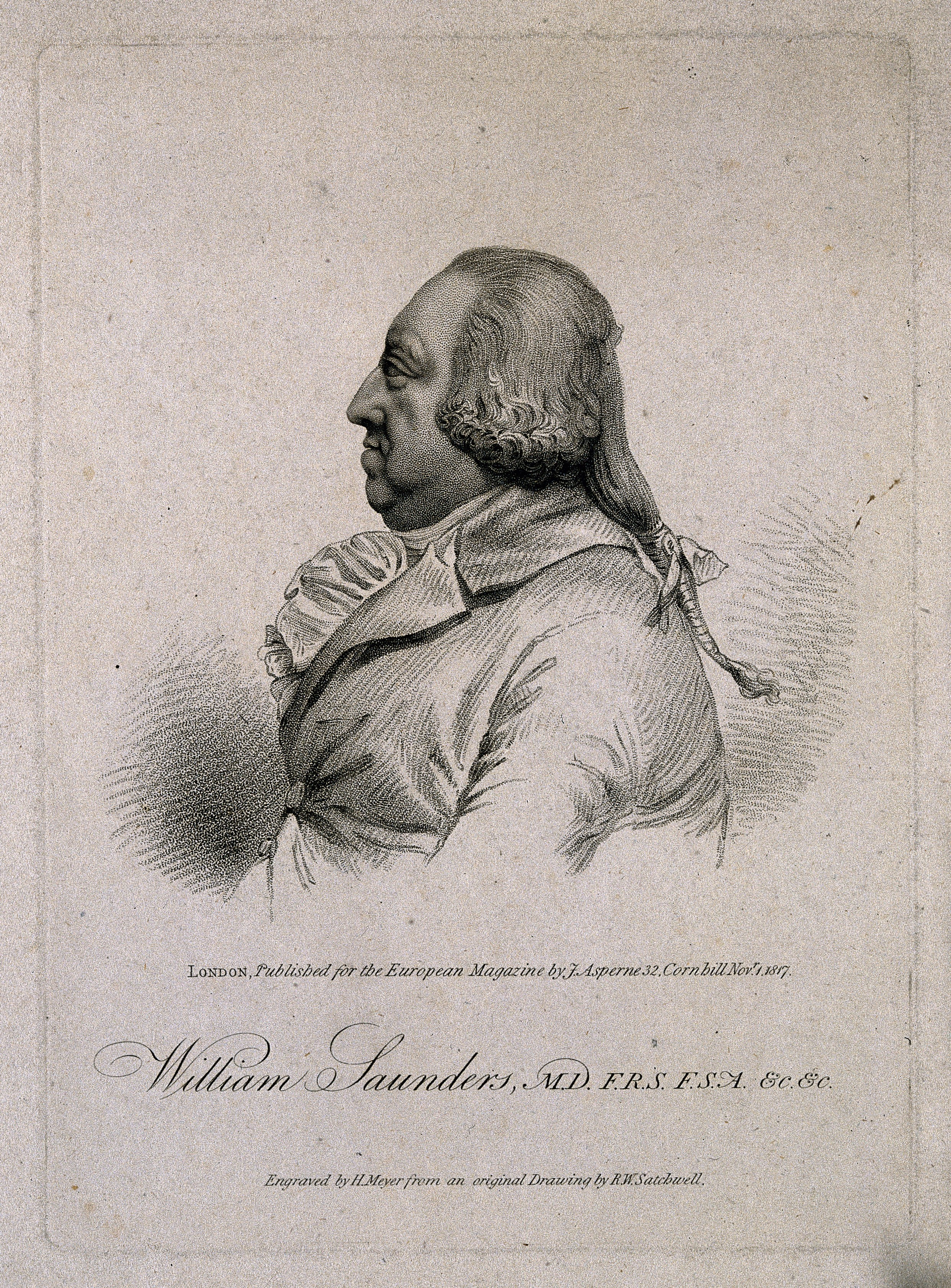
- William Saunders
- Born: 9 July 1743; Banff, Scotland
- Died: 4 June 1817 (aged 73); Enfield, London, England
- Occupation: Physician
- Title: FRS; FRSE; FRCP

William Saunders FRS FRSE (9 July 1743 – 4 June 1817) was a Scottish physician who was the first president of the Royal Medical and Chirurgical Society.

== Life ==
William Saunders was born on 9 July 1743 in Banff, Aberdeenshire, the son of Dr James Saunders MD. From 1755 to 1759 he took a science degree at Marischal College in Aberdeen (the usual age to attend university in the 18th century was 14).

He studied medicine under Dr William Cullen at the University of Edinburgh and became Cullen's assistant. Writing a thesis on the medical use of antimony, he gained his doctorate (MD) in 1765.

He moved to London, where he first taught chemistry and pharmacy in private schools. He came to fame by contesting Sir George Baker's theory that the high levels of colic in Devonshire derived from over-consumption of cider, instead proving, by experiment that it came from the dissolving of lead during the cider-making process, and was lead-poisoning rather than alcohol-poisoning.

In 1769 he was made a Licenciate of the Royal College of Physicians and in 1770 became a physician at Guy's Hospital, where he developed and delivered courses of medical lectures.

In 1790 he was elected a Fellow of the Royal College of Physicians, to whom he delivered the Goulstonian Lecture of 1792 on diseases of the liver. In 1792 he was elected a Fellow of the Royal Society of Edinburgh. His proposers were Daniel Rutherford, William Wright and Andrew Duncan, the elder.

He delivered the Harveian Oration of 1796. He was elected a Fellow of the Royal Society in 1793 and was also a Fellow of the Royal Society of Edinburgh, a Fellow of the Anatomical Society and a member of the Geological Society. He left Guy's Hospital in 1802, proposing Dr William Babington as his successor.

He was a founding member of the Royal Medical and Chirurgical Society and in 1805 was elected their first president.

He was mentor in London to Rev Dr Sayer Walker.

In 1807 he was appointed Physician Extraordinaire to Prince George Augustus Frederick, who became the Prince Regent in 1811 (and was later to become King George IV). During his working life he published a number of works on a variety of medical subjects.

He retired in 1814 and died in Enfield, London on 4 June 1817. He is buried in Enfield Parish Churchyard.

== Publications ==
- A Thesis on Antimony (1766)
- A Treatise on the Devonshire Colic (1767)
- On the Red Bark
- On Liver Diseases
- On Mineral Waters: Their Uses and Abuses
- On the Use and Abuse of Mercury on Liver and Other Diseases

== Family ==
He was twice married and had four sons and two daughters.
