= Cheryl Walker =

Cheryl Walker may refer to:

- Cheryl Walker (actress) (1918–1971), American actress
- Cheryl Lyn Walker, American biologist

== See also ==
- Cherryl Walker, South African professor
