= Alfred Walker =

Alfred Walker may refer to:

- Alfred Walker (cricketer) (1827–1870), English cricketer
- Alfred Walker (fencer) (1901–1983), American Olympic fencer
- Alfred Walker (rugby union) (c. 1893–1958), Australian rugby union player
- Alf Walker (footballer) (1887–1961), English footballer
- Alf Walker (rugby union) (1893–1971), South African international rugby union player
