= Martin Walker =

Martin or Marty Walker may refer to:

- Martin Walker (actor) (1901–1955), British film actor
- Martin Walker (football director), former director of Hull City football club
- Martin Walker (reporter), British reporter and mystery writer
- Captain Martin Walker, main character of 2012 video game Spec Ops: The Line
- Marty Walker (baseball) (1899–1978), American baseball pitcher
- Marty Walker (Shortland Street), a fictional character on the New Zealand soap opera Shortland Street

== See also ==
- Martin Walkyier (born 1967), English singer
