= Graham Walker =

Graham Walker may refer to:

- Graham Walker (motorcyclist) (1896–1962), English motorcycle racer, broadcaster and journalist
- Graham Walker (academic), American academic, professor, and president of Patrick Henry College
- Graham Walker (editor) (1946–2016), editor of The World Today magazine from 1995 to 2010
- Graham C. Walker (born 1948), American biologist
- Graham Walker (footballer) (born 1935), former Australian rules footballer
- Graham Norton (born 1963), real name Graham Walker, comedian

== See also ==
- Walker (surname)
