= Rodney Walker =

Rodney Walker may refer to:

- Rodney Walker (architect) (1910–1986), American architect
- Sir Rodney Walker (rugby league) (born 1943), British sports administrator
- Rodney Walker (New Zealand), New Zealand rugby league international

== See also ==
- Rod Walker (born 1976), American football player
