= Joel Walker =

Joel Walker may refer to:

- Joel Walker (snooker player) (born 1994), English snooker player
- Joel Walker (sculptor), English sculptor

== See also ==
- Joel Walker Sweeney (1810–1860), American musician and early blackface minstrel performer
- Joe Walker (disambiguation)
