= Helen Walker (disambiguation) =

Helen Walker (1920–1968) was an American movie actress of the 1940s.

Helen Walker may also refer to:

- Helen M. Walker (1891–1983), statistician and educational researcher
- Helen Roberts (1912–2010), singer and actress, sometimes known as Helen Roberts Walker
- Helen J. Walker (1953–2017), UK space scientist
- Helen Walker-Hill (1936–2013), Canadian musical artist
- Dr. Helen Walker (previously Trent), a fictional character from the UK television series Heartbeat, see List of Heartbeat cast members
