= Art Walker =

Art Walker may refer to:

- Art Walker (gridiron football) (1933–1973), American gridiron football player
- Art Walker (triple jumper) (born 1941), American triple jumper

== See also ==
- Arthur Walker (disambiguation)
