= Keith Walker =

Keith Walker may refer to:

== Sports ==
- Keith Walker (wrestler) (born 1978), American professional wrestler
- Keith Walker (footballer) (born 1966), Scottish footballer
- Keith Walker (referee) (1930–1996), English football referee
- Keith Walker (basketball) (born 1958), college basketball head coach for Delaware State University
- Keith Walker (cricketer) (1922–1989), English cricketer
- Keith Walker (baseball) in 1979 College World Series

== Others ==
- Keith Walker (writer) (1935–1996), American writer, producer, and actor
- Keith Walker (cinematographer) on Best Friend Forgotten
- Keith Walker (producer) on Midnight Oil (album)
