= Captain Walker =

Captain Walker may refer to:

- Captain Frederic John Walker (1896–1944), a Royal Navy officer during World War II
- Captain Walker, a character in The Who's Tommy
- Captain Walker, a character in Mad Max Beyond Thunderdome
- Captain Martin Walker, main character of Spec Ops: The Line
- John Walker (Marvel Cinematic Universe), a character in the Marvel Cinematic Universe

== See also ==
- Joseph R. Walker (1798—1876), an American mountain man and scout
