= Gilbert Walker =

Gilbert Walker may refer to:

- Gilbert Walker (cricketer) (1888–1952), English cricketer
- Gilbert Walker (physicist) (1868–1958), English physicist
- Gilbert Carlton Walker (1833–1885), American politician
