= Harry Walker (rugby union, born 1928) =

South African rugby union player

- Full name: Henry Newton Walker
- Born: 1 July 1928 Durban, South Africa
- Died: 6 August 2008 (aged 80)
- Height: 1.89 m (6 ft 2 in)
- Weight: 103 kg (227 lb)
- School: Kearsney College

Rugby union career
- Position: Prop
Provincial / State sides
Years	Team	Apps	(Points)
- Natal
- Orange Free State
- Western Transvaal
International career
Years	Team	Apps	(Points)
1953–56	South Africa	4	(0)

Henry Newton Walker (1 July 1928 – 6 August 2008) was a South African international rugby union player.

Born in Durban, Walker was the son of 1920s Springboks forward Alf Walker and attended Kearsney College, from where he earned Natal Schools representative honours. His uncle Henry was also a Springbok.

Walker, a sturdy prop, started out with Berea Rivers and made his debut for Natal in 1947. While with his next club Odendaalsrus, Walker gained a maiden Springboks call up for a Test match against the touring Wallabies, deputising for Chris Koch in front of a home town crowd at Kingsmead. He represented Orange Free State during this period, but was based in Potchefstroom by the time he returned for the Springboks in 1956. Touring Australia and New Zealand, Walker played in three of a possible six Test matches, all with Jaap Bekker as his tight–head.

An accountant, Walker remained involved in rugby as the 1st XV coach at Potchefstroom Boys' High School.

== See also ==
- List of South Africa national rugby union players
