= Tyler Walker =

Tyler Walker may refer to:

- Tyler Walker (American football) (born 1989), American football player
- Tyler Walker (baseball) (born 1976), American baseball pitcher
- Tyler Walker (footballer) (born 1996), English association footballer
- Tyler Walker (racing driver) (born 1979), American racing-car driver
- Tyler Walker (skier) (born 1986), American skier

== See also ==
- Walker (surname)
- Walker (disambiguation)
