= Derek Walker =

Derek Walker may refer to:

- Derek Walker (architect) (1929–2015), British architect and planner
- Derek Walker (cricketer) (born 1959), New Zealand cricketer
- Derek Walker (footballer) (born 1966), Scottish footballer
- Derek Walker (gridiron football) (born 1986), American football player

== See also ==
- Derek Walker-Smith, Baron Broxbourne (1910–1992), British politician
