= J. C. Walker =

J. C. Walker may refer to:

- Jefferson Cobb Walker (1845–?), minister, laborer, and state legislator in Mississippi, U.S.
- John Charles Walker (1893–1994), American agricultural scientist
