= Nolan North =

American actor (born 1970)

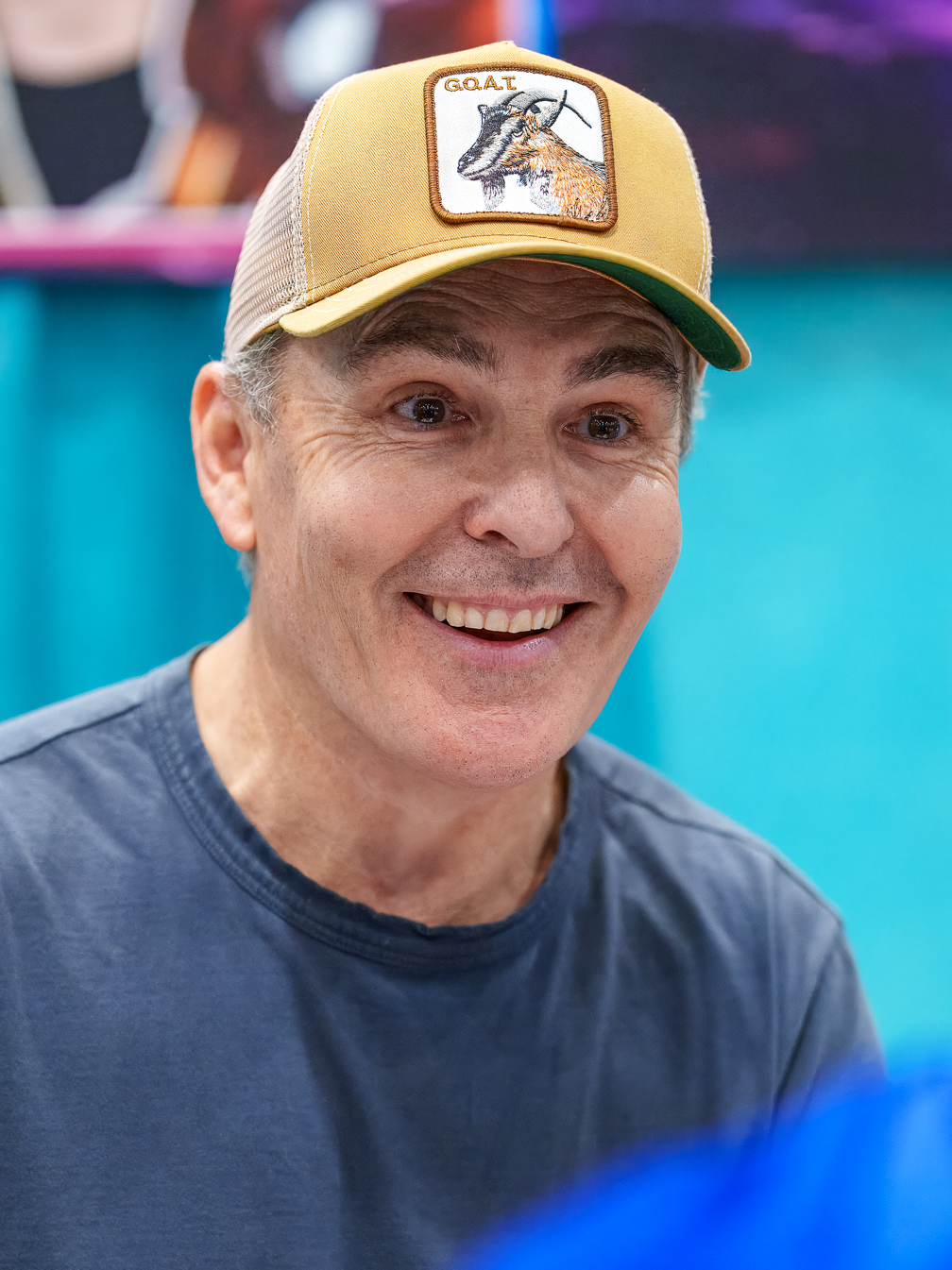
- North in 2025
- Born: October 31, 1970 (age 55); New Haven, Connecticut, U.S.
- Occupations: Actor, voice actor
- Years active: 1997–present
- Spouse: Jill Murray (m. 1999)
- Children: 2

Nolan North (born October 31, 1970) is an American actor best known for his voice acting roles.

After his breakthrough role as Dr. Chris Ramsey on the ABC soap opera Port Charles in 1997, North moved into voice acting when the show ended in 2003 and has since become best known for his video game roles as Nathan Drake in the Uncharted series, Desmond Miles in the Assassin's Creed series, Merasmus in Team Fortress 2, the Prince in Prince of Persia, Dr. Edward Richtofen in the Call of Duty franchise, Deadpool in various Marvel Comics media, the Penguin in the Batman: Arkham franchise, Captain Martin Walker in Spec Ops: The Line, David in The Last of Us, himself as one of the voices for the player character in Saints Row IV, Iron Man in Marvel's Avengers, and Ghost in the Destiny video game series.

In animation, North voices Smokescreen on Transformers: Prime, Superboy on Young Justice, and the titular character in Blaze and the Monster Machines.

== Early life ==
North was born on October 31, 1970, in New Haven, Connecticut, and raised in Warwick, Rhode Island, where he attended and played baseball at Bishop Hendricken High School. He majored in journalism with a baseball scholarship at the University of North Carolina at Chapel Hill, and spent the next year working as a reporter in New Jersey before moving to New York City to pursue a career in stand-up comedy and acting.

== Career ==
North eventually relocated to Los Angeles, where he was cast as Dr. Chris Ramsey in the General Hospital spin-off series Port Charles in 1997. He worked as a voice actor on a few video games during this time, and began to focus on this career path following the cancellation of Port Charles in 2003.

One of North's most notable voice roles came in 2007, when he voiced and performed motion capture for the protagonist Nathan Drake in the video game Uncharted: Drake's Fortune. Since then, he has continued to portray the character in Uncharted 2: Among Thieves (2009), Uncharted 3: Drake's Deception (2011), and Uncharted 4: A Thief's End (2016), as well as the PlayStation Vita exclusive Uncharted: Golden Abyss (2012). In an interview with The Guardian, he said his time as Drake requires "a lot of imagination" because "motion capture is basically theatre in spandex; there's minimal props, and you need a willingness to make an ass of yourself". For his role as Drake, North was twice nominated at the Spike Video Game Awards in the "Best Performance by a Human Male" category.

North's other notable video game voice roles include the Prince in Prince of Persia and Desmond Miles in the Assassin's Creed series. He also voiced Vossler in Final Fantasy XII, Eradan in Lord of the Rings: War in the North, the male Jedi Consular in Star Wars: The Old Republic and its following expansions, David in The Last of Us, Dr. Edward Richtofen in the ”Zombies” mode of the Call of Duty series, Brawl in Transformers: War for Cybertron, and Ghost Rider in Marvel: Ultimate Alliance, as well as Shadow Demon, Lycan, Lone Druid, Brewmaster, Gyrocopter, Ogre Magi, Meepo, Earth Spirit, Troll Warlord, and the Keeper of the Light in Dota 2. He voices various Team Fortress 2 characters such as the Engineer (partially), Merasmus, Redmond Mann, Blutarch Mann, Zepheniah Mann, and the Bombinomicon. He also replaced Peter Dinklage as the voice of the Ghost in Destiny: The Taken King, and additionally re-recorded all of Dinklage's lines from the base game Destiny. He continues to voice the character in subsequent releases. Following the release of Destiny 2: Forsaken, he portrayed not only Ghost but also took over the role of Cayde-6 from Nathan Fillion.

In the 2013 film Star Trek Into Darkness, North made one of his few increasingly rare live-action appearances since becoming a voice actor. Director J. J. Abrams had cited North's performance as Drake in the decision to cast him as a starship helmsman, as he and his son are fans of the Uncharted series. In a May 2012 interview, North said, "[Abrams is] a huge fan of gaming and he was telling me how people just don't understand [the medium] yet, but they're going to catch up. They don't understand how amazing this technology is and it doesn't get the respect it deserves, but if it keeps making the money it makes you're going to see more and more people converted. I mean, Gary Oldman, one of the greatest actors on the planet, did Call of Duty. He wouldn't have done it 10 years ago. It's a new age dawning, and I'm just really proud to be part of it."

North's animation roles include the voices of Cyclops in Wolverine and the X-Men, Snow Job in G.I. Joe: Renegades, Raphael in TMNT, both Superboy and Superman in Young Justice, and Smokescreen in Transformers: Prime. He has also voiced Blaze in Blaze and the Monster Machines since 2014. He was honored at a special event hosted by the British Academy of Film and Television Arts during the 2018 EA Expo, where he was given a special award for "outstanding contribution to performance in games".

In April 2018, North began hosting Retro Replay with fellow voice actor and frequent co-star Troy Baker. The show, which featured the two playing games in which they were involved while giving behind-the-scenes commentary on the making of the games, partnered with Rooster Teeth in April 2019. Baker left Retro Replay in April 2020, due to an apparent disagreement on the future direction of the series. The following month, North announced that the series was ending its partnership with Rooster Teeth. He had a brief cameo in the 2022 Uncharted film adaptation and also narrated the audiobook edition. In 2024, he appeared as Gene Campbell in the Peacock television series Hysteria!.

== Personal life ==
North married his Port Charles co-star Jill Murray on June 4, 1999. They have two children together.

== Accolades ==
Nolan North has received multiple awards and nominations for his work in the Uncharted series (2007–2016), as well as other video games including Deadpool (2013), The Last of Us (2013), Assassin's Creed II (2009) and the television shows Young Justice (2010–2022) and Transformers: Prime (2010–2013).

The Game Awards

Year	Nominated work	Category	Result
2016	Uncharted 4: A Thief's End	Best Performance	Won

British Academy Games Awards

Year	Nominated work	Category	Result
2012	Uncharted 3: Drake's Deception	Best Performer	Nominated
2013	Uncharted: Golden Abyss	Best Performer	Nominated
2017	Uncharted 4: A Thief's End	Best Performer	Nominated
2018	Nolan North	Special Award	Won

D.I.C.E. Awards

Year	Nominated work	Category	Result
2010	Uncharted 2: Among Thieves	Outstanding Achievement in Character Performance	Nominated
2012	Uncharted 3: Drake's Deception	Outstanding Achievement in Character Performance	Nominated
2017	Uncharted 4: A Thief's End	Outstanding Achievement in Character	Nominated

Spike Video Game Awards

Year	Nominated work	Category	Result
2009	Uncharted 2: Among Thieves	Best Voice	Nominated
2011	Uncharted 3: Drake's Deception	Best Performance by a Human Male	Nominated

Behind the Voice Actors Awards

Year	Nominated work	Category	Result
2012	Nolan North	Voice Actor of the Year	Nominated
2012	Nolan North	Voice Actor of the Year, People's Choice	Won
2012	Uncharted 3: Drake's Deception	Best Male Vocal Performance in a Video Game	Nominated
2013	Nolan North	Voice Actor of the Year	Nominated
2013	Young Justice	Best Male Lead Vocal Performance in a Television Series, Action/Drama	Nominated
2013	Transformers: Prime	Best Male Vocal Performance in a Television Series in a Supporting Role, Action/Drama	Nominated
2014	Nolan North	Voice Actor of the Year	Nominated
2014	Deadpool	Best Male Lead Vocal Performance in a Video Game	Nominated
2014	The Last of Us	Best Male Vocal Performance in a Video Game in a Supporting Role	Nominated
2014	The Last of Us	Best Male Vocal Performance in a Video Game in a Supporting Role, People's Choice	Won
2015	Nolan North	Voice Actor of the Year	Nominated
2017	Nolan North	Voice Actor of the Year	Nominated
2017	Uncharted 4: A Thief's End	Best Male Lead Vocal Performance in a Video Game	Won
