= Paul Walker (disambiguation) =

Paul Walker (1973−2013) was an American actor.

Paul Walker may also refer to:

- Paul A. Walker (FCC chairman) (1881–1965)
- Paul A. Walker (psychologist) (1946–1991), American social psychologist, founding president of World Professional Association of Transgender Health
- Paul Walker (American football) (1925–1972)
- Paul Walker (footballer, born 1949), English footballer
- Paul Walker (footballer, born 1960), English footballer
- Paul Walker (footballer, born 1977), Scottish footballer
- Paul Walker (footballer, born 1992), Welsh football goalkeeper
- Paul Walker (Arctic explorer) (born 1966), English explorer
- Paul Walker (Australian footballer) (born 1950)
- Paul Walker (judge) (born 1954), High Court judge
- Paul Walker (businessman) (born 1957), British businessman
- Paul Walker (pole vaulter) (born 1985), Welsh pole vaulter
- Paul Walker, former member of Mytown
- Paul Walker (album), a 2013 album by Drug Church

== See also ==
- Paul Baxendale-Walker, talk show host, lawyer, and author
- Paul's walk
