= Don Walker =

Don or Donald Walker may refer to:

- Don Walker (musician) (born 1951), Australian musician
- Don Walker (orchestrator) (1907–1989), American orchestrator
- Don Walker (diplomat), ambassador of New Zealand to Poland
- Don Walker (Australian footballer) (1873–1932), Australian rules footballer
- Don Walker (footballer, born 1935) (1935–2011), Scottish footballer
- Donald Walker (cricketer) (1912–1941), English cricketer
- Donald J. Walker, Canadian businessman
- Donald A. Walker (1934–2023), professor of economics
