= Roy Walker =

Roy Walker may refer to:

- Roy Walker (baseball) (1893–1962), American Major League Baseball pitcher
- Roy Walker (production designer) (1931–2013), British film production designer
- Roy Walker (comedian) (born 1940), television personality and comedian from Northern Ireland
- Roy Walker (footballer) (born 1957), football manager and former player from Northern Ireland
- "Roy Walker", a song by Belle & Sebastian from the album Dear Catastrophe Waitress

== See also ==
- Walker (surname)
