= Frederick Walker =

Frederick, Frederic, Friedrich or Fred Walker may refer to:

- Frederick Walker (native police commandant) (died 1866), explorer
- Frederick Walker (pathologist) (1934–2017) Scottish pathologist
- Frederick Walker (painter) (1840–1875), English painter and illustrator
- Frederic John Walker (1896–1944), British naval officer
- Frederic Walker (cricketer) (1829–1889), English cricketer
- Fred Walker (entrepreneur) (1884–1935), Australian businessman, original producer of Vegemite
- Mysterious Walker (Frederick Mitchell Walker, 1884–1958), American baseball pitcher and college baseball coach
- Dixie Walker (Fred E. Walker, 1910–1982), American professional baseball outfielder
- Fred Walker (footballer, born 1878) (1878–1940), English footballer for Leeds and Huddersfield
- Fred Walker (footballer, born 1913) (1913–1978), English footballer for Sheffield Wednesday
- Fred L. Walker (1887–1969), U.S. Army general in WW2, commander of the 36th Infantry Division
- Frederick James Walker (1876–1914), Irish motorcycle racer
- Frederick William Walker (1830–1910), English headmaster
- Freddy Walker (born 1994), New Zealand cricketer

== See also ==
- Frederick Forestier-Walker (1844–1910), British Army officer
