= Alexander Walker =

Alexander or Alex Walker may refer to:

== Sports ==
- Alexander Walker (cricketer) (1842–1903), Scottish cricketer
- Alex Walker (footballer, born 1881) (1881–1916), Scottish footballer
- Alex Walker (footballer, born 1984), Scottish footballer
- Alexander Walker (rugby union) (1908–1976), Scottish rugby union player
- Alex Walker (rugby union, born 1984), Australian rugby union player
- Alex Walker (rugby union, born 1986), Welsh rugby union player
- Alex Walker (rugby league) (born 1995), Scotland international rugby league footballer
- Alexander Walker (sport shooter), Scottish sport shooter - see Scotland at the 2018 Commonwealth Games
- Nickeil Alexander-Walker (born 1998), Canadian basketball player

== Other fields ==
- Alexander Walker (physiologist) (1779–1852), Scottish physiologist
- Alexander Walker (1837–1889), Scottish industrialist
- Alexander Walker II (1869–1950), Scottish businessman, son of the above
- Alexander Walker (critic) (1930–2003), British film critic and author
- Alexander Walker (conductor) (born 1973), British conductor
- Alexander Walker (MP) (fl. 1547), MP for Lichfield
- Alexander Stuart Walker (1826–1896), Justice of the Supreme Court of Texas
- Alex Walker, mayor of Central Hawke's Bay since 2016

== Fictional characters ==
- Alex Walker (The Dumping Ground character), on the British children's TV series The Dumping Ground
- Alex Walker, protagonist of the TV series Almost Paradise

== See also ==
- the third owner of the H. Alexander Walker Residence, Honolulu, Hawaii, on the US National Register of Historic Places
