= Ian Walker =

Ian Walker may refer to:

- Ian Walker (firefighter) (born 1945/1946), New Zealand volunteer firefighter.
- Ian Walker (footballer) (born 1971), English former footballer and goalkeeping coach
- Ian Walker (playwright) (born 1964), American playwright
- Ian Walker (politician) (born 1954), Member of Parliament in Queensland, Australia
- Ian Walker (sailor) (born 1970), British sailor
