= Simon Walker =

Simon Walker may refer to:

== People ==
- Simon Walker (basketball) (born 2006), American basketball player
- Simon Walker (businessman) (born 1953), Director General of the Institute of Directors
- Simon Walker (composer) (1961-2010), Australian composer
- Simon Walker (historian) (1958–2004), English medievalist
- Simon Walker (sailor) (born 1968), English yachtsman, adventurer and author
- Simon Walker (musician), member of alternative rock band Vega4

== Fictional characters ==
- Simon Walker (Hollyoaks), a character on the British soap opera Hollyoaks
