= Jeremy Walker =

Jeremy Walker may refer to:

- Jeremy Walker (baseball) (born 1995), American baseball player
- Jeremy Walker (soccer) (born 1993), Australian footballer
- Jeremy Kipp Walker, American filmmaker

== See also ==
- Jeremy Kemp (1935–2019), English actor with the surname "Walker"
