= Paul Walker (Australian footballer) =

Australian rules footballer

Personal information
- Full name: Paul Richard Walker
- Born: 3 November 1950 (age 76)
- Original team: Bundoora

Playing career^{1}
Years	Club	Games (Goals)
1968–1969	Collingwood	3 (0)
- ^{1} Playing statistics correct to the end of 1969.

Paul Richard Walker (born 3 November 1950) is a former Australian rules footballer who played the games for Collingwood in the Victorian Football League (VFL) in the late 1960s.

Walker played in the VFA with Preston and Coburg between 1971 and 1976.

Walker later played with Yarrawonga in the Ovens and Murray Football League and coached their Reserves side to a premiership in 1988.
