= Cheryl Lyn Walker =

American molecular biologist

- Born: Oak Cliff, Texas, US
- Spouse: Michael Walker

Academic background
- Education: BSc, molecular biology, 1977, University of Colorado Boulder; PhD, molecular biology, 1984, University of Texas Southwestern Medical Center; MD, Baylor College of Medicine
- Thesis: The Effects of epigenetic manipulations on cellular phenotype (1984)

Cheryl Lyn Walker is an American molecular biologist.

== Early life and education ==
Walker was born and raised in Oak Cliff of South Dallas, Texas. Her father was an entrepreneur who opened the first Spaghetti Warehouse restaurant. Upon graduating high school, she majored in molecular biology at the University of Colorado Boulder before earning her PhD in molecular biology at the University of Texas Southwestern Medical Center. She then enrolled at Baylor College of Medicine for her medical degree.

== Career ==
Upon completing her medical degree, Walker joined the faculty at the University of North Carolina at Chapel Hill, North Carolina State University, and the National Institute of Environmental Health Sciences. In 2009, she joined the faculty at the MD Anderson Cancer Center as the Ruth and Walter Sterling Professor of Carcinogenesis. While serving in this role, she was the co-recipient of a Grand Opportunity grant from the National Institute of Environmental Health Sciences for a two-year research program.

Walker left MD Anderson in 2011 to become the director of the Texas A&M University Health Science Center (TAMHSC) Institute of Biosciences and Technology (IBT), where she was expected to establish a program in translational cancer research. Following this, she was appointed to serve on the Board of Scientific Advisors of the National Cancer Institute and elected a Fellow of the American Association for the Advancement of Science. As the director, Walker brought the TAMHSC into the Gulf Coast Consortia for Quantitative Biomedical Sciences and established the Texas Screening Alliance for Cancer Therapeutics. She also founded a Field-to-Clinic initiative in disease prevention at the IBT and oversaw the development of two centers of research excellence. Due to her success, Walker was named a 2015 "Women on the Move" award recipient by Texas Executive Women.

Walker eventually left Texas A&M to become the director of the Center for Precision Environmental Health and a professor in the Departments of Molecular and Cellular Biology, Medicine, and Molecular and Human Genetics at Baylor College of Medicine. Upon joining the faculty, she was elected to the National Academy of Medicine. Following this, she was awarded an Outstanding Investigator Award from the National Cancer Institute for her project "A New Target for Chromatin Remodeler Defects in Cancer." In 2019, Walker was the recipient of the Roy O. Greep Award for Outstanding Research from the Endocrine Society.

=== Research ===
In 1998, Walker was among the first to show that tumor suppressor genes were the target for chemical carcinogens in the environment. Due to this discovery, she "created an animal model for the most frequent gynecologic tumor of women, elucidating pathways by which environmental exposures reprogram the epigenome and discovering a new linkage between the epigenome and the cytoskeleton." Walker also developed a groundbreaking animal model for uterine leiomyoma/fibroids.

== Personal life ==
Walker and her husband Michael have two children together.
