= Daphne Walker =

Daphne Walker may refer to:

- Daphne Walker (figure skater) (born c. 1924), British figure skater
- Daphne Walker (singer) (1930–2025), recording artist and singer from New Zealand
