= Don Walker (Australian footballer) =

Australian rules footballer

Personal information
- Full name: James Donald Walker
- Born: 11 July 1873; Maryborough, Victoria
- Died: 2 June 1932 (aged 58); Preston, Victoria
- Original team: Excelsior

Playing career^{1}
Years	Club	Games (Goals)
1898	St Kilda	1 (0)
- ^{1} Playing statistics correct to the end of 1898.

James Donald Walker (11 July 1873 – 2 June 1932) was an Australian rules footballer who played with St Kilda in the Victorian Football League (VFL).
