= Timothy Walker =

Timothy or Tim Walker may refer to:

- Tim Walker (born 1970), British fashion photographer
- Tim Walker (American football) (born 1958), American football player
- Tim Walker (politician) (1917–1986), Australian politician
- Timothy Walker (judge) (1802–1856), American lawyer
- Timothy Walker (civil servant) (born 1945), British civil servant
- Timothy Walker (botanist) (born 1958), British botanist
- Timothy Walker (actor) (born 1972), British television and film actor
