= Devon Walker =

Devon Walker may refer to:

- Devon Walker (American football) (born 1990), American college football player
- Devon Walker (comedian) (born 1991), American stand-up comedian, actor, and writer
- DeVon Walker (born 1985), American indoor football player
