= Mary Walker =

Mary Walker may refer to:

- Mary Rebecca Dowd, birth name of Mamie Dowd Walker (1880–1960), American jurist and civil leader
- Mary Adelaide Walker, English travel writer
- Mary Ann Walker (1845–1888), Whitechapel murder victim
- Mary Broadfoot Walker (1888–1974), British physician
- Mary Chase Walker (1828–1899), American schoolteacher, pioneer, and suffragette
- Mary Cozens-Walker (1938–2020), English textile artist and painter
- Mary Edwards Walker (1832–1919), American physician and Medal of Honor recipient
- Mary Hardway Walker (1848–1969), early civil rights activist and educator, resident of Chattanooga US
- Mary L. Walker (born 1948), American lawyer
- Mary Lily Walker (1863–1913), Scottish social reformer
- Mary Richardson Walker (1811–1877), American missionary
- Mary Shore Walker (1882–1952), American mathematician
- Mary Walker (rodeo) (born 1959), American former world champion barrel racer
- Mary Willis Walker (1942–2023), American crime fiction author
- Mary Russell Walker (1846–1938), Scottish teacher
- Mary Eliza Walker Crump (1857–1928), née Walker, African American contralto singer and manager

== Fictional characters ==
- Mary Walker, the alter-ego of the comic book character Typhoid Mary
- Mary Walker, in the American TV series Iron Fist

== See also ==
- Mary Walker Phillips (1923–2007), American artist, author, and educator
- Mary Walker-Sawka (born c. 1916), Canadian film producer
