= Graham Walker (footballer) =

Australian rules footballer (born 1935)

Personal information
- Full name: Graham Walker
- Born: 14 July 1935 (age 91)
- Height: 182 cm (6 ft 0 in)
- Weight: 86 kg (190 lb)

Playing career^{1}
Years	Club	Games (Goals)
1954	North Melbourne	1 (0)
- ^{1} Playing statistics correct to the end of 1954.

Graham Walker (born 14 July 1935) is a former Australian rules footballer who played with North Melbourne in the Victorian Football League (VFL).
