= Ashley Walker =

Ashley Walker may refer to:

- Ashley Walker (cricketer) (1844–1927), English cricketer
- Ashley Walker (astrochemist), American astrochemist, science communicator, and activist
- Ashley Walker (basketball) (born 1987), American-Romanian basketball player
