= Malcolm Walker =

Malcolm Walker may refer to:

- Malcolm Walker (American football) (1943–2022)
- Malcolm Walker (cartoonist)
- Malcolm Walker (cricketer) (1933–1986)
- Sir Malcolm Walker (businessman) (born 1946), co-founder of UK supermarket Iceland Foods Ltd
