= Keith Walker (cricketer) =

English cricketer

Personal information
- Full name: Keith Gordon Eldridge Walker
- Born: 30 November 1922; Wimbledon, Surrey, England
- Died: 7 November 1989 (aged 66); Goring-on-Thames, Oxfordshire, England
- Batting: Left-handed
- Bowling: Leg break

Career statistics
Competition	First-class
Matches	2
Runs scored	54
Batting average	18.00
100s/50s	–/–
Top score	26
Balls bowled	102
Wickets	0
Bowling average	–
5 wickets in innings	–
10 wickets in match	–
Best bowling	–
Catches/stumpings	–/–
- Source: Cricinfo, 19 June 2019

Keith Gordon Eldridge Walker (30 November 1922 – 7 November 1989) was an English first-class cricketer.

A banker by profession, Walker played two first-class cricket matches for D. R. Jardine's XI. Both appearances came against Oxford University at Eastbourne, the first coming in 1955 and the second 1957. He score 54 runs in his two matches, with a high score of 26, while with his leg break bowling he bowled 17 wicketless overs which conceded 82 runs. He died at Goring-on-Thames in November 1989.
