= Ray Walker =

Ray Walker may refer to:

- Ray Walker (artist) (1945–1984), British mural artist
- Ray Walker (actor) (1904–1980), American actor in The Adventures of Superboy
- Ray Walker (singer) (born 1934), member of the singing group The Jordanaires
- Ray Walker (Australian rules footballer) (born 1941), Australian rules footballer
- Ray Walker (footballer, born 1963), English footballer
