= Arnold Walker =

Arnold Walker may refer to:

- Arnold Walker (footballer) (1932–2017), English footballer
- Arnold Walker (RAF officer) (1917–2008), British pilot
- Arnold Walker (rugby league) (1952–2022), English rugby league footballer
- Death of Arnold Walker (2000–2019), or Kumanjayi Walker, shot while resisting arrest
