= Hamilton Walker =

Hamilton Walker may refer to:

- Hamilton Walker (inventor) (1903–1990), New Zealand inventor, engineer and farmer
- Hamilton Walker (politician) (1782–1830), Canadian lawyer, judge and political figure
