= Leslie Walker =

Leslie Walker may refer to:

- Leslie Walker (bishop), bishop of Mpumalanga, South Africa
- Leslie Walker (author), American author, journalist and college professor
