= Mel Walker =

Mel Walker may refer to:

- Mel Walker (high jumper) (1914–2000), American high jumper
- Mel Walker (musician) (1929–1964), American R&B singer
