= Jackie Walker =

Jackie Walker may refer to:

- Jackie Walker (American football, born 1962), American football linebacker
- Jackie Walker (American football, born 1950) (1950–2002), American football linebacker
- Jackie Walker (activist) (born 1954), British left-wing activist
- Jackie Walker (gymnastics), gymnastics coach at Louisiana State University, Stanford University and San Jose State University
- Jackie Walker (singer) (born 1939), American popular music tenor singer
