= Barbara Walker =

Barbara Walker may refer to:

- Barbara G. Walker (born 1930), American author and feminist
- Barbara Jo Walker (1926–2000), American beauty pageant contestant, Miss America in 1947
- Barbara Walker (artist) (born 1964), British artist
- Barbara K. Walker, writer of Teeny-Tiny and the Witch-Woman
- Barbara S. Walker (1935-2014), Outdoor advocate and namesake of the Barbara Walker Crossing in Portland, Oregon
