= Stephen Walker =

Stephen Walker or Steven Walker may refer to:

== People ==
- Stephen Walker (sculptor) (1927–2014), Australian artist
- Stephen Walker, Australian writer and photographer (born 1968)
- Steven C. Walker, American scholar of English literature, author of a book on Tolkien's prose style
- Stephen Todd Walker (born 1966), American finance expert and author
- Steve Walker (born 1973), Canadian ice hockey player
- Stephen Walker (footballer) (born 2000), English footballer
- Stephen Walker (filmmaker), British filmmaker and author
- Stephen James Walker, British writer and editor
- Stephen Walker, musician in Modern English
- Steven Walker, musician in Spitfire
- Stephen Walker, broadcaster 3RRR
- Steven Walker (politician), member of the Arkansas House of Representatives
- Stephen Walker (journalist) (1964/1965–2026), English-born Northern Irish journalist and author

== Characters ==
- Stephen Walker, a character on Criminal Minds
- Steve Walker, a character in In the Flesh
