= Ralph Walker =

Ralph Walker may refer to:

- Ralf Marc Walker (1872–1935), a.k.a. Ralph or R.M., owner of the Fifth Street Store and Walker Scott Department Stores in California
- Ralph C. S. Walker (born 1944), former head of the Humanities Division at Oxford and Kant specialist
- Ralph Thomas Walker (1889–1973), American architect and president of the American Institute of Architects
- Ralph Walker (engineer) (1749-1824), Scottish civil engineer associated with London Docks
- Ralph Walker (Neighbours), fictional character on the Australian soap opera Neighbours
