= Kenneth Walker =

Kenneth, Ken or Kenny Walker may refer to:

== Politics ==
- Kenneth Walker (Mississippi politician) (born 1953), member of the Mississippi House of Representatives
- Ken Walker (Oklahoma politician), member of the Oklahoma House of Representatives, 2012–2016

== Sports ==
=== Gridiron football ===
- Kenny Walker (American football) (born 1967), American football defensive lineman
- Kenneth Walker III (wide receiver) (born 1994), American football wide receiver
- Kenneth Walker III (born 2000), American football running back

=== Other sports ===
- Ken Walker (footballer) (1919–2013), Australian rules footballer
- Kenneth Walker (Australian cricketer) (born 1941), Australian cricketer
- Kenny Walker (basketball) (born 1964), American basketball player
- Kenneth Walker (English cricketer) (born 1970), English cricketer

== Other ==
- Kenneth Walker (author) (1882–1966), British author
- Kenneth Walker (general) (1898–1943), U.S. Army aviator and general
- Ken Walker (physician) (1924–2025), Canadian physician and author
- Kenneth Walker, boyfriend of Breonna Taylor, who was shot by police in Louisville, Kentucky, U.S.; see Killing of Breonna Taylor#Kenneth Walker
- Ken Walker, part of former vlogger couple DK4L

== See also ==
- Kenneth Walker Marshall (1911–1992), Scottish international rugby and cricket player
