= Gilbert Walker (cricketer) =

English cricketer

Personal information
- Full name: Gilbert Walker
- Born: 15 February 1888; Olton, Warwickshire, England
- Died: 8 May 1952 (aged 64); Werribee, Victoria, Australia
- Batting: Right-handed

Domestic team information
- Years: Team
- 1912: Warwickshire

Career statistics
Competition	First-class
Matches	1
Runs scored	13
Batting average	6.50
100s/50s	–/–
Top score	13
Balls bowled	–
Wickets	–
Bowling average	–
5 wickets in innings	–
10 wickets in match	–
Best bowling	–
Catches/stumpings	–/–
- Source: Cricinfo, 27 December 2011

Gilbert Walker (15 February 1888 – 8 May 1952) was an English cricketer. Walker was a right-handed batsman. He was born at Olton, Warwickshire.

Walker made a single first-class appearance for Warwickshire against Sussex at Edgbaston in the 1912 County Championship. Sussex made 151 in their first-innings and in response Warwickshire made 257 in their first-innings, with Walker being dismissed for a duck by Harry Simms. Sussex made 150 in their second-innings, leaving Warwickshire with a target of 45. Walker had batted at number eight in the first-innings, but was promoted to open the batting, scoring 13 runs before he was dismissed by Simms. Despite this, Warwickshire won the match by 6 wickets. This was his only major appearance for Warwickshire.

He died at Werribee, Victoria, Australia in 1952.
