= Ian Walker (firefighter) =

New Zealand firefighter

Ian Walker QSM
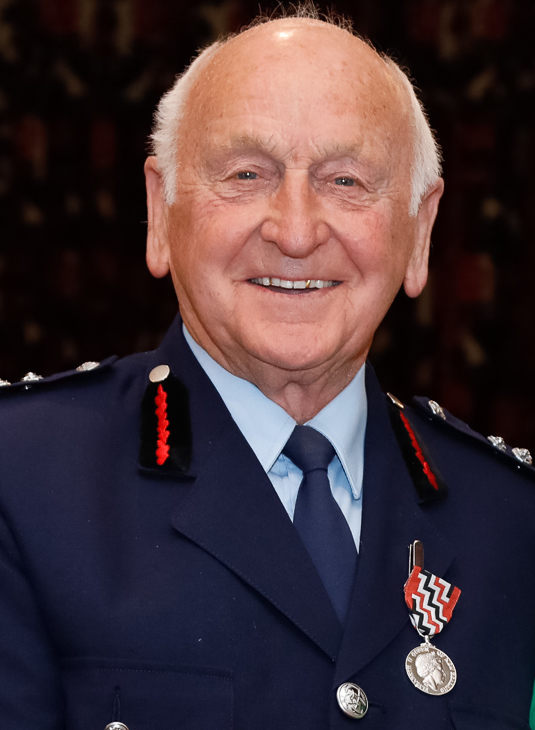
- Walker in 2020
- Born: Ian Norman Walker; 1945 or 1946 (age 79–80)
- Occupation: Mechanic
- Known for: Chief fire officer
- Spouse: Gwen Walker

Ian Norman Walker QSM (born 1945 or 1946) is a volunteer firefighter based in Kaikōura, a coastal town in the South Island of New Zealand.

== Career ==
Walker became a member of the Kaikōura volunteer fire brigade in 1979. He assumed the role of Chief Fire Officer in 1985, and was granted a Life Membership in 2002. Walker served as the Chief Fire Officer during major floods in the district in 1993, and during the 2016 Kaikōura earthquake. The work of the volunteer fire brigade in supporting the local community was celebrated in July 2016, when Walker and the entire volunteer fire brigade crew of 25 and their partners were acknowledged with a complimentary dinner at a local restaurant, The Pier Hotel.

Walker also runs an automotive business in Kaikōura.

Walker was a member of the Kaikōura District Council between 1986 and 1992.

== 2016 Kaikōura earthquake ==
In the immediate response to the Kaikōura earthquake of 14 November 2016, Walker took a lead role in co-ordinating between the local community and Fire and Emergency New Zealand, Urban Search and Rescue, the New Zealand Defence Force and other stakeholders.

The fire brigade mobilised immediately following the earthquake and assembled at the Fire Station, despite many volunteers suffering extensive damage to their own properties and businesses in the town. The doors of the Fire Station were damaged, trapping the fire engines inside until the doors could be removed. There was no power in the town and most phone networks were not operating.

One of the many notable actions of the Kaikōura volunteer fire brigade in the immediate aftermath of the earthquake was the rescue of a 100 year old woman from the ruins of the collapsed historic Elms Homestead. Despite the building being on low-lying ground, the threat of tsunami, and on-going after-shocks, the entire brigade worked through the night to free the woman and search for others in the collapsed building. Walker says about this experience:

We may be volunteers but as soon as you put a fire brigade uniform on, you have a job to do.

== Honours and awards ==
In the 2020 Queen's Birthday Honours, Walker was awarded the Queen's Service Medal, for services to Fire and Emergency New Zealand.

== Personal life ==
Walker is married to Gwen.
