= Marcus Walker =

Marcus Walker may refer to:

- Marcus Walker (basketball) (born 1986), American basketball player
- Marcus Walker (rugby league) (born 2002), English rugby league footballer
- Marcus Walker, a fictional character on the American television series Scandal
