= Alexander Walker (MP) =

Alexander Walker (fl. 1547), was an English Member of Parliament (MP).

He was a Member of the Parliament of England for Lichfield in 1547.
