= Colin Walker =

Colin Walker may refer to:

- Colin Walker (footballer, born 1929) (1929–2017), English former footballer
- Colin Walker (cellist) (born 1949), English cellist
- Colin Walker, lead drummer of Albannach
- Colin Walker (footballer, born 1958), English-born New Zealand former footballer and manager
- Colin Walker (runner) (born 1962), English steeplechaser
- Colin Walker (bowls) (born 1975), Scottish bowls international
