= Senator Walker =

Senator Walker may refer to:

== Members of the United States Senate ==
- Freeman Walker (1780–1827), U.S. Senator from Georgia from 1819 to 1821
- George Walker (Kentucky politician) (1763–1819), U.S. Senator from Kentucky from 1814 to 1815
- Isaac P. Walker (1815–1872), U.S. Senator from Wisconsin from 1848 to 1855
- James D. Walker (1830–1906), U.S. Senator from Arkansas from 1879 to 1885
- John Walker (Virginia politician) (1744–1809), U.S. Senator from Virginia in 1790
- John Williams Walker (1783–1823), U.S. Senator from Alabama from 1819 to 1822
- Robert J. Walker (1801–1869), U.S. Senator from Mississippi from 1835 to 1845
- Walter Walker (politician) (1883–1956), U.S. Senator from Colorado in 1932

== United States state senate members ==
- Amasa Walker (1799–1875), Massachusetts State Senate
- C. Harding Walker (1859–1934), Virginia State Senate
- Carlene M. Walker (born 1947), Utah State Senate
- Charles E. Walker (1860–1893), New York State Senate
- Charles Walker (Georgia politician) (born 1947), Georgia State Senate
- David S. Walker (1815–1891), Florida State Senate
- Edward C. Walker (New York politician) (1837–1903), New York State Senate
- Edward Walker (politician) (born 1969), Montana State Senate
- Greg Walker (politician) (born 1963), Indiana State Senate
- Howard Walker (politician) (born 1954), Michigan State Senate
- Jack E. Walker (1900–1979), Illinois State Senate
- Jimmy Walker (1881–1946), New York State Senate
- John A. Walker (Iowa politician) (1912–2012), Iowa State Senate
- John Walker (Missouri politician) (1770–1838), Missouri State Senate
- Joseph Knox Walker (died 1863), Tennessee State Senate
- Kyle Walker (politician), Indiana State Senate
- Larry Walker III (born 1965), Georgia State Senate
- Lyman Walker (1799–1886), Wisconsin State Senate
- Mark L. Walker (born 1947/1948), Illinois State Senate
- Moses B. Walker (1819–1895), Ohio State Senate
- Norman R. Walker (1889–1949), Alaska Territorial Senate
- Overture Walker, South Carolina State Senate
- Samuel Walker (soldier) (1822–1893), Kansas State Senate
- Sherry Walker (born 1960), Florida State Senate
- Stanley C. Walker (1923–2001), Virginia State Senate
- Vicki Walker (born 1956), Oregon State Senate
- William H. Walker (Vermont judge) (1832–1896), Vermont State Senate
