= Gary Walker =

Gary Walker may refer to:

- Gary Walker (American football center) (born 1963), former American football center
- Gary Walker (defensive end) (born 1973), former American football defensive end
- Gary Walker (defensive back) (born 1991), American football free safety
- Gary Walker (musician) (1942–2026), American-born drummer and vocalist
- Gary Alan Walker (1953–2000), American serial killer

== See also ==
- Garry Walker (born 1974), Scottish conductor
