= Mabel Walker =

Mabel Walker may refer to:

- Mabel Walker (athlete) (1928–2023), American sprinter
- Mabel Walker (suffragist) (1902–1987), American-Bahamian suffragist
- Mabel Walker Willebrandt (1889–1963), née Walker, American politician
