= Bruce Walker =

Bruce Walker may refer to:

- Bruce Walker (American football) (born 1972), American football player
- Bruce Walker (Canadian football) (born 1955), wide receiver in the Canadian Football League
- Bruce Walker (footballer) (born 1946), English footballer
- (Robert) Bruce Walker (politician, born 1870) (1870–1932), New South Wales politician
- (Ronald) Bruce Walker (politician, born 1897) (1897–1981), his son, New South Wales politician
- Bruce Walker (rugby league) (born 1952), Australian rugby league footballer
- Bruce D. Walker (born 1952), American physician
- Bruce J. Walker, American engineer, lawyer and government official
