= Justin Walker =

Justin Walker may refer to:

- Justin Walker (actor), American actor
- Justin Walker (footballer) (born 1975), English former professional footballer
- Justin Walker (Brothers & Sisters), a character from Brothers & Sisters
- Justin R. Walker (born 1982), United States federal judge on Court of Appeals for the District of Columbia Circuit
