= Mitch Walker =

Mitch Walker may refer to:

- Mitchell L. Walker, an American activist and psychologist.
- Mitch Walker (footballer) (born 1991), an English professional footballer.
