= Benjamin Walker =

Benjamin Walker may refer to:

- Benjamin Walker (actor) (born 1982), American actor, star of Abraham Lincoln: Vampire Hunter
- Benjamin Walker (author) (1913–2013), English author on religion and philosophy, and an authority on esoterica
- Benjamin Walker (Continental Army officer) (1753–1818), Continental Army officer and United States Representative from New York
- Ben Walker (born 1976), Australian rugby league player
- National Party Chairman of the UK Independence Party (UKIP)
