= Stanley Walker =

Stanley or Stan Walker may refer to:

- Stanley Walker (cricketer) (1908–1993), English cricketer
- Stanley Walker (editor) (1898–1962), editor of the New York Herald Tribune
- Stanley T. Walker (1922–2013), American non-commissioned officer and Olympic biathlete
- Stanley C. Walker (1923–2001), Democratic member of the Virginia Senate
- Stanley Walker (murder victim)
- Stan Walker (born 1990), Australian born New Zealand singer and actor, winner of Australian Idol
- Stan Walker (Will & Grace), fictional character
