= Helen M. Walker =

American statistician

- Born: Helen Mary Walker; December 1, 1891; Keosauqua, Iowa, U.S.
- Died: January 15, 1983 (aged 91); Teaneck, New Jersey, U.S.
- Education: Ph.B, LL.D. Iowa Wesleyan College (1912); M.A., Ph.D.Columbia University (1929)
- Occupations: Statistician; Educator
- Known for: Educational statistics

Helen Mary Walker (December 1, 1891 – January 15, 1983) was a statistician and prominent educational researcher, and the first female president of the American Statistical Association when she was elected in 1944. From 1949 to 1950, she was also president of the American Educational Research Association and served on the Young Women's Christian Association from 1936 to 1950.

She taught at many universities throughout the US and in Japan, Chile, and Mexico. At Columbia University Teachers College, her alma mater, she was a lecturer in statistics beginning in 1925. She rose through professional ranks, and eventually served as Full Professor of Education from 1940 to 1957. Walker was awarded the title of Professor Emerita on her retirement in 1957.

In her honor, Columbia offered the "Helen M. Walker Scholarship Fund in Statistics" in 2012 to students who were pursuing graduate studies and planning to teach statistics.

== Biography ==
She graduated from Iowa Wesleyan College in 1912 with a Bachelor of Philosophy and then taught high school mathematics for nine years. After she earned a master's degree from Columbia University Teachers College, she taught at the University of Kansas as an assistant and then associate professor of mathematics and at the University of London. She earned her PhD from Columbia in 1929 with a dissertation titled Studies in the History of Statistical Method. For this thesis, she contacted Karl Pearson directly to ask his opinion on how he would like to be represented.

She earned a law degree in 1942 from Iowa Wesleyan College. She retired from Columbia University in 1957. She continued teaching after her retirement: as a Fulbright lecturer in Chile in 1958 and a lecturer at Tokyo University and the International Christian University from 1958 to 1959. She was a consultant for the Agency for the International Development of India in 1961. After moving to Claremont, California, she briefly taught classes at Pitzer College and Claremont Graduate School. She retired from teaching completely in 1970. A resident of Teaneck, New Jersey, she died there at the age of 91 at Holy Name Hospital and was survived by a daughter named Regina Lauring.

== Publications ==
=== Dissertation ===
- Studies in the history of statistical method: with special reference to certain educational problems (1929)

=== Books ===
- Mathematics essential for elementary statistics: a self-teaching manual (with W. N. Dorost, 1934)
- Algebra: A Way of Thinking (1936)
- Statistical Tables: Their Structure and Use (1936)
- Statistical Inference (with J. Len, 1953)

Walker, Helen M (1936). "An Unpublished Hydraulic Experiment of Roberval, 1668". Osiris. 1: 726. doi:10.1086/368451.
