= Lynne Walker =

Lynne Walker may refer to:

- Lynne Walker (critic) (1956–2011), Scottish-born music and theatre critic
- Lynne Walker (politician) (born 1962), Australian politician in the Northern Territory
