= Cyril Walker =

Cyril Walker may refer to:

- Cyril Walker (footballer) (1914–2002), English footballer
- Cyril Walker (golfer) (1892–1946), English golfer
- Cyril Walker (paleontologist) (1939–2006), British paleontologist
