= Kurt Walker =

Kurt Walker may refer to:

- Kurt Walker (ice hockey) (1954–2018), American professional ice hockey player
- Kurt Walker (boxer) (born 1995), Irish boxer
- Kurt Walker, character in the film Life as a House
