= Dennis Walker (banker) =

American banker (1943–1987)

- Walker in 1985
- Born: Dennis Lyle Walker; December 26, 1943; Ogden, Utah, U.S.
- Died: July 5, 1987 (aged 43); Las Vegas, Nevada, U.S.
- Education: University of Nevada, Reno; Washington State University
- Spouse: Sharon
- Children: 5

Dennis Lyle Walker (December 26, 1943 – July 5, 1987) was an American banker who used investments made to his bank, the International Bank of the South Pacific, to acquire millions of dollars' worth of sports memorabilia and rare gems. His large collection included items directly purchased from Pete Rose.

Born in Ogden, Utah, Walker was educated at the University of Nevada, Reno and Washington State University. He worked as a professor at Southern Oregon State College and was a lay bishop for The Church of Jesus Christ of Latter-day Saints. Walker established the International Bank of the South Pacific with a charter in Tonga. He received investments after promising returns of 25–30%. The National Sports Hall of Fame was opened by Walker in February 1985 and featured 250 World Series and Super Bowl rings among its collection. He fled from Oregon after charges were filed by the Oregon Attorney General in 1986 and was discovered dead the next year. $7 million worth of memorabilia was left unaccounted for at the time of his death.

== Early life ==
Dennis Lyle Walker was born on December 26, 1943, in Ogden, Utah. He graduated from Reno High School in 1961, the University of Nevada, Reno with bachelor's and master's degrees, and Washington State University with a doctorate.

In 1972, Walker was made a lay bishop for The Church of Jesus Christ of Latter-day Saints in the second ward of Ashland, Oregon. He was a member of the school board of the Phoenix-Talent School District and a political science professor at Southern Oregon State College from 1971 to 1981. He married Sharon, with whom he had five children.

== Collection ==
Walker opened the International Bank of the South Pacific with a charter in Tonga and managed it with four other people. Members of his LDS congregation invested into his bank. Investors were promised returns of 25–30%; According to an investigation by the Oregon government, Walker used the bank's money to buy sports memorabilia and rare gems, including a 6,100-carat blue topaz worth $300,000.

In 1985, Walker acquired Babe Ruth's uniform. Walker held $350,000 worth of Pete Rose memorabilia and directly bought items from Rose, including Rose's Hickok Belt, a $30,000 diamond-studded ring given to him for his 4,000th hit, the baseball bat that he broke the all-time hits record with, and two championship rings. The Federal Bureau of Investigation estimated that his collection was worth $5–7 million.

In February 1985, Rose was the master of ceremonies for the opening of Walker's National Sports Hall of Fame, which claimed to have around $20 million (about $58 million in 2024) worth of memorabilia. The collection included Lou Gehrig's ring for the 1936 World Series, Willie Mays' ring for the 1954 World Series, Jim Brown's NFL championship ring, a bronze medal from the 1896 Summer Olympics, Jim Craig's gold medal from the 1980 Winter Olympics, and a total of 250 World Series and Super Bowl rings.

== Death ==
The Oregon Attorney General's office filed racketeering charges against Walker on February 6, 1986, claiming that he sold around $2.3 million (about $7 million in 2024) in unregistered certificates of deposit to investors in California, Oregon, Utah, and Washington from November 1984 to July 1985. This figure was later raised to $6–7 million. The state claimed as part of its fraud case against Walker that these funds were being used for his personal benefit.

Walker disappeared and was not noticed to be missing until his attorneys told the court that they could not find him on October 27, 1986. Walker signed into a Las Vegas motel under the name Charles Lee using a non-existent address in Phoenix, Arizona, and was found dead on July 5, 1987. His identity was verified three weeks later by dental records. His death was alleged to have been done by the American Mafia. His funeral was held in Logandale, Nevada, on July 11.

$7 million (about $19 million in 2024) of sports memorabilia held by Walker was not accounted for by the time of his death. Unsolved Mysteries covered Walker's case in a September 1988 episode. A collector named Sonny Jackson gave Ruth's uniform to the Suffolk County, New York, after the episode aired. Walker had $70,000 in unpaid debts to Rose.

== Works ==
- Walker, Dennis Lyle (1971). A Comparative Analysis of the Factors Influencing Party Voting Cohesion in Democratic Legislatures (PhD thesis). Washington State University. OCLC 8801536.

== Works cited ==
- "Authorities say investors bilked of $6 million to $7 million". The Oregonian. July 10, 1987. p. 15 – via Newspapers.com.
- "Body thought to be that of fugitive". The Bulletin. July 8, 1987. p. A7 – via Newspapers.com.
- "Collector". The Tennessean. April 2, 1989. p. 14C – via Newspapers.com.
- "Dennis L. Walker". Reno Gazette-Journal. July 29, 1987. p. 2C – via Newspapers.com.
- "Investors criticize slow pace of investigation". The Oregonian. November 16, 1986. p. D3 – via Newspapers.com.
- "Medford facility offers collection of memorabilia". The Oregonian. February 19, 1986. p. D12 – via Newspapers.com.
- "Mementos". The Plain Dealer. April 19, 1989. p. 14A – via Newspapers.com.
- "New Bishoprics". Deseret News. May 20, 1972. p. Church-15 – via Newspapers.com.
- "Organizers of offshore banks list varied professional backgrounds". The Oregonian. November 16, 1986. p. D4 – via Newspapers.com.
- "Reno High School To Graduate 453". Nevada State Journal. June 8, 1961. p. 10 – via Newspapers.com.
- "Rose". The Cincinnati Enquirer. March 25, 1989. p. A8 – via Newspapers.com.
- "Rose". Dayton Daily News. May 22, 1989. p. 5A – via Newspapers.com.
- "State files suit for $6 million". The Oregonian. February 7, 1986. p. C4 – via Newspapers.com.
- "Show features Oregon cases". The Oregonian. August 24, 1988. p. D10 – via Newspapers.com.
- "The curse that Ruth built". Tampa Bay Times. May 26, 1995. Archived from the original on March 31, 2025.
- "The disappearance". The Oregonian. October 30, 1986. p. D11 – via Newspapers.com.
- "Walker assets still missing a week after body found". Albany Democrat-Herald. July 11, 1987. p. 5 – via Newspapers.com.
- Archdeacon, Tom (March 22, 1989). "Rose". Dayton Daily News. p. 5A – via Newspapers.com.
- Jackson, Steven (April 2, 1989). "Mystery dead man unfolds in Rose case". Courier News. p. C5 – via Newspapers.com.
- Van Gelder, Lawrence (May 25, 1995). "A Missing Uniform Wrapped in a Mystery". The New York Times. Archived from the original on February 16, 2018.
