= Clarence Walker =

Clarence Walker may refer to:

== Sports ==
- Clarence Walker (boxer) (1898–1957), South African boxer
- Clarence J. Walker (1928–1989), American college basketball player
- Foots Walker (Clarence Walker, born 1951), American basketball player

== Others ==
- Clarence Tex Walker (1946–2007), American musician
- Clarence R. Walker (1892–1959), member of the California legislature
- Clarence E. Walker (born 1941), professor of history at UC Davis
