= Isaac Walker =

Isaac Walker is the name of:

- Isaac Walker (cricketer) (1844–1898), English cricketer
- Isaac P. Walker (1815–1872), U.S. Senator from Wisconsin
- Isaac Walker (merchant) (1725–1804), British merchant
- Isaac Newton Walker (1803–1899), pioneer farmer and merchant in Illinois
