= Derek Walker (footballer) =

Scottish footballer

Personal information
- Full name: Derek John Walker
- Date of birth: 3 July 1966 (age 60)
- Place of birth: Glasgow, Scotland
- Positions: Midfielder; forward

Youth career
- Aberdeen Boys Club

Senior career*
Years	Team	Apps	(Gls)
1983–1986	Queen's Park	91	(15)
1986–1987	Hamilton Academical	11	(0)
1987–1988	Clyde	39	(16)
1988	Meadowbank Thistle	11	(0)
1988–1989	Kilmarnock	30	(1)
1989–1990	Stirling Albion	18	(4)
1990–1993	East Stirlingshire	70	(16)
1993–1994	Stranraer	2	(0)
1994	Albion Rovers	11	(2)
- * Club domestic league appearances and goals

Derek John Walker (born 3 July 1966) is a Scottish retired football midfielder who made over 280 appearances in the Scottish League, most notably for Queen's Park and East Stirlingshire.
