= Norman Walker =

Norman Walker may refer to:

- Norman Walker (bass) (1907–1963), English bass opera singer
- Norman W. Walker (1886–1985), British-American raw food and alternative health advocate
- Norman Walker (director) (1892–1963), British film director
- Norman Walker (footballer) (1935–2009), Australian rules footballer
- Norman R. Walker (1889–1949), Canadian-born American pharmacist and politician in Alaska
- Norman Snowy Walker (1901–1977), South African lawn bowler
- Sir Norman Purvis Walker (1862–1942), Scottish physician

== See also ==
- Norman Walker Porteous, theologian
- Hugh Norman-Walker (1916–1985), officer in the British Colonial Office
