= Lorna Walker =

British historian

Lorna Walker MBE
- Other name: Lorna Esme Margery Walker

Academic background
- Education: University of St Andrews

Academic work
- Discipline: History

Lorna Esmé Margery Walker MBE was a British historian and an Honorary Senior Mediaeval History Lecturer at the University of St Andrews. She had retired in 1991, and lived in St Andrews until her death in 2023.

== Early life ==
Walker was born in London, but lived in Cape Town, South Africa, from 1940 until 1943. There she attended the Micklefield School. Walker later attended the Wimbledon High School for Girls in London.

== Education ==
In 1948 Walker began an Undergraduate degree in History and French at the University of St Andrews. During her studies she stayed in University Hall. Throughout her studies Walker received multiple prizes for her achievements, including the Miller and Low prizes. In her final year she was a research assistant to Robin Adam in researching the historic papers of Dunrobin Castle.

After graduating from St Andrews, Walker won a Carnegie Scholarship in Medieval History and began studying for a master's degree at London University (Institute of Historical Research in London). Her research focused on the relationship between local and central courts in England in twelfth and thirteenth centuries. She was supervised by John Goronwy Edwards and Theodore Plucknett. Walker graduated MA with distinction.

== Academic career ==
After graduating, Walker took up a post at University College London in 1958 as the research assistant at the Goldsmiths’ Livery Company. She later applied for the joint position of lecturer in Medieval History and Warden of University Hall at the University of St Andrews. Walker started teaching at the university in 1961.

In 1976 Walker was made a Freeman, and in 1986 a Liveryman of the Worshipful Company of Goldsmiths.

Since her election in March 1985, Walker has been a Fellow of the Society of Antiquaries of London. She was also a member of the Selden Society and of the London Record Society.

Walker retired from her position as University Hall Warden in 1991. She continued teaching Medieval History for three more years, retiring in 1994. Walker still lives in St Andrews.

Walker was an Honorary Senior Lecturer in the University of St Andrews Department of Mediaeval History. In 2013 she was awarded the St Andrews University Medal in recognition of “her exceptional and dedicated contribution to the University over most of her lifetime”.

Walker was appointed Member of the Order of the British Empire (MBE) in the 2023 New Year Honours for services to higher education.

== Publications ==
Walker has contributed to the book The North Sea World: Studies in the Cultural History of North-Western Europe in the Middle Ages. In 1975 Walker contributed to Early History of the Goldsmiths' Company, 1327-1509: Including the Book of Ordinances, 1478-88, a volume on the history of the Goldsmiths’ Company.

Walker's publications include titles At the Feet of St Stephen Muret: Henry II and the Order of Grandmont redivivus; Fighting Knights and Sirens: Monreale and the Art of the Cloister; and Culture and Contacts in the Scottish Romanesque. She has also published articles in English and in French on the Order of Savigny, its records and its holy men.
