= Caroline Walker =

Caroline Walker may refer to:

- Caroline Walker (athlete) (born 1953), American long-distance runner
- Caroline Walker (food campaigner) (1950–1988), British nutritionist, writer, author and campaigner
- Caroline Walker (artist) (born 1982), Scottish artist
- Caroline Holme Walker (1863–1955), American composer, pianist, and teacher

== See also ==
- Carolyn Walker-Diallo, American judge
