= Clive Walker =

Clive Walker may refer to:

- Clive Walker (footballer, born 1945), English football defender (Leicester, Northampton, Mansfield)
- Clive Walker (footballer, born 1957), English football midfielder (Chelsea, Sunderland, QPR, Fulham, Brighton)
- Clive Walker (legal scholar), British legal scholar
