= Craig Walker =

Craig Walker may refer to:

- Craig Walker (writer) (born 1960), Canadian writer, theatre director, actor and educator
- Craig F. Walker, American photojournalist
- Craig Walker (musician) (born 1971), Irish singer
