= A Long, Dark Shadow =

2021 book by Allyn Walker

A Long, Dark Shadow: Minor-Attracted People and Their Pursuit of Dignity
- Author: Allyn Walker
- Language: English
- Publisher: University of California Press
- Publication date: June 2021
- Pages: 236 pages
- ISBN: 978-0-520-30634-9

A Long, Dark Shadow: Minor-Attracted People and Their Pursuit of Dignity is a book by Allyn Walker, then Assistant Professor of Sociology and Criminal Justice at Old Dominion University. The book’s first edition was published by the University of California Press in June 2021 as Walker's doctoral research. In the book, Walker conducted interviews with a total of 42 pedophiles who claimed to have never physically acted upon their sexual urges toward minors. However, some did admit to consuming child sexual abuse material (CSAM). These participants were sourced from the online forums B4U-ACT and Virtuous Pedophiles. Walker's primary emphasis lies in policy development and distinguishing between individuals with pedophilic tendencies who have not engaged in harmful behaviors as opposed to those classified as sex offenders.

The book generated considerable controversy in the United States in late 2021 as critics accused Walker of promoting pedophilia or child sexual abuse, contending that it undermines school safety. In light of the controversy, Walker made the decision to resign from Old Dominion University in November 2021 and subsequently became a postdoctoral scholar at Johns Hopkins University in 2022, and professor at SMU in 2024.

== Background ==
In 2010, Allyn Walker completed their masters studies at the Department of Social Work at Columbia University. After graduation, they worked as a social worker, supporting individuals who had experienced sexual assault. During this period, due to the nature of their work, they held the assumption that all individuals with pedophilic tendencies were engaging in criminal behavior. However, their perspective changed a year later when they became aware that some pedophiles were committed to not acting upon their sexual urges. This newfound knowledge piqued their interest in studying this particular demographic, leading them to engage with offline gatherings of an online support group for pedophiles.

Motivated by their curiosity, Walker recruited 42 individuals from the support group, conducting interviews to gather insights and compile material for the book. Through these interviews, Walker delved into topics including how pedophiles themselves define their sexual preferences, the reasons behind their decision not to harm children in reality, the strategies they employ to ensure non-offending behavior, and the negative treatment they face due to their preferences in society. In an interview with the Prostasia Foundation, a non-profit organization claiming to advocate for civil rights and the prevention of child sexual abuse, Walker noted that because they are queer, they empathized with the social exclusion experienced by pedophiles.

In their book, Walker adopts the term "minor-attracted persons" to align with the terminology used by support groups, aiming to dissociate it from direct associations with sex crimes. Furthermore, they emphasize that pedophilia represents an uncontrollable sexual preference, implying that moral judgments of right or wrong are not applicable to the preference itself. However, Walker acknowledges that there exists a distinction between right and wrong in terms of behavior and actions.

Recognizing the potential for misinterpretation and concern about the book's message even before its publication, Walker drafted a memo to their colleagues in May 2021. In this memo, they made it explicitly clear that they do not support any form of child sexual abuse. Department chair Mona J.E. Danner reviewed the memo; along with book summaries, it was then shared with Jonathan Leib, the interim dean of the Faculty of Arts and Letters, and subsequently reached university leadership. At the time, Leib believed that the book's primary audience would consist mainly of individuals who are not part of the general public, thus anticipating limited external reactions and publicity.
