= Kim Walker =

Kim Walker or Kimberly Walker may refer to:

- Kim Walker (actress) (1968–2001), American actress
- Kim Walker (bassoonist) (active 2000–present), Scottish-American musician
- Kim Walker (dancer), former dancer, CEO of NAISDA Dance College, Australia, since 2007/8
- Kim Walker (field hockey) (born 1975), Australian field hockey player
- Kim Walker-Smith (born 1981), American singer, songwriter, Christian worship leader
- Kimberly Walker (soldier) (died 2013), American soldier and murder victim
- Paigion, stage name of Kimberly Paigion Walker (born 1986), American television personality and actress
- Kim Walker (sprinter) (born 1968), American sprinter, 1991 NCAA 4 × 400 m winner for the Nebraska Cornhuskers track and field team
