= Sarah Walker =

Sarah Walker may refer to:

- Sarah Walker (author) (born 1965), Australian author
- Sarah Walker (badminton) (born 1989), English badminton player
- Sarah Walker (Brothers & Sisters), a character in the television series Brothers & Sisters
- Sarah Walker (BMX rider) (born 1988), BMX bike racer from New Zealand
- Sarah Walker (Chuck), a character on the American television show Chuck
- Sarah Walker (mezzo-soprano) (born 1943), British mezzo-soprano singer
- Sarah Walker (activist), English political activist and spokesperson for the English Collective of Prostitutes
- Sarah Woodruff Walker (1814–1879), wife of Supreme Court justice David Davis
- Madam C. J. Walker (Sarah Breedlove, 1867–1919), American businesswoman

== See also ==
- Sara Imari Walker, American theoretical physicist and astrobiologist
