= Alice Walker (disambiguation) =

Alice Walker (born 1944) is an American novelist, poet, and social activist.

Alice Walker may also refer to:

- Alice Walker (fencer) (1876–1954), British Olympian
- Alice Walker (scholar) (1900–1982), British literary scholar
- Alice Leslie Walker (1885–1954), American archeologist

== See also ==
- Alice Walker: Beauty in Truth, a documentary film about the novelist
