= Jane Walker =

Jane Walker may refer to:

- Jane Brotherton Walker (1925–2009), Kenyan-South African expert in the field of tick taxonomy
- Jane Harriett Walker (1859–1938), English medical doctor
- Jane Walker Burleson, née Walker (1888–1957), American socialite, artist, and Texan suffragette
- Jane Walker (charity founder) (born c. 1964), British charity worker who founded the Philippine Community Fund
