= Adam Walker =

Adam Walker may refer to:

- Adam Walker (American football, born 1963), American football running back
- Adam Walker (American football, born 1968), American football running back
- Adam Walker (Australian politician) (1829–1902), Australian politician
- Adam Walker (British politician) (born 1969), leader of the British National Party
- Adam Walker (Canadian politician), provincial politician from British Columbia
- Adam Walker (flautist) (born 1987), English classical flautist
- Adam Walker (footballer) (born 1991), English footballer
- Adam Walker (ice hockey) (born 1986), Scottish ice hockey player
- Adam Walker (inventor) (1730–1821), English writer and inventor
- Adam Walker (rugby league) (1991–2022), Scotland international rugby league footballer
- Adam Walker (baseball) (born 1991), American baseball outfielder
