= C. J. Walker =

C. J. Walker, or CJ Walker may refer to:

- Madam C. J. Walker (1867–1919), African–American entrepreneur and activist
- C. J. Walker (basketball), (born 2001), American basketball player
- CJ Walker (basketball) (born 1997), American basketball player

== See also ==
- Self Made (miniseries), a TV show about Madam C. J. Walker
- Madame C.J. Walker Home for Girls and Women, San Francisco, California
