= Tanya Walker =

Tanya Walker may refer to:

- Tanya Walker (Canadian lawyer)
- Tanya Walker, character from Knight Rider played by Phyllis Davis
