= Russ Walker =

Russ Walker may refer to:

- Russ Walker (rugby league) (born 1962), English former professional rugby league player
- Russ Walker (ice hockey) (born 1953), Canadian former WHA- and NHL player

== See also ==
- Russell Walker (1842–1922), English cricketer, barrister, and cricket administrator
- Russell Walker Houston, American politician
