= Hugh Walker =

Hugh Walker may refer to:

- Hugh Walker (academic) (1855–1939), British university educator
- Hugh Walker (field hockey) (1888–1958), Scottish Olympic field hockey player
