= Joe Walker (Zydeco) =

- Born: Joseph Walker; 1944 (age 81–82); Lafayette, Louisiana, United States
- Genres: Zydeco
- Instruments: Accordion, singer

Joe Walker (born 1944) is an American Zydeco singer and accordionist.

== Biography ==
Walker began his career in the wake of Clifton Chenier, and became the star of Zydeco of the late 20th century, thanks to albums such as Zydeco Fever and In the Dog House, edited by Zane Records.

== Style ==
Walker has a powerful voice with a rich texture. His style is heavily influenced by gospel music.
