= Joseph Walker =

Joseph or Joe Walker may refer to:

== People ==
=== Musicians ===
- Joe Louis Walker (1949–2025), American blues musician from San Francisco
- Joe Walker (Zydeco) (born 1944), American Zydeco singer and accordionist from Lafayette, Louisiana

=== Politicians ===
- Joseph H. Walker (1829–1907), US Representative from Massachusetts, 1893–1899
- Joseph Walker (Massachusetts speaker) (1865–1941), his son, Speaker of the Massachusetts House of Representatives
- Joseph Marshall Walker (1784–1856), Governor of Louisiana, 1850s
- Joseph Knox Walker (1818–1863), American politician and officer in the Confederate Army

=== Athletes ===
- Joseph W. Walker (1952–2023), karate practitioner and instructor
- Joe Walker (cricketer) (born 1992), New Zealand cricketer
- Joseph Walker (swimmer), Australian swimmer with an intellectual disability
- Joe Walker (linebacker) (born 1993), American football linebacker
- Joe Walker (defensive back) (born 1977), American football defensive back
- Joe Walker (wide receiver), American football wide receiver, see 2019 Chicago Bears season

=== In arts and entertainment ===
- Joseph A. Walker (playwright) (1935–2003), American playwright
- Joseph Walker (cinematographer) (1892–1985), Hollywood director of photography during the 1930s and 1940s
- Joe Walker (novelist) (1910–1971), Australian novelist and union organiser
- Joe Walker (film editor) (born 1963), British film editor

=== Other ===
- Joseph A. Walker (1921–1966), American astronaut
- Joseph Cooper Walker (1762–1810), Irish antiquary and writer
- Joseph Edison Walker (1879–1958), former president of the Universal Life Insurance Company
- Joseph R. Walker (1798–1876), early explorer of the American West who established the segment of the California Trail, from Fort Hall, Idaho, to the Truckee River
- Joseph Thomas Walker (1908–1952), pioneer in forensic science
- Joseph A. Walker (colonel) (1835–1902), American Confederate colonel
- Joseph Walker (British Army officer) (1890–1965), British major-general, see List of British generals and brigadiers

== Fictional characters ==
- Joe Walker (private detective), a New York private investigator of the Kommissar X book and film series
- Private Joe Walker, from the British television sitcom Dad's Army
