= Ryan Walker =

Ryan Walker may refer to:

- Ryan Walker (cartoonist) (1870–1932), American socialist cartoonist for the Appeal to Reason and other publications
- Ryan Walker (rugby league) (born 1986), rugby league footballer
- Ryan Walker (soccer) (born 1974), retired American soccer forward
- Ryan Walker (baseball) (born 1995), American professional baseball pitcher
