= Ronald Walker =

Ronald or Ron Walker may refer to:

- Ron Walker (businessman) (Ronald Joseph Walker, 1939–2018), Australian businessman and Lord Mayor of Melbourne
- J. Ronald Walker, architect or builder of Payette City Hall and Courthouse in Payette, Idaho, USA
- Ron Walker (English footballer) (1932–2017), English football player for Doncaster Rovers and Bath City
- Ron Walker (Australian footballer) (1927–2005)
- (Ronald) Bruce Walker (politician, born 1897) (1897–1981), New South Wales politician
- Ronald Walker (cricketer) (1926–2011), Australian cricketer
- Ronald Walker (economist) (1907–1988), Australian diplomat and economist
- Ronald Walker (British politician) (1880–1971), Liberal politician in England
- Ronald Walker (weightlifter) (1907–1948), British Olympic weightlifter
- Ronald H. Walker (born 1937), first Director of the White House Office of Presidential Advance and American executive
- Ronald W. Walker (1939–2016), Mormon historian
- R. Tracy Walker (1939–2019), Republican politician in North Carolina
