= Lord Walker =

Lord Walker or Baron Walker may refer to:

- Harold Walker, Baron Walker of Doncaster (1927–2003), British politician
- Peter Walker, Baron Walker of Worcester (1932–2010), British politician
- Robert Walker, Baron Walker of Gestingthorpe (1938-2023), English barrister
- Michael Walker, Baron Walker of Aldringham (born 1944), retired British Army officer
- Richard Walker, Baron Walker of Broxton (born 1980), British businessman and politician
