= Aaron Walker =

Aaron Walker may refer to:

- T-Bone Walker (1910–1975), American musician
- Aaron Walker (American football) (born 1980), former American football player
- Aaron Walker (motorcyclist) in 2011 British Supersport Championship season
- Aaron Walker (soccer) (born 1990), American soccer player
