= Connie Walker =

Connie Walker may refer to:

- Connie Walker (astronomer) (born 1957), American astronomer
  - 29292 Conniewalker, a main belt asteroid, discovered in 1993
- Connie Walker (journalist) (born 1979), Canadian journalist
