= Fred Walker (footballer, born 1913) =

English footballer

Personal information
- Date of birth: 3 July 1913
- Place of birth: Wednesbury, England
- Date of death: 1978 (aged 64–65)
- Position: Defender

Senior career*
Years	Team	Apps	(Gls)
- Metro Shaft
- Wednesbury
1936–1937	Walsall	3	(0)
1937–1939	Sheffield Wednesday	12	(1)
1946–1947	Chelmsford City	12	(0)
- Stafford Rangers
- * Club domestic league appearances and goals

Fred Walker (3 July 1913 – 1978) was an English footballer who played as a defender.

== Career ==
Walker began his career with Metro Shaft, before moving to Wednesbury. Walker later moved to Walsall, before joining Sheffield Wednesday in 1937. Walker made 12 Football League appearances for Sheffield Wednesday, scoring once, over the course of almost two years, before the outbreak of World War II. During the war, Walker served in the British Army, being stationed overseas for five and a half years. In 1946, Walker signed for Chelmsford City. Following his time at Chelmsford, Walker signed for Stafford Rangers.
