= Walter Walker =

Walter Walker may refer to:

- Walter Walker (politician) (1883–1956), United States Senator from Colorado
- Walter Walker (British Army officer) (1912–2001), British general
- Walter M. Walker, pioneer of the U.S. state of Oregon
- Walt Walker (1860–1922), Major League Baseball player
- Wally Walker (born 1954), American basketball player
- Walter Walker (actor) (1864–1947), American actor
- Valter Walker (born 1997), Brazilian mixed martial artist
