= Sally Walker =

Sally Walker may refer to:

- Sally Walker (academic), Australian academic
- "Sally Walker" (song), by Iggy Azalea, 2019
- Sally M. Walker, American author
- Sally W. Walker (1929–2004), American politician
- Raynor Winn (born 1962), English author, born Sally Walker
