= Brad Walker =

Brad or Bradley Walker may refer to:

- Brad Walker (pole vaulter) (born 1981), American pole vaulter
- Brad Walker (footballer) (born 1996), English footballer
- Brad Walker (rugby league) (born 1998), English rugby league footballer
- Bradley Walker (musician) (born 1969), known as Butch Walker
- Bradley Walker (1877–1951), American attorney and golfer
- Bradley Walker (singer) (born 1978), American country singer and songwriter
- Mark Walker (North Carolina politician) (Bradley Mark Walker, born 1969)

== Fictional characters ==
- Bradley Walker, in the US police procedural TV series Bosch, played by John Getz

== See also ==
- Bradley Walker Tomlin (1899–1953), American painter
