= Karen Walker =

Karen Walker may refer to:

- Karen Walker (designer) (born 1969)
- Karen Walker (footballer) (born 1969)
- Karen Thompson Walker, American novelist
- Karen Walker, executive consultant known for her central role in Compaq's history.
- Karen Walker (Will & Grace)
- Karen Handel (née Walker; born 1962), American politician
