= Ty Walker =

Ty Walker or Tyrone Walker may refer to:

- Ty Walker (basketball) (born 1989), American basketball player
- Ty Walker (snowboarder) (born 1997), American snowboarder
- Tyrone S. Walker (born 1990), American rapper known as ASAP TyY
