= Margaret Walker (disambiguation) =

Margaret Walker (1915–1998) was an American poet and writer.

Margaret Walker may also refer to:

- Margaret Walker (athlete) (1925–2016), British sprinter
- Margaret Sellers Walker (1935–2020), American city and state official
- Margaret Urban Walker (born 1948), American philosopher
- Margaret Walker (EastEnders), a fictional character on the British soap opera played by Susan George
- Margaret Walker (speech therapist), (born 1938), British speech and language therapist

== See also ==
- Maggie L. Walker (1864–1934), American teacher and businesswoman
