= Shaun Walker =

Shaun Walker may refer to:

- Shaun Walker (software developer), creator of the DNN web application framework
- Shaun Walker (white supremacist), a leader of the National Alliance organization in the United States
- Shaun Walker (journalist) (born 1981), British journalist
