= Felix Walker =

Felix Walker is the name of:

- Felix Walker (American politician) (1753–1828), Republican U.S. Congressman from North Carolina
- Felix Walker (Swiss politician) (born 1935), member of the Swiss National Council from St. Gallen
