= Roger Walker =

Roger Walker may refer to:

- Roger Walker (actor) (born 1944), British actor
- Roger Walker (architect) (born 1942), New Zealand architect
- Roger Walker (footballer) (born 1966), English former professional footballer
- Roger Walker (rugby union) (1846–1919), English international rugby player and Lancashire cricketer
- Roger G. Walker (born 1939), Canadian geologist
