= Alfred Walker (fencer) =

American fencer

Personal information
- Born: October 23, 1901 Brooklyn, New York, United States
- Died: May 19, 1983 (aged 81) Fairfield, Connecticut, United States

Sport
- Sport: Fencing

Alfred Walker (October 23, 1901 – May 19, 1983) was an American fencer. He competed in the team foil event at the 1924 Summer Olympics.
