= Leroy Walker =

Leroy Walker may refer to:

- LeRoy Pope Walker (1817–1884), first Confederate States Secretary of War
- LeRoy T. Walker (1918–2012), first black president of the United States Olympic Committee
