= Governor Walker =

Governor Walker may refer to:

- Bill Walker (American politician) (born 1951), 11th Governor of Alaska
- Clifford Walker (1877–1954), 64th Governor of Georgia
- Dan Walker (politician) (1922–2015), 36th Governor of Illinois
- David S. Walker (1815–1891), 8th Governor of Florida
- Edward Noël Walker (1842–1908), Acting Governor of British Ceylon from 1895 to 1896
- Gilbert Carlton Walker (1833–1885), 36th Governor of Virginia
- James Walker (colonial administrator) (1809–1885), Governor of Barbados and the Windward Islands in 1859 and from 1862 to 1869
- Joseph Marshall Walker (1784–1856), 13th Governor of Louisiana
- Meriwether Lewis Walker (1869–1947), 4th Governor of the Panama Canal Zone
- Olene Walker (1930–2015), 15th Governor of Utah
- Robert J. Walker (1801–1869), Territorial Governor of Kansas in 1857
- Scott Walker (politician) (born 1967), 45th Governor of Wisconsin
- Thomas Gordon Walker (1849–1917), Governor of Punjab from 1907 to 1908
