= Wayne Walker =

Wayne Walker may refer to:

- Wayne Walker (linebacker) (1936–2017), American football player
- Wayne Walker (wide receiver) (born 1966), American football player
- Wayne Walker (songwriter) (1925–1979), American songwriter
