= Nathan Walker (disambiguation) =

Nathan Walker is an ice hockey player.

Nathan or Nate Walker may also refer to:

- Nathan Walker (footballer), New Zealand football player
- Nate Walker, American businessman and politician
- Nate Walka, American recording artist
- Nathan Walker, builder of Toaping Castle
- Nate Walker, character in Revolution (TV series)
