= Alf Walker (rugby union) =

South African rugby union player

- Full name: Alfred Percy Walker
- Born: 8 May 1893 Randfontein, South Africa
- Died: 17 July 1971 (aged 78)
- Height: 1.84 m (6 ft 0 in)
- Weight: 86.2 kg (190 lb)

Rugby union career
- Position: Flanker / Lock
Provincial / State sides
Years	Team	Apps	(Points)
- Natal
International career
Years	Team	Apps	(Points)
1921–24	South Africa	6	(0)

Alfred Percy Walker (8 May 1893 – 17 July 1971) was a South African international rugby union player.

Walker was born in the mining town of Randfontein outside Johannesburg and attended Randfontein High School. His elder brother Henry was capped for the Springboks against the 1910 British Lions.

A forward, Walker gained six Springboks caps. He featured twice as a loose forward against the All Blacks on their 1921 tour of New Zealand and played all four Test matches against the visiting 1924 British Lions, as a second rower.

Walker and son Harry, a 1950s prop, were the first father–son combination to be Springboks.

== See also ==
- List of South Africa national rugby union players
