= Cherryl Walker =

South African sociologist

- Education: UCT (MA, 1978)
- Scientific career
- Fields: Sociology; Social anthropology
- Workplaces: Stellenbosch University

Cherryl Walker is professor of sociology in the Department of Sociology and Social Anthropology at Stellenbosch University, which she joined in 2005, and is DSI/NRF SARChI Chair in the Sociology of Land, Environment and Sustainable Development at Stellenbosch since 2016. She is an authority on South African society - specialising in South Africa's land redistribution/restitution, land reform, gender and cosmopolitanism, and environmental sociology.

She was the Commissioner of Regional Land Claims in KwaZulu–Natal from 1995 to 2000.

== Education ==
She earned a master's from the University of Cape Town in 1978.

== Select publications ==
=== Books ===
- Walker, Cherryl (1979). The Women's Suffrage Movement in South Africa. Centre for African Studies, University of Cape Town, Communications. Centre for African Studies, University of Cape Town. ISBN 978-0-7992-0287-8.
- Walker, Cherryl; Platzky, Laurine (1985). The Surplus People : Forced Removals in South Africa. Johannesburg, South Africa: Ravan Press. p. 446. ISBN 9780869752555.

=== Journal articles ===
- Walker, Cherryl (2003). "Piety in the sky? Gender policy and land reform in South Africa". Journal of Agrarian Change. 3 (1–2): 113–148. Bibcode:2003JAgrC...3..113W. doi:10.1111/1471-0366.00052.
- Walker, Cherryl (1995). "Conceptualising Motherhood in Twentieth Century South Africa". Journal of Southern African Studies. 21 (3): 417–37. Bibcode:1995JSAfS..21..417W. doi:10.1080/03057079508708455. JSTOR 2637252.
- Walker, Cherryl (2005). "The Limits to Land Reform: Rethinking 'the Land Question'". Journal of Southern African Studies. 31 (4): 805–824. doi:10.1080/03057070500370597. JSTOR 25065048. S2CID 146797701.
