= Rod Walker =

American football player (born 1976)

No. 77, 95
- Position: Defensive tackle

Personal information
- Born: February 4, 1976 (age 50); Milton, Florida, U.S.
- Listed height: 6 ft 3 in (1.91 m)
- Listed weight: 320 lb (145 kg)

Career information
- High school: Milton
- College: Troy
- NFL draft: 1999: undrafted

Career history
- Washington Redskins (1999)*; Tennessee Titans (1999–2000); Green Bay Packers (2001–2003)
- * Offseason or practice squad member only

Career NFL statistics
- Games played - started: 31 - 6
- Tackles: 24
- Fumble recoveries: 2
- Stats at Pro Football Reference

Roderick Dion Walker (born February 4, 1976) is an American former professional football player who was a defensive tackle for three seasons with the Green Bay Packers of the National Football League (NFL). He played college football for the Troy Trojans.
