= Arthur Walker =

Arthur Walker may refer to:

- Arthur Abney Walker (1820–1894), British surgeon and botanist
- Arthur Walker (trade unionist), British trade unionist
- Arthur B. C. Walker Jr. (1936–2001), American space physicist
- Arthur Earl Walker (1907–1995), American neurosurgeon
- Arthur Campbell-Walker (1834–1887), British soldier and golf player
- Arthur Geoffrey Walker (1909–2001), English mathematician and physicist
- Arthur Henry Walker (1833–1878), English cricketer
- Arthur Walker (Irish cricketer) (1891–1968), Irish cricketer
- Arthur George Walker (1861–1939), British sculptor and painter
- Art Walker (gridiron football) (Arthur D. Walker Jr., 1933–1973), American and Canadian football player
- Arthur Walker (spy) (1934–2014), American, convicted with brother of espionage in 1985
- Art Walker (triple jumper) (Arthur Franklin Walker, born 1941), American triple jump athlete
- Arthur Walker (pilot) (1953–2016), South African Air Force pilot
- Arthur Horace Walker (1881–1947), British Royal Navy officer
