= Jefferson Cobb Walker =

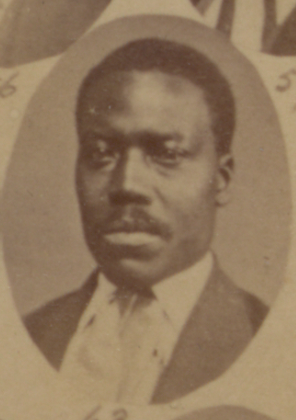

Jefferson Cobb Walker (July 4, 1845 – 1920) was an American minister, laborer, and state legislator in Mississippi.

He represented Monroe County, Mississippi in the Mississippi House of Representatives in 1874 and 1875.

He was born in Mississippi. He was ordained a Baptist minister in 1882 and presided at Artesia Baptist Church until 1892. He served as vice-president of the Baptist State Convention in 1892.

Walker died in 1920 in Clay County, Mississippi.

== See also ==
- African American officeholders from the end of the Civil War until before 1900
