= Marty Walker (baseball) =

American baseball player (1899-1978)

- Pitcher
- Born: March 27, 1899; Philadelphia, Pennsylvania
- Died: April 24, 1978 (aged 79); Philadelphia, Pennsylvania
- Batted: Left Threw: Left

MLB debut
- September 30, 1928, for the Philadelphia Phillies

Last MLB appearance
- September 30, 1928, for the Philadelphia Phillies

MLB statistics
- Games pitched: 1
- Win–loss record: 0–1
- Earned run average: Infinite and undefined
- Strikeouts: 0

Teams
- Philadelphia Phillies (1928)

Martin Van Buren "Marty" Walker (March 27, 1899 – April 24, 1978) was an American professional baseball pitcher. Walker played one game for the 1928 Philadelphia Phillies, getting the start on the last day of the season. In his only career game, he did not record an out, giving up two hits and three walks before being pulled. He ended up giving up four runs, two of them earned (giving him a career ERA of infinity) and was tagged with the loss as the Phillies lost to the Brooklyn Robins 5-1. He batted and threw left-handed.

Walker was born and died in Philadelphia, Pennsylvania.
