= Sayer Walker =

English physician

- Born: 1748; London
- Died: 9 November 1826 (aged 77–78)
- Occupation: Physician

Sayer Walker (1748 – 9 November 1826) was an English physician.

== Biography ==
Walker was born in London in 1748. After school education he became a presbyterian minister at Enfield, Middlesex, but afterwards studied medicine in London and Edinburgh, graduated M.D. at Aberdeen on 31 Dec. 1791, and became a licentiate of the College of Physicians of London on 25 June 1792. He was in June 1794 elected physician to the city of London Lying-in Hospital, and his chief practice was midwifery. He retired to Clifton, near Bristol, six months before his death on 9 November 1826. He published in 1796 ‘A Treatise on Nervous Diseases,’ and in 1803 ‘Observations on the Constitution of Women.’ His writings contain nothing of permanent value.
