= Captain Martin Walker =

Video game character

- Spec Ops character
- Martin Walker from Spec Ops: The Line
- First appearance: Spec Ops: The Line (2012)
- Created by: Yager Development
- Voiced by: Nolan North

In-universe information
- Nationality: American

Captain Martin Walker is the protagonist and player character of the 2012 third-person shooter video game Spec Ops: The Line, the seventh entry of the Spec Ops series, developed by German studio Yager Development and published by 2K Games. Created principally by lead writer Walt Williams, Walker was conceived as a subversion of the heroic military-shooter protagonist. Voiced by Nolan North, Walker is a Delta Force captain sent with a three-man reconnaissance team into a disaster-stricken Dubai, where he searces for his former superior, Lieutenant Colonel John Konrad, who is last known to be leading the city's evacuation and relief efforts. His eventual decision to exceed the mission's orders leads him to commit escalating acts of violence, and experience hallucinations which left some events within the game's narrative ambiguous and open to interpretation.

Walker's physical injuries, increasingly aggressive dialogue and distorted perception depict his psychological deterioration, while critics and scholars have analysed the character in relation to player agency, guilt, military heroism and the conventions of violent video games.

== Concept and design ==
In an interview with GamesRadar, lead writer Walt Williams explained that the development team of Spec Ops: The Line desired to do a "dramatic, more raw war story", something that no other entity in the video game industry was attempting at the time. The story arc of its protagonist, Captain Martin Walker, is written to subvert the military shooter genre in a number of ways. In particular, it undermines the notion that intervention from the United States military is based on virtue; challenges the portrayal of war in popular media which is often inconspicuously devoid of civilian casualties; highlights the traumatic effect of war on surviving soldiers; and exposes the ambiguities between battlefield friends and enemies.

The character's surname Walker was chosen because he would end up traversing much of the game's levels by foot. Walker is initially presented with a personality that evokes a virtuous military serviceman archetype: clean cut, courteous to his colleagues, and respectful of the rules of military engagement. The writing for the camaraderie between Walker and his squad mates was inspired by HBO's Generation Kill. As every motivation Walker has in the game is designed to mirror the motivation of someone who plays a video game, his emotional state is often explicitly reflected to the player. Because the player and Walker is intended to be the same person according to the game's design philosophy, the character is presented as an "average guy" who is relatable to the player in spite of his special forces training background.

Walker is initially represented as a clean-shaven, well-equipped and professionally restrained soldier. His subsequent deterioration is conveyed through both his visual design and his battle dialogue. Lead designer Cory Davis described the team's attempt behind such a characterization to be "tough", as they wanted to express as strongly as possible how Walker would evolve from a "blank canvas" to a psychologically damaged person after experiencing some calamitous events within the story. Walker’s appearance and demeanor grows more ragged or unhinged the closer he gets to his target and is indicative of the toll it has taken on his sanity following hours of intense firefights. The 1990 film Jacob's Ladder provides a reference point in characterizing Walker's post-war traumatic experience.

In his book Significant Zero: Heroes, Villains, and the Fight for Art and Soul in Video Games, Williams explained that much of the game's events are intentionally left open to interpretation. From his point of view, Walker died in a helicopter crash at the end of the game's prologue and that the entirety of its narrative afterwards exists in a state of purgatory, hallucinated by Walker as he lay dying in the wreckage. The prologue sequence itself, which begins in medias res with a helicopter chase involving Walker's squad, was mandated by senior management overseeing the development team. In response, Williams decided to discreetly alter the context of the game's story by asking the characters' voice actors to re-record a few alternate lines for the sequence, which shows Walker experiencing a déjà vu moment later in the story. Williams revealed that Konrad was originally intended to remain alive and confront Walker at the top of a Dubai skyscraper; at one point during the development of The Line, Williams decided to reframe the story. He introduced a plot twist which takes place by the end of The Line, which reveals that Konrad was already dead prior to the arrival of Walker's squad in Dubai and that he was in fact hallucinating Konrad's messages to him the entire time. Williams explained that Walker's unstable psychological state is due in part to his denial over the atrocities he unwittingly committed against innocent civilians earlier in the narrative. From William's pont of view, Walker's central flaw is his refusal to abandon a failing mission, which causes him to interpret escalating violence as evidence of his own heroism.

=== Portrayal ===
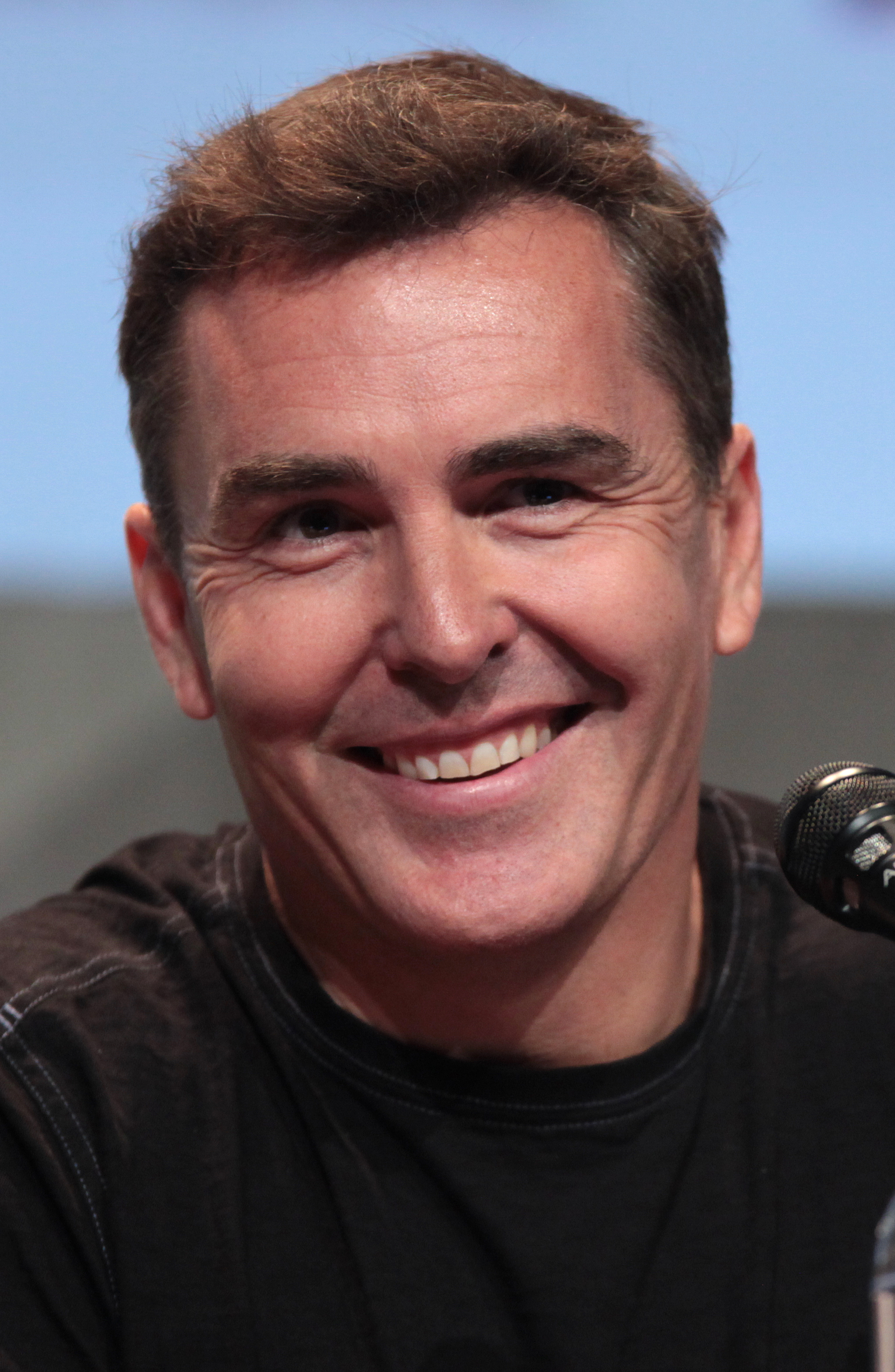
Nolan North at a fan convention.

Nolan North voiced Walker. North said that he generally adhered to the script because he considered the writing consistently strong, rather than improvising merely for the sake of departing from the prepared dialogue. He described The Line as one of the most psychologically intense projects in which he had participated, saying that players were placed within Walker's mind rather than simply assuming his physical role. North contrasted Walker with conventionally invulnerable shooter protagonists, describing him as a committed soldier who remains psychologically and emotionally human.

Nolan described The Line as "one of the most psychologically thrilling games" he had been involved with, because it is focused on the psyche of the soldier in combat and how they could be affected by their circumstances. North explained that with Walker, players are actually "walking in his mind" as opposed to walking in his shoes. This connects players with Walker at an emotional level that very few shooter games will reach in North's opinion, as soldier characters are often portrayed in an overly simplistic manner as individuals who are seemingly invincible physically and mentally. North explained that Walker is "a soldier, through and through, but he’s also just a man", and that ultimately he just needed to put as much of himself into the character in order to prepare for his role.

== Appearances ==
In Spec Ops: The Line, Walker leads a Delta Force squad comprising First Lieutenant Alphonso Adams and Staff Sergeant John Lugo into a sandstorm-devastated Dubai. Their orders are limited to locating survivors and reporting on the status of the United States Army's 33rd Infantry Battalion, which had remained in the city under Walker's former commander, Colonel John Konrad. After encountering hostilities between the 33rd, local insurgents and CIA operatives, Walker exceeds his orders and decides to locate Konrad himself.

During an assault on a fortified position known as the Gate, Walker orders his squad to deploy white phosphorus against the defending soldiers. They subsequently discover that the attack also killed civilians whom the 33rd had been sheltering, and Walker experiences a mental breakdown. Rather than accept responsibility, Walker blames Konrad and continues deeper into Dubai. As he begins to receive radio messages from Konrad, Walker's behaviour becomes increasingly violent. The squad's actions contribute to the destruction of Dubai's remaining water supply, and both Lugo and Adams are killed before Walker reaches Konrad's headquarters.

Walker discovers that Konrad had committed suicide before Delta Force entered Dubai and that the commander with whom he had been communicating was a hallucination created to displace responsibility for his own actions. The player's final decisions determine whether Walker kills himself or rejects the hallucination. A surviving Walker may surrender to an arriving American patrol, provoke the soldiers into killing him, or he may kill them and remain in Dubai.

== Reception and analysis ==
=== Critical reception ===
As the player character of Spec Ops: The Line, Captain Martin Walker has been the subject of extensive discussion by critics, with regards to how video games address and define player agency. Writing for the 2017 publication 100 Greatest Video Game Characters, Nick Robinson noted that through the actions that the player has to undertake in the game and Walker's deterioration physically and mentally as a consequence of the player's actions, his character "forces reflection" on the notion of a video game about war as well as its players who "play war". Robinson emphasized the fact that Walker is represented in third-person in The Line, unlike many video protagonists within the shooter game genre, which explicitly presents the player with the deterioration of Walker's moral judgment and emotional state, not only though his increasing mental instability but also through the physical scarring of his body. Brendan Keogh described Walker's character development as a "character study of the average videogame protagonist coming to terms with the messed up things we players make them do", a feature that is "completely absent from the majority of videogame stories" and The Line's most important achievement.

In an article written for PopMatters, G. Christopher Williams offered a less enthusiastic view of the creative direction behind Walker's story arc and opined that the set-up of the game's "win-state" that culminates in an inevitable loss is a "tragedy". Williams explained that The Line essentially "reverses" the plot of Heart of Darkness, a major inspiration of The Line, and that Walker’s character development differs from most other video game characters as it is far from positive and does not lead players on a journey to a emotional state of mind where they would feel "empowered, practiced, and competent". He argued that it leads to "an effort that has to be endured because the end seems as if it is almost in sight", and that "psychic suicide feels warranted" for Walker after what he has done as controlled by the player over the course of The Line. Writing for the New York Times, Chris Suellentrop criticized the game's heavy-handed handling of its dark themes and the lack of subtlety with the way it presents Walker’s obtuseness regarding the horrific consequences of his actions.

Walker has appeared in multiple "top" character lists. IGN included Walker among its best new video game characters of 2012. Geoff Thiew from Hardcore Gamer ranked Walker among a 2014 list of the most memorable soldier characters in video games, citing the exploration of his struggle with post-traumatic stress disorder and his story conveys a potent message about the veneration of warfare by popular media. Ron Whitaker discussed Walker's significance as a notable video game protagonist in a 2015 list published by The Escapist.

Walker is often cited as one of the most notable roles of Nolan North, a prolific voice actor in the video game industry. In an essay written for Grantland, Tom Bissell considered North's casting integral to Walker's characterization. He observed that Walker initially sounds similar to Nathan Drake, another character voiced by North, before Walker's physical deterioration and increasingly unhinged combat dialogue reveal the purpose of the comparison: to transform the familiar, optimistic action-game protagonist into someone visibly descending into madness. Keogh took a different view and argued that The Line delivers its critique of shooter games by suggesting that video game protagonists like Drake and Walker are sociopaths because of what they do in their games as directed by the player.

=== Analysis ===
Walker's story arc have been analysed by multiple media scholars and peer-reviewed journals.

Henrik Andergard analyzed Walker's role in the narrative of The Line in his discussion of the concept of a traditional hero-narrative as well as the essential elements of the hero-character archetype. He concluded that Walker is a "conscious subversion of the modern military hero-narrative", and that the developers initially sets up expectations of The Line adhering to the genre and theme, which is later flaunted and actively criticized through Walker's failure to live up to that role. Felix Schröter and Jan-Noël Thon observed that the game carries injuries represented in cutscenes into subsequent gameplay and gradually changes Walker's dialogue from restrained military commands to profane and aggressive outbursts. They noted, however, that his underlying combat abilities remain largely unaffected, creating a contrast between Walker's deterioration as a fictional person and his mechanical stability as a player-controlled game piece.

Toby Smethurst was fascinated by the premise of The Line, which involves the player in the interactive perpetration of atrocities through a gradual process of coming to empathize with Walker. He observed that even though The Line seemingly "punishes the player for playing it" by holding up their actions as an example of their complicity in violent content within video games, it remains compelling "in spite of, or perhaps because of its attitude towards videogame violence". He argued that The Line showed that the videogame medium has the potential to radically alter its players' relationship with "controversial memories of perpetration" by demonstrating the extent to which a strong empathic link between the player and its protagonist is possible, which provides a reasonable contrast against the direction most memory studies tend to adopt by universalizing the innocent’s perspective in the wake of violent conflict.

Lars de Wildt argued that The Line deliberately separates the player from Walker rather than presenting them as a single subject. In his analysis, the player is required to follow the conventions and mechanical demands of a military shooter, while Walker is represented as a distinct character who reflects upon the consequences of those actions. De Wildt described the resulting conflict as a form of ludonarrative dissonance that estranges players from the violence they perform through Walker.

Steven Holmes interpreted Konrad as Walker's Gothic double and as a projection of the guilt Walker represses after the white-phosphorus attack. Holmes argued that Walker's hallucinations and psychological collapse result from his refusal to accept responsibility for killing civilians through military technology that had given him a false sense of certainty. He further observed that the game's endings reinforce the parallel between Walker and Konrad by allowing Walker either to repeat Konrad's suicide or assume his position within Dubai.
