= George Walker =

George Walker may refer to:

== Arts and letters ==
- George Walker (chess player) (1803–1879), English chess player and writer
- George Walker (composer) (1922–2018), American composer
- George Walker (illustrator) (1781–1856), author of The Costume of Yorkshire
- George Walker (novelist) (1772–1847), English gothic novelist
- George Walker (printmaker) (born 1960), Canadian writer, artist and printmaker
- George Walker (privateer) (died 1777), British privateer
- George Walker (Puritan) (1581–1651), English clergyman
- George Walker (vaudeville) (1873–1911), American vaudeville singer, partner of Bert Williams
- Benjamin Walker (author) (George Benjamin Walker, 1913–2013), author on religion and philosophy, and authority on esoterica
- George F. Walker (born 1947), Canadian playwright and screenwriter
- George P. L. Walker (1926–2005), volcanologist
- George T. Walker (1913–2011), president of the University of Louisiana at Monroe, 1958–1976

== Business ==
- George Alfred Walker (1929–2011), British businessman, founder of Brent Walker
- George Herbert Walker (1875–1953), American businessman, grandfather of George Herbert Walker Bush
- George Herbert Walker Jr. (1905–1977), co-founder of the New York Mets baseball team
- George Herbert Walker IV (born 1969), chairman and chief executive officer, Neuberger Berman
- George Paterson Walker (1864–1926), oldest son of whisky maker Alexander Walker
- George Ziziros Walker (1909–1991), Australian businessman and casino operator
- George Walker (CPR president), president of the Canadian Pacific Railway

== Politics and military ==
- Sir George Walker, 1st Baronet (1764–1842), British general, of the Forestier-Walker baronets
- George Walker (attorney) (1824–1888), Massachusetts state congressman, banker, corporate executive, political adviser, advocate for bimetallism and U.S. consul-general in Paris
- George Walker (Kentucky politician) (1763–1819), U.S. senator from Kentucky
- George Walker (soldier) (c. 1645–1690), clergyman and English colonel in Ireland
- George Walker (born 1736 or 1737), baptismal name of Boston Jersey, an enslaved Royal Navy sailor
- George Gustavus Walker (1831–1897), British Conservative member of parliament
- George Walker (MP for Rossendale) (1874–1954), British member of parliament for Rossendale, 1945–1950
- George Herbert Walker III (1931–2020), American businessman, US ambassador to Hungary
- George J. Walker (1934–2005), U.S. general, military intelligence

== Sport ==
- George Walker (Australian footballer) (1894–1973), Australian rules footballer
- George Walker (1880s pitcher) (1856–1908), Canadian Major League Baseball player
- George Walker (cricketer, born 1919) (1919–1995), English cricketer
- George Walker (cricketer, born 1984), English cricketer
- George Walker (footballer, born 1877) (1877–1930), English football full-back with Crystal Palace
- George Walker (footballer, born 1909) (1909–?), Scottish international footballer
- George Walker (footballer, born 1934) (1934–2012), English football inside forward with Bristol City and Carlisle United
- George Walker (1930s pitcher) (1915–1967), American Negro leagues baseball player
- George Walker (wrestler), Canadian wrestler
- George Glossop Walker (1860–1908), English cricketer
- George R. Walker, American football and basketball coach, and former hurdler
- George Croxton Walker, British military officer

== Others ==
- George Walker (mathematician) (c. 1730–1807), English Dissenter and mathematician
- George H. Walker (1811–1866), helped found Milwaukee, Wisconsin
- George W. Walker (1896–1993), automotive industrial designer
- George Washington Walker (1800–1859), missionary for the church called Religious Society of Friends, or Quakers
- Sir George Casson Walker (1854–1925), British administrator in the Indian Civil Service
- George Walker (South Africa) (1853–1924), one of the alleged discoverers of the main gold reef on the Witwatersrand
- George Walker, member of Ken Kesey's Merry Pranksters and first husband of Carolyn Garcia

== See also ==
- George Walker Bush (born 1946), president of the United States (2001–2009)
- George Herbert Walker Bush (1924–2018), president of the United States (1989–1993), used pseudonym "George Walker"
