= George Harrison (disambiguation) =

George Harrison (1943–2001) was an English musician and the lead guitarist of the Beatles.

George Harrison may also refer to:

== Arts and entertainment ==
- George Henry Harrison (1816–1846), English watercolour painter
- George Harrison Marks (1926–1997), English photographer and director
- George Harrison (album), a 1979 album by George Harrison

== Business ==
- George L. Harrison (1887–1958), American banker
- G. Charter Harrison (1881–1959), Anglo-American management consultant and cost account pioneer
- George McGregor Harrison (1895–1968), American labor leader

== Politics ==
- Sir George Harrison (1767–1841), British jurist and government administrator
- George Harrison (Hertford MP) (1680–1759), British MP for Hertford, 1727–1734 and 1741–1759
- George Harrison (Irish republican) (1915–2004), arms trafficker for the Provisional Irish Republican Army
- George Harrison (Lord Provost) (1811–1885), Lord Provost of Edinburgh, philanthropist and briefly Member of Parliament for Edinburgh South
- George Moffett Harrison (1847–1923), American politician and judge in Virginia
- George Paul Harrison Jr. (1841–1922), American politician, U.S. Representative from Alabama, Confederate States Army colonel
- George Paul Harrison Sr. (1813–1888), American politician, Georgia House of Representatives, Georgia (Confederate) militia general
- George W. Harrison (1867–1931), journalist, newspaper editor and publisher, and North Dakota politician

== Sports ==
- George Harrison (cricketer, born 1860) (1860–1900), English cricketer
- George Harrison (Yorkshire cricketer) (1862–1940), English cricketer
- George Harrison (Glamorgan cricketer) (1895–1???), English cricketer
- George Harrison (footballer, born 1892) (1892–1939), professional footballer for Everton, and England international
- George Harrison (footballer, born 1900) (1900–1969), English footballer for Durham City, Darlington, Carlisle United
- George Harrison (swimmer) (1939–2011), American swimmer

== Other ==
- George H. Harrison (1841–1919), American sailor and Medal of Honor recipient
- George R. Harrison (1898–1979), American physicist
- George Harrison (prospector), Australian discoverer of gold in the Transvaal, which led to the Witwatersrand Gold Rush of 1886

== See also ==
- Harrison George, American activist
