= George Herbert Walker (disambiguation) =

George Herbert Walker was an American banker.

George Herbert Walker may also refer to:

- George Herbert Walker Jr., businessman and son of the banker.
- George Herbert Walker III, United States Ambassador to Hungary from 2003 to 2006 and son of the businessman
- George Herbert Walker IV, chairman and CEO of Neuberger Berman and son of the Ambassador

== See also ==
- George Herbert Walker Bush, 41st President of the United States (1989–1993)
