= Thomas Walker (slave trader) =

British slave trader, born 1758

- Born: 1758; Henbury, Bristol, England
- Died: 1797 (aged 38–39) at sea
- Cause of death: Murder
- Occupation: Slave trader
- Spouse: Catherine McLelland
- Children: 2 sons, 1 daughter, including George E. Walker
- Relatives: David Davis Walker (grandson); George Herbert Walker (great-grandson); George Herbert Walker Jr. (great-great-grandson); George H. W. Bush (great-great-great-grandson); George W. Bush (great-great-great-great-grandson)

Thomas Walker (1758–1797) (a.k.a. Beau Walker) was a British slave trader.

== Early life ==
Thomas Walker was born 1758 in Henbury, now a suburb of Bristol, England.

== Career ==
Walker worked as a slave trader, when Bristol was one of the three major slave trading ports in Britain. He served as a slave ship Captain and was resident slave trader who operated in the Sierra Leone region of West Africa.

He did much of his slave trading at Bunce Island, a British slave castle in the Sierra Leone River, owned at that time by the Company of John & Alexander Anderson, based in London. He was involved in at least eleven slave trading voyages between 1784 and 1792, taking African captives from Sierra Leone to the British West Indies and the United States.

== Personal life ==
On 22 February 1785, Walker married Catherine McLelland (1770–1806) at St. Andrew's Church in Clifton. She died on 18 October 1806, in Philadelphia, Pennsylvania, a decade after her husband, leaving their older son as the guardian for his sister and a younger son, George E. Walker (1797–1864).

== Death and legacy ==
Walker was murdered in 1797 at sea in a mutiny.
