= John M. Walker =

American physician and investment banker

John M. Walker Sr.
- Born: January 15, 1909; St. Louis, Missouri, US
- Died: August 16, 1990 (aged 81); Biddeford, Maine, US
- Education: Yale University (BS); Columbia University (MD)
- Occupations: Investment banker, G. H. Walker & Co., Alex. Brown & Sons
- Medical career
- Profession: Physician
- Field: Clinical assistant in surgery, 1949–1967; Chief physician (Hospital president), 1967–1975
- Institutions: Memorial Sloan–Kettering Cancer Center
- Military career
- Branch: United States Army
- Rank: Major
- Conflicts: World War II

John Mercer Walker Sr. (January 15, 1909 – August 16, 1990) was an American medical doctor and investment banker. A member of the prominent Bush-Walker family, he was a maternal uncle of US President George H. W. Bush.

== Biography ==
Walker was the fifth of six children of banker and businessman George Herbert Walker and his wife Lucretia Wear, daughter of James H. Wear. (Walker's older sister Dorothy married President Bush's father Senator Prescott Bush.) Walker attended The Hill School and later Yale University, where he lettered in football, baseball and squash, was a member of Skull and Bones, and graduated in 1931. In 1936, Walker graduated from the Columbia University College of Physicians and Surgeons and went on to his residency at Roosevelt Hospital.

In 1939, he married Elsie Louise Mead, daughter of George Houk Mead, president of the Mead Corporation. They had three sons and four daughters. One daughter died of polio in 1955 and two daughters were born with Down syndrome.

During World War II he served as a major in the US Army in Europe. Walker had a private practice until he was diagnosed with polio in 1950. A skilled athlete and golfer, he would eventually need a wheelchair. In 1952, he joined Memorial Hospital (now part of Memorial Sloan–Kettering Cancer Center) as a clinical assistant in surgery and remained with the institution for 25 years, serving as president from 1965 to 1974.

In 1953, future President Bush's daughter Pauline Robinson "Robin" Bush was diagnosed with leukemia. A local doctor advised them that treatment was futile, but Walker helped her get admitted to Memorial Sloan–Kettering. She lived another six months and died shortly before her fourth birthday. President Bush later wrote about his uncle:

He was a great cancer surgeon, who had been stricken with polio. A strong and purposeful man. I told him of our local doc's advise and he said "You have no choice - none at all - you must treat this child. You must do all you can to keep her alive" and he went on to tell me of the strides in the field and of the importance of hope. So we treated her, and we watched her die before our eyes, but we also saw the wonders of remission and the dedication of the nurses and doctors, and we saw progress and we knew his advice was right. Six months later when it was all over - I thought back with gratitude for this sensible advice ...

Walker had a second career as an investment banker. He became a managing partner in G. H. Walker & Co., founded by his father in 1900, and a limited partner in Alex. Brown & Sons. In 1971, he retired to a farm in Easton, Maryland which for two decades he ran profitably for a third career. He spent summers with his extended family in Kennebunkport, Maine.

In 1989, President Bush appointed Walker's eldest son District Judge John M. Walker Jr. to the United States Court of Appeals for the Second Circuit. Bush told a White House lawyer "It's the least I can do for someone whose father did so much for me. Besides, Johnny's as well qualified as anyone else for the position."

Walker died in 1990 of an aneurysm, in a hospital in Biddeford, Maine.
