= Bert Walker =

Bert or Herbert Walker may refer to:

- Herbert Walker (architect) (1846–1937), architect and surveyor in Nottingham
- Herbert Ashcombe Walker (1868–1949), British railway manager
- Laudie Walker (Herbert Franklin Walker, 1898–1962), American baseball player
- Bert Walker (politician) (1919–2008), New Zealand politician
- George Herbert Walker III (1931–2020), a.k.a. Bert Walker, US ambassador to Hungary
- Herbert Walker, former governor of the Bank of Jamaica

== See also ==
- Hubert Walker, American football player
- Albert Walker (disambiguation)
- Robert Walker (disambiguation)
- George Herbert Walker (disambiguation)
