= CGG =

CGG may refer to:

== Organisations ==
- CGG (company), a multi-national geophysical services company, formerly known as CGGVeritas, and Compagnie Générale de Géophysique
- Canadian Grenadier Guards, infantry regiment of Canada's military reserve force
- Church of the Great God, headquartered in South Carolina, US
- Campaign for Good Governance, in Sierra Leone

== Science ==
- CGG, a codon for the amino acid arginine
  - CGG repeats, a trinucleotide repeat disorder; causing:
    - Fragile X syndrome
    - Fragile X-associated tremor/ataxia syndrome

== Other uses ==
- Kiga language (ISO-639 language code), a Great Lakes Bantu language

== See also ==
- DNA and RNA codon tables
