= Joseph Opala =

American historian

Joseph Opala OR
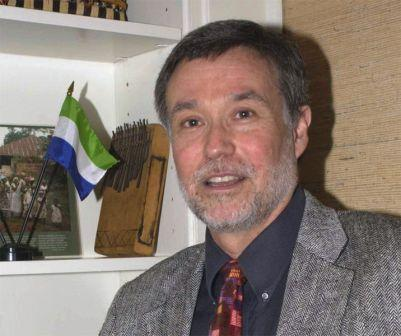
- Born: August 4, 1950 (age 76); Oklahoma City, Oklahoma, U.S.
- Occupations: American educator and academic
- Writing career
- Genres: History of Sierra Leone, Gullah Culture, Public history
- Subject: African diaspora

Joseph A. Opala, OR (born August 4, 1950) is an American historian noted for establishing the "Gullah Connection," the historical links between the indigenous people of the West African nation of Sierra Leone and the Gullah people of the Low Country region of South Carolina and Georgia in the United States.

Opala's historical research began with a study of Bunce Island, the British slave castle in Sierra Leone that was a departure point for many African slaves shipped to South Carolina and Georgia in the mid- and late 18th century Middle Passage. He was the first scholar to recognize that Bunce Island has greater importance for the Gullah than any other West African slave castle. He ranks it as "the most important historic site in Africa for the United States."

Opala has traveled between Sierra Leone and the South Carolina and Georgia Low Country for 30 years, producing documentary films, museum exhibits, and popular publications on this historical connection. He is best known for a series of "Gullah Homecomings" in which Gullah people traveled to Sierra Leone to explore their historical and family ties to that country. He has drawn on his original research to establish these connections, and the work of earlier scholars, especially Lorenzo Dow Turner, an African-American linguist who in the 1930s and 1940s traced many elements of Gullah speech to West African languages.

Opala's research and public history events generated a national dialog in Sierra Leone on the subject of family lost in the Atlantic slave trade. These discussions have continued for almost three decades. The Sierra Leone media first coined the phrase, "Gullah Connection," for the family ties which Opala has brought to light. He helped generate a similar dialog in the South Carolina and Georgia Low Country, where he has given public lectures and interviews to the local media, and organized workshops for teachers and cultural activists for many years. His work has helped Gullahs recognize their links to African traditions.

Opala's efforts to bring Sierra Leoneans and Gullahs together through an exploration of their common history have been recognized in both countries. In 2012, Sierra Leone's President Ernest Bai Koroma awarded Opala the Order of the Rokel, that country's version of the British knighthood, and Sierra Leone citizenship the following year. Opala is now a dual citizen of the U.S. and Sierra Leone. Penn Center, the oldest Gullah community organization in the United States, in 2013 inducted Opala into its prestigious "1862 Circle" for his work in cultural preservation.

== Early life and education ==
Joseph Opala was born in Oklahoma City, Oklahoma in 1950. His father Marian P. Opala (1921–2010) fought in the Polish Underground in World War II and immigrated to the U.S. in 1947. Opala's father was imprisoned in a Nazi concentration camp (Flossenbürg) during the war, and lost all contact with his surviving family in Poland during the Cold War period that followed. Opala grew up immersed in the effects of World War II and the separation of families. Later his father became an attorney and was appointed as an Oklahoma Supreme Court Justice.

During high school years, Opala was an active member of the Oklahoma Anthropological Society, participating in weekend digs on prehistoric Native American sites in his home state. He spent his summers doing volunteer work in the Oklahoma Historical Society archives. During college, he took part in an archaeological dig run by the University of Wisconsin at Cahokia Mounds, a major Mississippian culture site in Illinois. He also did independent ethnographic research among the Lacandon Indians in Southern Mexico. Opala earned B.A. and M.A. degrees in anthropology at the University of Arizona and the University of Oklahoma, but later turned his attention to history. He did post-graduate study at the School of Oriental and African Studies at the University of London.

== Early work in Sierra Leone (1974-1979) ==
Opala's interest in Sierra Leone began with his service in the U.S. Peace Corps from 1974 to 1977. He was assigned to a Limba village in Tonkolili District, where his job was to introduce modern rice cultivation methods derived from the Green Revolution concepts then popular. While plowing a field, Opala spotted some ancient African pottery and European trade goods, including glass beads. He realized that the area where he was working, which lay along the Rokel River, was on one of the trade routes that connected the interior and the sea coast during the Atlantic slave trade period.

Opala took his discoveries to Freetown, Sierra Leone's capital city. Aided by the Peace Corps country director, he was assigned as "Staff Archaeologist" to the Sierra Leone National Museum and the Institute of African Studies at Fourah Bay College. U.S. Ambassador Michael Samuels urged him to focus his efforts on Bunce Island. He conducted research there under the Peace Corps's aegis through 1977, then spent another year doing further research under a grant from the U.S. National Endowment for the Humanities.

At the time, there was little historic research published about Bunce Island, and documentation was scarce. The few Sierra Leoneans who had heard of it thought the Portuguese had built the castle. Opala drew on history, archaeology, and oral traditions to learn more. He found historical evidence that British slave traders controlled Bunce Island during its entire history. Cutting back the vegetation and studying the ruins, he was the first scholar to identify the functions of the major buildings, including Bance Island House (the headquarters), the men's and women's slave yards, and the underground gunpowder magazine.

Opala interviewed the Temne elders on the neighboring islands about their oral histories related to Bunce Island. He found that the local fishermen called the island by a variant of its original name -- "Bence Island" —and that the descendants of Bunce Island's African workers lived in a village a few miles upriver. He also discovered that for at least 250 years, the local people have associated a "devil" or nature spirit, with the "Devil's Rocks" lying off the north end of Bunce Island. They have continued long held rituals to propitiate that spirit to the present day.

After Opala left Sierra Leone in 1979, he did archival research in the US and UK. He discovered that many of the slaves who passed through Bunce Island were shipped to South Carolina and Georgia. The rice planters in those colonies were eager to purchase captives from Sierra Leone and other parts of West Africa where they were skilled in growing rice. He also found that there were strong linguistic connections between the Gullah people, the descendants of the rice-growing slaves still living in coastal South Carolina and Georgia today, and Sierra Leone. Linguists had been pointing to those connections for years without having the historical data to explain them. Opala wanted to return to Sierra Leone to share this new information with its people.

== Public history from Sierra Leone (1985-1997) ==
Soon after returning to Sierra Leone, Opala gave a well-publicized lecture on Bunce Island and that country's connection to the Gullah people at the US Embassy. Sierra Leoneans were delighted to learn about the group of African Americans, descendants of ancestors from their region, who had retained cultural traits and food dishes similar to theirs and a language related to their Krio language. Opala had many media requests for interviews, and people soon began to stop him on the street to ask about their Gullah "cousins."

Inspired by the popular reaction, Opala developed a series of public history initiatives that focused on Bunce Island and the "Gullah Connection" to the United States. These included public lectures, radio interviews, film shows and newspaper articles, and workshops for teachers and students. But his most successful effort was the "Gullah Homecoming" he organized in 1989 for a group of Gullah community leaders who wanted to see Sierra Leone for themselves. Their arrival galvanized the attention of the entire nation. The local media followed the visitors' every move during their week in Sierra Leone.

Opala lectured in the Institute of African Studies at Sierra Leone's Fourah Bay College (FBC) from 1985 to 1992, using his academic base to advance his Gullah Connection work. He acted as an adviser on cultural policy to President Joseph Saidu Momoh and the U.S. Ambassadors who served in Sierra Leone at that time. He also established a relationship with the U.S. National Park Service (NPS), and during his trips back to the US, he convinced NPS officials to send an expert team to survey Bunce Island in 1989. After seeing the castle, one of the NPS experts said he had "never seen an historic site so important for the United States in such desperate need of preservation." Later, Opala helped persuade Herb Cables, then deputy director of NPS, to see Bunce Island for himself. Cables arrived in April 1992 with a pledge of $5 million for Bunce Island's preservation. That same month, Opala took Colin Powell to Bunce Island, and after seeing it, Powell was deeply moved. He later described the experience in his autobiography, My American Journey. He said: "I am an American...But today, I am something more..I am an African too...I feel my roots here in this continent." But a military coup that occurred soon after Cables and Powell's visit interrupted work on the project, as the new NPRC military government had no interest in it.

After the Sierra Leone Civil War erupted, Opala joined with two Sierra Leonean human rights activists, Zainab Bangura and Julius Spencer, to establish the Campaign for Good Governance (CGG). CGG worked with other civil society groups to promote a democratic election to unseat the military junta. During the run-up to Sierra Leone's 1996 election, CGG encouraged citizens to vote. When the election was held, thousands took to the streets to confront the soldiers who were trying to create chaos at the polls. CGG developed as Sierra Leone's most prominent civil society group. But, the following year, RUF "rebels" and renegade soldiers took over the capital city and targeted leaders of the pro-democracy movement. Opala and his CGG colleagues were forced to leave the country.

== Public history from the Gullah region (1997 to 1999) ==
After returning to the US, Opala served for two years as the Scholar in Residence at Penn Center, the foremost Gullah community organization, based on St. Helena Island, South Carolina. Opala worked with Emory Campbell, Penn Center's director, and the US Park Service on the early planning stage of what ultimately became the Gullah-Geechee Cultural Heritage Corridor, a national heritage area covering the entire Gullah region, including the coastal plain and sea islands of South Carolina and Georgia, and adjoining parts of coastal North Carolina and Florida. The Corridor was established by Congress in 2006, and will ultimately embrace a wide range of public history initiatives to celebrate Gullah history and culture.

Opala organized workshops at Penn Center on the Sierra Leone-Gullah Connection for local teachers and cultural activists. He also lectured on the Gullahs' links to Sierra Leone at colleges, museums, and community centers in the Low Country. He brought several Sierra Leonean social activists to Penn Center, as well, who talked about their country's civil war and encouraged the Gullahs, as U.S. citizens, to speak out on behalf of their African cousins. Later, he helped arrange for Gullah families on St. Helena Island to care for the children of Sierra Leonean war refugees granted asylum in the U.S. while their parents settled their affairs in their new home. Thus, a relationship that had been merely historical was now becoming a reality in the world today.

Opala also helped organize several reunions between the Gullahs and their Black Seminole cousins in Oklahoma, Texas, and Northern Mexico. The Black Seminoles are the descendants of Gullah slaves who escaped into Spanish Florida in the 1700s, where they allied with the Seminole Indians. After the Second Seminole War in the 1830s, the Black Seminoles were removed to Indian Territory (now Oklahoma). Some later migrated to Texas and Northern Mexico, where their descendants still retain Gullah language and customs to the present day. Opala organized a symposium at Penn Center that brought Black Seminole leaders to the Gullah region for the first time, and he helped organize return visits by Gullah leaders to Black Seminole communities in Oklahoma and Texas. Opala later submitted a report to the US Park Service suggesting ways to incorporate Bunce Island and Black Seminole historic sites into the Gullah-Geechee Corridor in the future.

== Public history from the United States (1999 to 2010) ==
Opala taught at James Madison University (JMU) in Virginia from 1999 to 2010, using his academic position, whenever possible, to advance his "Gullah Connection" work. In 2003, he and his students organized a "Gullah Film Festival" at the Smithsonian's National Museum of Natural History. In 2004 he was a fellow at Yale University's Gilder Lehrman Center for the Study of Slavery, Resistance, and Abolition (GLC). Working with GLC, he organized the "National Summit on Bunce Island" at George Washington University's Elliott School of International Affairs in Washington, DC. The Summit brought together State Department, Smithsonian and National Park Service officials; Congressional staff; and Sierra Leone's Foreign Minister and Ambassador to the U.S. for an all-day briefing on Bunce Island's importance for both nations. The following year, Opala was a fellow at the Max Planck Institute for Social Anthropology in Germany, where he shared his work with international scholars.

Opala organized Priscilla's Homecoming to Sierra Leone in 2005, and the following year, curated an exhibit, called "Finding Priscilla's Children," at the New-York Historical Society that later traveled to museums in South Carolina. Priscilla's Homecoming was led by an African American woman whose family can trace their ancestry to an enslaved child, later called "Priscilla," who was taken from Sierra Leone to South Carolina in the year 1756, using a uniquely unbroken chain of documents (see: "Gullah Homecomings" below). Opala worked with the Africana Heritage Project at the University of South Florida that produced an online database that will enable thousands of other African Americans to link their own family histories to Priscilla.

In 2007, Opala helped establish the "Bunce Island Coalition (US)" at a meeting in Washington, DC attended by two former U.S. Ambassadors to Sierra Leone, prominent Sierra Leoneans living in the US, Gullah community leaders, and former Peace Corps volunteers. BIC (US) was established as a non-profit group to raise funds to preserve Bunce Island through a publicity campaign. The following year, Opala and his JMU students developed an exhibit on Bunce Island that went to universities, museums, and libraries all across the US, including the Field Museum of Natural History in Chicago. The exhibit is now on permanent display in the Sierra Leone National Museum. In 2010, a wealthy private donor pledged $5 million for the project, and Opala went to Sierra Leone right away to act as the project coordinator. Sierra Leone's President Ernest Bai Koroma agreed to a televised meeting with the project team in November 2010 to signal his support.

== Sierra Leone-Gullah Connection ==
The Gullahs live in the Low Country region of South Carolina and Georgia on the coastal plain and the long chain of Sea Islands that runs parallel to the coast. They are well known for having preserved more of their African cultural heritage than any other black community in the US, including a creole language that contains strong African influences. They also have a cuisine, storytelling, music, religious beliefs, spiritual practices, herbal medicines, handicrafts, etc. that exhibit strong African influences.

The Gullahs' history can be understood in large measure through one important factor — rice farming. Rice was the staple crop in South Carolina and Georgia in the colonial period, and Low Country planters preferred African captives from what they called the "Rice Coast" because of their skill at cultivating that difficult crop. By "Rice Coast," Low Country planters meant the traditional rice-growing region of West Africa that extended about 700 miles from what are now Senegal, Gambia and Guinea Bissau in the north down to Guinea, Sierra Leone and Liberia in the south. African farmers had been cultivating rice in that region for centuries, and had developed methods to grow that crop in every new environment they pioneered long before European contact. Peter Wood and other scholars have shown that Rice Coast Africans contributed greatly to the success of the rice industry in early South Carolina and Georgia.

Slave auction ads of the period in the Charleston and Savannah newspapers often mentioned the origin of the slaves in areas where Africans were known to cultivate rice: the "Rice Coast," "Gambia," "Seralion," and "Windward Coast." Some ads stated that the enslaved Africans were "well acquainted with the culture of rice," and some referred specifically to "Bance Island."

Peter Wood has pointed to the Rice Coast region, in general, as important for Gullah origins, while Daniel Littlefield has pointed to influences from the Senegambia region on the north end of the Rice Coast. But Opala has long argued that while the Gullahs have links to the Rice Coast as a whole, their connection to Sierra Leone is uniquely strong. He points out that Bunce Island was the largest British slaving operation in the Rice Coast area, and that Africans were not just taken from Sierra Leone to the Gullah region, some Gullahs also returned to Sierra Leone after a period of time, thereby giving rise to influences in both directions.

== Two-way connection ==
Some free Gullah people, known as "Black Loyalists," migrated to Sierra Leone after American Independence. They were originally slaves on South Carolina and Georgia plantations who escaped to the British lines during the American Revolutionary War. The British promised them freedom in return for military service, but after they lost the war, the British resettled them in Nova Scotia, Canada. Later, British philanthropists established a colony for freed slaves in Sierra Leone, and arranged transportation for nearly 1,200 Black Loyalists from Canada to Sierra Leone in 1792.

Opala maintains that about a quarter of the Black Loyalists (or "Nova Scotians" as they were called in Sierra Leone today) were originally Gullahs from South Carolina and Georgia. Some Gullahs also migrated directly from the United States to Sierra Leone in the early 1800s, including Edward Jones, a free black man from South Carolina. Jones became the first principal of Sierra Leone's Fourah Bay College.

This two-way connection means that many Sierra Leoneans have family ties to the Gullahs in South Carolina and Georgia. People from Sierra Leone's indigenous tribes — the Mende, Temne, Limba, etc. — were transported as slaves to the rice plantations in the Low Country. But some of the Nova Scotian migrants who went to Sierra Leone later on were Gullahs, and some had actually been born in Sierra Leone. The descendants of these migrants, who live in Freetown, the capital city, are known as the Creoles (or Krios). So, both Sierra Leone's indigenous peoples and the Krios can claim family ties to the Gullahs.

In 2011, Kevin Lowther, another former Peace Corps Volunteer who served in Sierra Leone, published a groundbreaking biography of John Kizell, a man of the Sherbro tribe of Sierra Leone who was transported to slavery in South Carolina. Kizell completed the full circle, escaping slavery in Charleston, serving with the British Army during the Revolutionary War, taking part in the evacuation of black troops to Nova Scotia, and then returning to Sierra Leone with the "Nova Scotian" settlers in 1792. Opala's foreword to the book calls attention to this two-way connection between Sierra Leoneans and Gullahs exemplified by Kizell's long and eventful life.

== Three Gullah Homecomings ==
Opala is best known for the series of "homecomings" he organized, starting in 1988 with a visit by Sierra Leone's President Joseph Saidu Momoh to the Gullah community on St. Helena Island, South Carolina. National Public Radio called that event the "Gullah Reunion." He later organized three homecoming visits for Gullahs returning to Sierra Leone, each based on new and more specific information Opala and other scholars had discovered on the links between Sierra Leoneans and the Gullahs. He organized these events in collaboration with the Sierra Leone Government, the U.S. Embassy in Sierra Leone, and Gullah community leaders in the U.S. He also helped produce the documentary films that chronicle the first two homecomings: Family Across the Sea (1991) and The Language You Cry In (1998). These videos generated a good deal of public discussion in both countries on family lost in the slave trade; and after seeing them, some Sierra Leoneans and African Americans traveled across the Atlantic on their own to renew lost family ties. These documentaries also highlight the role of Bunce Island in the slave trade links between Sierra Leone and the US.

Gullah Homecoming (1989) -- The first homecoming was led by Emory Campbell, Director of Penn Center, the foremost Gullah community organization, and it included Gullah community leaders and cultural activists. The Gullahs had learned of Opala's research on the slave trade links between Sierra Leone and South Carolina and Georgia, and they wanted to see Sierra Leone for themselves. The visitors were hosted by Sierra Leone's president on a state visit; they toured traditional African rice fields; and they paid a poignant visit to Bunce Island. The documentary Family Across the Sea — made by South Carolina Public Television — documents this historic homecoming and President Momoh's groundbreaking visit to South Carolina the year before.

Moran Family Homecoming (1997) -- Opala and ethnomusicologist Cynthia Schmidt located a Gullah family in coastal Georgia that has preserved a song in the Mende language of Sierra Leone for over 200 years. The 5-line song, an ancient funeral hymn, is likely the longest text in an African language known to have been preserved by a black family in the US. The song was first recorded by African American linguist Lorenzo Dow Turner in 1931. Opala and Schmidt found that the Georgia family still remembered the song when they met them in 1990; and later, working with Sierra Leonean linguist Tazieff Koroma, they found a Mende woman living in a remote rural area of southern Sierra Leone whose family has preserved a similar song. The melodies of the songs are different, but the lyrics are very similar; and the Mende woman sang along with Turner's original recording the moment she heard it. Opala worked with the Sierra Leone Government to arrange the Moran family's homecoming, and helped produce the documentary film The Language You Cry In that chronicles this remarkable story.

Priscilla's Homecoming (2005) -- Opala organized a homecoming for Thomalind Polite, a young Gullah woman whose family is linked to Sierra Leone by an unbroken 250-year document trail. Records show that Polite is the direct descendant of a 10-year-old enslaved girl, later called "Priscilla", who was taken from Sierra Leone to Charleston, South Carolina in 1756. Polite's family history was first researched by writer Edward Ball, and included in his prize-winning book Slaves in the Family (1998). Ball documented the family's history through detailed plantation records that reveal Priscilla's descendants in America for eight generations. Opala completed the story when he found the records of the slave ship Hare, that brought Priscilla from Sierra Leone to Charleston, and the slave auction accounts that record her sale to a South Carolina rice planter. Opala developed a website on "Priscilla's Homecoming", maintained by Yale University. He also curated an exhibit at the New-York Historical Society called, Finding Priscilla's Children: The Roots and Branches of Slavery (2006).

== Bunce Island preservation project (2010 to 2013) ==
In 2010, Opala announced the start of a $5 million project to preserve Bunce Island. He was then director of a non-profit called the Bunce Island Coalition (US), whose goal is to halt the erosion that threatens the island, stabilize the ruins, and construct a modern historic park. His group also wants to build a museum in Freetown devoted to Bunce Island's history and its impact in both Sierra Leone and the Americas. The museum will feature Sierra Leone's connections to the Gullahs and other African diaspora communities. After signing a memorandum of understanding with the Sierra Leone Government in July 2010, the Coalition began overseeing a series of scientific studies leading to a full-blown preservation project. Two highly qualified experts joined the project — archaeologist Christopher DeCorse of Syracuse University, known for his seminal research on Ghana's Elmina Castle and Michael Schuller, president of a US-based engineering firm that carries out historic preservation projects all over the world. The Bunce Island project quickly gained international attention, and in October 2011 Opala guided Britain's Princess Anne through the ruins. In 2013, Opala handed the project over to his Sierra Leonean colleagues in the Bunce Island Coalition, though he continues to serve as the group's historical adviser.

Opala and computer artist Gary Chatelain of James Madison University are now working on a 3-D computer model of Bunce Island showing how the castle appeared in the year 1805. African American TV actor Isaiah Washington, who traced his ancestors to Sierra Leone through a DNA test, donated $25,000 to the project in 2007. Opala and Chatelain's computer model will be used to explain the castle to visitors at both the museum and the site itself. The computer model is also featured in a traveling exhibit on Bunce Island that Opala created. The exhibit has gone to colleges and museums in the U.S. and Canada, and to the Sierra Leone National Museum during that country's 50th anniversary of Independence celebrations in 2011.

== Popular and scholarly impact ==
The homecomings Opala organized focused national attention on the Gullah Connection in Sierra Leone, and the people of that country responded with enthusiasm. When the first Gullah group made a pilgrimage to Bunce Island in 1989, hundreds of people came in boats and canoes to witness the historic occasion. Today, the "Gullah Connection" is an "evergreen" story in the Sierra Leone media, and local newspapers frequently carry stories on the Gullah and their African roots that appear in the American papers. Most Sierra Leoneans are now aware of their historical links to the Gullahs. Sierra Leone's high school history textbook covers the Gullah Connection, and several local civic groups are dedicated to nurturing their country's family ties to the Gullahs.

The "Gullah homecomings" also generated extensive publicity in South Carolina and Georgia. The documentary films based on those events have been broadcast repeatedly on local TV and shown in schools and colleges in those states, and many Gullahs have now visited Sierra Leone. In 1995 the Coastal Georgia Historical Society produced a traveling exhibit, called "Trans-Atlantic Linkage: The Gullah/Geechee-Sierra Leone Connection," in partnership with the Sierra Leone National Museum. During Sierra Leone's civil war, Gullah civic leaders lobbied the U.S. Congress, asking for help for their "ancestral homeland". Sierra Leonean immigrants in the U.S. have also taken a strong interest in the Gullah Connection, forming an organization called the "Sierra Leone-Gullah Heritage Association" to nurture their family ties to the Gullahs. Sierra Leoneans and Gullahs now come together frequently at cultural festivals in the Low Country.

African Americans, in general, have taken a good deal of interest in the Mende song from Sierra Leone preserved by the Gullah family in coastal Georgia. The Smithsonian's Anacostia Museum produced an exhibit on Lorenzo Dow Turner in 2010 that included a section on the Mende song. An inspirational book, called the African American Book of Values, features the story of the ancient song. Musicians in Charleston created a jazz version of the Mende song, playing it in local concerts. And a musical play, called Black Pearl Sings! based partly on the documentary The Language You Cry In—and including a dramatic performance of the Mende song at the end of the play—has met with enthusiastic audiences in repertory theaters all across the country.

But Opala's most enduring contribution is, no doubt, his discovery of Bunce Island's historical importance for the United States, and his decades of research and public history work to promote popular understanding of that site. Bunce Island will likely become a major destination for African American heritage tourism in the coming years due largely to his efforts. But Opala has also encouraged other scholars to take interest in Bunce Island, and more and more have turned their attention to that site. Professor Henry Louis Gates, the well-known authority on African American studies, recently featured Bunce Island in his new TV documentary on the history of African Americans, broadcast on PBS. Gates also featured in the same video the story of "Priscilla," the enslaved child taken from Sierra Leone to South Carolina in 1756. Opala's claim that Bunce Island has special importance for the United States appears to be gradually gaining acceptance.

== Honors ==
- Sierra Leone: Order of the Rokel (2012)

== External links (biography & awards) ==
- "Professor Joseph Opala Honored" Sierra Leone's 2012 National Honors ceremony, Cocorioko May 31, 2012
- "Citation" from Sierra Leone's president African Diaspora Tourism website
- Opala granted Sierra Leone citizenship Sierra Leone Express Media, Dec. 13, 2013
- Opala Inducted into the 1862 Circle The Island News, May 9, 2013
- "Penn Center Honors Local, Cultural Leaders" Beaufort Gazette, May 18, 2013
- "Former JMU Prof Continues Groundbreaking Research into Trans-Atlantic Slave Trade" Old South High website
- , James Madison University (scroll down)
- , Hartford Courant

== External links (written sources) ==
- The Gullah: Rice, Slavery and the Sierra Leone--American Connection, Gilder Lehrman Center, Yale University
- The Language You Cry In—Summary description, California Newsreel
- —Summary description, Inko Productions
- "Priscilla: The Story of an African Slave", BBC News, New York, 23 November 2005
- "Priscilla's Homecoming" Website, Gilder Lehrman Center, Yale University
- "Priscilla's Homecoming" USF Africana Heritage Project
- , Providence Journal
- Bunce Island preservation project, Christian Science Monitor
- "Sierra Leone Moves into Slave Tourism" BBC News, June 28, 2012

== External links (video & audio) ==
- Family Across the Sea —Folkstreams Full-length video online
- The Language You Cry In —Folkstreams Full-length video online
- Radio Interview on Priscilla's Homecoming With Good Reason October 14, 2006
- "US Historian Receives the Order of the Rokel" on YouTube broadcast by SLBC TV, April 27, 2012
- Tour of Bunce Island for MSNBC MSNBC's Rock Center, broadcast February 15, 2012
- Tour of Bunce Island for CNN CNN's Inside Africa, "Slave Trade Ghost Town," May 16, 2013 (see text and video)
