= Ignatius Ferreira =

Colonel Ignatius Ferreira
- Born: Ignatius Philip Ferreira; 5 July 1840; Grahamstown, Cape Colony, South Africa
- Died: 13 May 1921 (aged 80); Kranspoort, Louis Trichardt district, Northern Transvaal
- Occupation(s): Soldier, fortune hunter, miner and farmer
- Spouse: Baltrina Erasmus

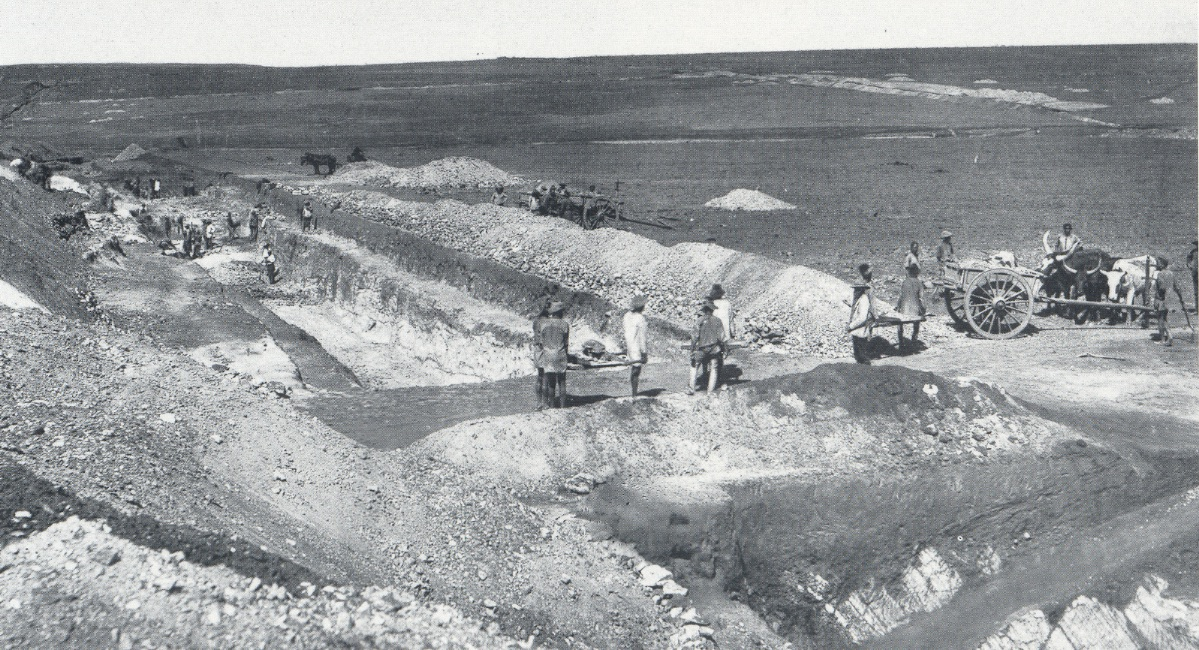
Ferreira's Gold Mine in 1886. The mine was named after Colonel Ignatius Ferreira who was a founder of Johannesburg. The mine is an extension of the Main Reef.

Colonel Ignatius Philip Ferreira, CMG DSO (5 July 1840, Grahamstown, Cape Colony – 13 May 1921, Kranspoort, Louis Trichardt district, Transvaal) was a South African soldier, fortune hunter, miner and farmer of Portuguese descent. He is more commonly known for having the earliest gold mining camp on the Witwatersrand named after him called Ferreirastown (Ferreirasdorp), which was on the edge of the farm Randjeeslagte soon to be proclaimed as the site of a new town called Johannesburg.

== Early life ==
He was born in Grahamstown in 1840 to father Ignatius Ferreira and mother Hendrika Pohl. He was educated at the Wesleyan Grammar School in Grahamstown. He would later marry Baltrina Erasmus, in 1862, also known as Neef Naas. He would take up farming before moving to Kimberley where he attempted to prospect unsuccessfully for diamonds but met Sam Wemmer. When Sam Wemmer moved to Middlesburg in the Transvaal to farm, Ferreira soon followed and resumed farming. He would later attempt to prospect for gold in Pilgrim's Rest, Kaapsche Hoop and in Barberton.

== Military career ==
His military career started in the Cape Colony as a trooper in the Cape Mounted Police, training under Sir Walter Currie. While living in the Transvaal, he became a Field Cornet under Schalk Burger and served in the first war against the Secocoeni in 1876. In 1877, Ferreira raised a unit called Ferreira's Horse for the first time. Early in 1879, Ferreira and his new unit took part with other British forces in the Anglo-Zulu War in Zululand against the Zulu leader King Cetshwayo. The unit was said to consist of 115 men serving with the colonial cavalry under Colonel Redvers Henry Buller. Later in the same year on 28 November 1879, Ferreira took part in the Sekhukhune Campaign in the North-eastern Transvaal, where he again commanded the Ferreira's Horse. The British and Native force under the command of Colonel Baker Russell would attack the stronghold of the Pedi tribes leader, King Sekukune in the Sekhukhuneland. The tribe, having taken refuge in a mountain stronghold, was assaulted by Ferreira and the British and native forces over several days before the tribal king surrendered on 2 Dec 1879 to him. For his effort in the campaign he was appointed Companion of Most Distinguished Order of Saint Michael and Saint George (CMG). In late 1880s, Ferreira and his horseman would take part in the Basuto War. It was raised for a third time outside Pretoria, also known as the Transvaal Horse, and would assist the Cape Colony to put down the Basuto rebels and took with it two 9-pounder field guns. It was disbanded in 1881 and at that time had a strength of 450 men.

== Witwatersrand ==
Ferreira arrived on the Witwatersrand in June 1886, and erected a reed hut on land on the farm Turffontein close to where the Johannesburg Magistrate's Court presently resides. Soon potential gold prospectors arrived and their tents, wagons, reed huts and wood-iron building were gathered around Ferreira's position and he would lay out what came to be called Ferreira's Camp, in a military fashion with tents lined up and aligned the roadways. On 24 July 1886, George Harrison sent a letter, a sworn declaration, to the government in Pretoria, that he had found payable gold on Gert C. Oosthuizen's farm Langlaagte. Ferreira and 72 other prospectors, after viewing Harrison's outcrop, realized the reef lay on line east to west, petitioned the government on 26 July 1886 to have area proclaimed as a goldfield. During June and July, he would peg claims and obtained mining leases. The proclamation of the goldfields occurred on 9 September.

At Ferreira's Camp, he unofficially maintained law and order. According to the South African Republic Gold Law, the Mine Commissioner of the proclaimed goldfield could make arrangements for a Diggers Committee. This committee would develop the regulations concerning water rights, public safety, health and other issues in conjunction with the Mine Commissioner. A notice was placed on 19 October 1886, calling for candidates to stand for election on 8 November. Twenty-five men put their names forward for the nine positions, with Ferreira obtaining the most votes and gain a position on Digger's Committee. Two mines, the Ferreira Gold Mining Company and Ferreira Deep, established later on claims he owned and had sold, would be named after the man who played a role in the success of the mining camp at Johannesburg.

== Death ==
After playing an undistinguished role during the Second Boer War, he would settle on the farm Kranspoort, 56 km west of the town of Louis Trichardt, Northern Transvaal and died there in May 1921.
