= John M. Walker Jr. =

American judge (born 1940)

John Walker
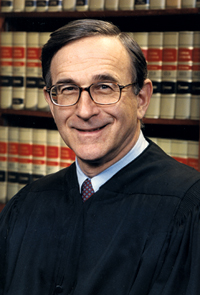

Senior Judge of the United States Court of Appeals for the Second Circuit
- Incumbent
- Assumed office September 30, 2006

Chief Judge of the United States Court of Appeals for the Second Circuit
- In office September 30, 2000 – September 30, 2006
- Preceded by: Ralph K. Winter Jr.
- Succeeded by: Dennis Jacobs

Judge of the United States Court of Appeals for the Second Circuit
- In office November 27, 1989 – September 30, 2006
- Appointed by: George H. W. Bush
- Preceded by: Irving Kaufman
- Succeeded by: Debra Ann Livingston

Judge of the United States District Court for the Southern District of New York
- In office July 22, 1985 – December 19, 1989
- Appointed by: Ronald Reagan
- Preceded by: Morris E. Lasker
- Succeeded by: Sonia Sotomayor

Personal details
- Born: John Mercer Walker Jr. December 26, 1940 (age 85) New York City, New York, U.S.
- Relatives: John M. Walker (father); See Bush-Walker family
- Education: Yale University (BA); University of Michigan (JD)

John Mercer Walker Jr. (born December 26, 1940) is a senior United States circuit judge of the United States Court of Appeals for the Second Circuit. He served as chief judge from September 30, 2000, to September 30, 2006, when he assumed senior status. He was a United States district judge of the United States District Court for the Southern District of New York, appointed in 1985 by President Ronald Reagan before being elevated to the Second Circuit in 1989.

== Early life and education ==
Walker was born in New York City. He graduated from Phillips Exeter Academy in 1958 and received his Bachelor of Arts degree from Yale University in 1962, then received his Juris Doctor from the University of Michigan Law School in 1966.

Walker is married to Katharine K. Walker, has a daughter and three stepsons, and lives in Madison, Connecticut. He is the son of Dr. John M. Walker and Elsie Louise Mead. His uncle is George Herbert Walker Jr., co-founder of the New York Mets. He is a first cousin of United States President George H. W. Bush, the two having a grandfather in common, George Herbert Walker. His father's sister, Dorothy, was the mother of the 41st President. He is also a first cousin once removed, of President George W. Bush and his brother, former Governor of Florida Jeb Bush.

== Early career ==
Walker served in the Marine Corps Reserves from 1963 until 1968. From 1966 until 1968, he was State Counsel to the Republic of Botswana, sponsored by an Africa-Asia Public Service Fellowship, where he drafted a codification of tribal law and was the country's principal prosecutor in the regular (non-tribal) criminal courts.

Walker was in private practice in New York City from 1969 to 1970. From 1970 to 1975 he served as an Assistant United States Attorney in the Criminal Division in the United States Attorney's Office for the Southern District of New York, where he prosecuted drugs and business fraud cases. In 1975 he returned to private law practice with the New York firm of Carter, Ledyard & Milburn, where he was a partner in commercial litigation.

In 1981 Walker became Assistant Secretary of the Treasury, responsible for policy in law enforcement, regulatory, and trade matters, and with oversight of the Customs Service, Secret Service, Federal Law Enforcement Training Center, Bureau of Alcohol, Tobacco and Firearms, and the Office of Foreign Assets Control. As Assistant Secretary, he helped establish the Iran–United States Claims Tribunal and served as a U.S. representative to Interpol. He led the development of Treasury's drug interdiction and financial enforcement programs. He also oversaw the Treasury's review of Secret Service operations following the attempt to assassinate President Ronald Reagan. Among the shortcomings of the Secret Service that the review identified and remedied were inadequate reserve personnel and the use of unencrypted radio communications. For his Treasury service, Walker received the Alexander Hamilton Award, Treasury's highest award. His work caught the attention of New York Senator Alphonse D'Amato who supported him for the position of district judge.

== Federal judicial service ==
=== District court service ===
Walker was nominated by President Ronald Reagan on June 25, 1985, to a seat on the United States District Court for the Southern District of New York vacated by Judge Morris E. Lasker. He was confirmed by the United States Senate on July 19, 1985, and received commission on July 22, 1985. His service terminated on December 19, 1989, due to elevation to the court of appeals. He was succeeded by Judge Sonia Sotomayor. As a district judge, Walker presided over a variety of civil and criminal proceedings, including notably the 1989 tax fraud trial of billionaire hotel magnate Leona Helmsley, whom he sentenced to four years in jail.

=== Court of appeals service ===
Walker was nominated by President George H. W. Bush on September 21, 1989, to a seat on the United States Court of Appeals for the Second Circuit vacated by Judge Irving Kaufman. He was confirmed by the Senate on November 22, 1989, and received his commission on November 27, 1989. He served as Chief Judge from September 30, 2000 to September 30, 2006. He assumed senior status on September 30, 2006. He was succeeded by Judge Debra Ann Livingston.

Walker was awarded the Learned Hand Medal for "excellence in Federal Jurisprudence" by the Federal Bar Council and in 2006 the Robert L. Haig Award for "distinguished public service" by the New York State Bar Association, and the J. Edward Lumbard Award for "outstanding service" by the Southern District of New York U.S. Attorney's Office.

=== Judicial administration ===
Walker has served as Special Counsel to the U.S. Administrative Conference (1987–1992) and president of the Federal Judges' Association (1993–1995). As chief judge, Walker was engaged with all three levels of federal court administration. He led the Court of Appeals, chaired the Second Circuit Judicial Council with responsibility for all of the courts within the Second Circuit (consisting of the states of Connecticut, New York, and Vermont), and on the national level was a member of the Judicial Conference of the United States, chaired by the Chief Justice of the United States (2000–2006). He was also selected by Chief Justice William Rehnquist to be a member of the Conference's Executive Committee (2003–2006) and its Budget Committee (1990–1999). He was selected by Chief Justice John G. Roberts Jr. to be a member of its Committee on International Judicial Relations (2006–2012), and to be the Chair of the Conference's Committee on Judicial Conduct and Disability (2009–2013). As Chief Judge of the Second Circuit, Walker managed the dislocations from the courthouse at 40 Foley Square in lower Manhattan caused by the terrorist attacks of 9/11/2001, oversaw the establishment by Judge Jon O. Newman of a separate calendar for a sudden crush of 5,000 immigration appeals in 2005, and obtained funding for the total renovation of the Thurgood Marshall Courthouse at 40 Foley Square which was completed under the supervision of Chief Judge Walker and his successor, Chief Judge Dennis Jacobs.

=== Court cases ===
Walker has authored several hundred decisions in various areas of federal law including influential precedents in the areas of constitutional law, criminal law, criminal and civil procedure, securities law, bankruptcy law, intellectual property law, and international law, including the following selected appeals.

==== Constitutional law ====
- National Abortion Federation v. Gonzales, 437 F.3d 278, 296 (2d Cir. 2006) (Walker, C.J., concurring). In a concurring opinion, Walker criticized the evidentiary standard adopted by the Supreme Court in Stenberg v. Carhart, 530 U.S. 914 (2000), which allowed facial challenges against abortion laws to succeed with only speculative showings that the challenged regulations might work an unconstitutional result. This standard, Walker observed, was "both unclear and difficult" for lower courts "to apply with any certainty" and left legislatures without sufficient constitutional guidance on how challenges could be made against their enactments. Justice Anthony Kennedy cited Walker's reasoning approvingly in Gonzales v. Carhart, 550 U.S. 124 (2007), which distinguished Stenberg and upheld the constitutionality of the federal partial-birth abortion statute enacted by Congress in 2003.
- Rweyemamu v. Cote, 520 F.3d 198 (2d Cir. 2008), formally adopting the ministerial exception to Title VII of the Civil Rights Act in the Second Circuit. Rweyemamu was cited favorably by Chief Justice John Roberts in the unanimous opinion of the U.S. Supreme Court in Hosanna-Tabor Evangelical Lutheran Church and School v. Equal Employment Opportunity Commission, 565 U.S. 171 (2012).

==== Civil procedure ====
- Sumitomo Copper Litigation v. Credit Lyonnais Rouse, Ltd., 262 F.3d 134 (2d Cir. 2001), setting forth the basis for interlocutory appeal of a district court's certification of a class action lawsuit.

==== Securities ====
- Novak v. Kasaks, 216 F.3d 300 (2d Cir. 2000), interpreting the pleading standard for securities fraud actions set forth under the Private Securities Litigation Reform Act of 1995.
- SEC v. Obus, 693 F.3d 276 (2d Cir. 2012), applying and clarifying the misappropriation theory for insider trading liability.

==== Intellectual property ====
- Computer Associates Int. Inc. v. Altai Inc., 982 F.2d 693 (2d Cir. 1992), a leading decision on how to establish copyright infringement for software
- Castle Rock Entertainment, Inc. v. Carol Publishing Group, 150 F.3d 132 (2d Cir. 1998), the "Seinfeld Aptitude Test" case, a ruling on the determination of substantial similarity of works.
- NXIVM Corp. v. The Ross Institute, 364 F.3d 471 (2d Cir. 2004), deciding whether a fair use defense was available when copyrighted materials were obtained in bad faith.
- Cartoon Network, LP v. CSC Holdings, Inc., 536 F.3d 121 (2d Cir. 2008), regarding the use of digital video recorders to time shift the playback of copyright video content.
- 1-800 Contacts, Inc. v. WhenU.com, Inc., 414 F.3d 400 (2d Cir. 2005), regarding trademark infringement in online pop-up advertisements.

== Judicial philosophy ==
Walker is a strong advocate of judicial independence for both courts in the United States and in other countries. He has condemned the growing politicization of the judicial nomination and confirmation process for federal judges. The "political theater" that judicial nominees are subjected to in the Senate, he writes, "politicizes the judiciary, misrepresents the judiciary's role in our democracy, demeans highly qualified nominees, and unjustifiably delays or jettisons confirmations." An independent judge, in his view, is one who faithfully applies existing law to the facts of the case at hand, giving due respect to precedent, and resists the temptation to effectively rewrite legislative enactments. The independent judge "must remain detached and impartial -- and free not merely from personal or financial interests" but also free of "any responsibility to party or social faction" and "must not be concerned with whether an outcome will incur public approbation or wrath."

== Teaching and scholarship ==
Since 2000, Walker has been a Lecturer in Law at Yale Law School, where he has taught constitutional litigation with fellow Second Circuit judges Guido Calabresi and Susan L. Carney and with district judges Mark Kravitz and Jeffrey Meyer.

From 1996 to 2000, Walker was an adjunct professor at New York University School of Law and a member of NYU's Institute of Judicial Administration and Appellate Judges Seminar. He has also served on the Board of the U.S. Association of Constitutional Law since 1997 and the CEELI Institute in Prague since 2006.

== Rule of law initiatives ==
Walker is actively involved in initiatives to promote the rule of law, strengthen judiciaries and foster cooperation among judges around the world, especially in Eastern and Central Europe, China and the Middle East. He was a member of the U.S. delegation to the G8 Experts Conference on the Rule of Law in Berlin in 2007.

=== Central and Eastern Europe ===
Walker has worked across Central and Eastern Europe to promote the development of judicial institutions in individual countries and to foster collaboration among judiciaries across the region and the United States. In 2011, he was instrumental in organizing the first Conference of the Chief Justices of Central and Eastern Europe, hosted by the CEELI Institute in Prague, which was attended by the chief justices, presidents and high officers of the supreme courts that region of the world. Chief Justice of the United States John G. Roberts, Jr. delivered the opening remarks and participated in the first conference. The Conference, now an ongoing institution that meets annually in a different member country, provides a unique forum for the heads of judiciaries of 24 former communist countries to share their experiences, discuss problems and offer solutions, while developing ongoing personal relationships.

The Chief Justices Conference arose out of CEELI's Judicial Integrity Round Tables. In 2006, while on a trip to Hungary, Walker saw a need for closer communication among the chief justices of Central and Eastern European countries. He then led the roundtable discussions on judicial integrity among the heads of the Supreme Court in the region at the CEELI Institute in Prague in 2007 and 2010. At the 2010 roundtable, the participants expressed a desire to hold regular conferences on an ongoing basis. After the first Chief Justices Conference in 2011, Walker has represented the Ceeli Institute and remained an advisor to the Conference. He helped plan and participated in subsequent Chief Justice Conferences hosted in Albania (2012), Montenegro (2013), Georgia (2014), Croatia (2015), Serbia (2016), Hungary (2017), Lithuania (2018) and Slovakia (2019). Since 2013, the Russian Federation has actively participated in the work of the Conference.

Walker began working on issues of legal reform and judicial administration in Eastern Europe in 2004 when Chief Justice of Albania Thimio Kondi sought assistance with the administration of the Albanian judiciary. Walker made multiple trips to Albania to assist with the establishment of a judicial conference modeled upon that of the U.S. federal judiciary and to teach judicial ethics. He has discussed legal reform issues with Presidents Alfred Moisiu and Bamir Topi and prime ministers Fatos Nano and Sali Berisha. He worked with Kondi's successor, Chief Justice Shpresa Beçaj, to host the second Chief Justices Conference in Tirana in 2012. President Moisiu awarded Judge Walker the "Medal of Special Merit" for his work in Albania.

Elsewhere in Eastern Europe, Walker has discussed law reform issues with leaders in various countries where he has also given remarks and met with law school faculty and students, bar associations and judges. In 2008 he helped organize a conference on rule of law and law school accreditation in Georgia where he discussed rule of law issues with President Mikheil Saakashvili, having worked on law reform the previous year with Chief Justice of the Georgian Supreme Court Konstantin Kublashvili.

=== China ===
Since 1986, Walker has been active in rule of law programs and exchanges with China. He has participated in exchanges with Chinese judges in Beijing, Shanghai, Shenyang, Xiamen and Haikou. He has lectured or spoken on U.S. law and rule of law topics in Beijing at the National Judges College, National Prosecutors College, Peking University, Renmin University, China University of Political Science and Law, and Beijing Normal University; in Shanghai at Fudan University, East China University of Political Science and Law and at the joint China program of Zhejiang University Guanghua Law School and Thomas Jefferson Law School in Hangzhou.

He has conferred on issues of legal reform with Chinese officials including President of the Supreme People's Court (SPC) Xiao Yang, SPC vice president Wan Exiang, Procurator-General of the Supreme People's Procuratorate Cao Jianming, vice chairman of the Chinese People's Political Consultative Conference Huang Mengfu, and Director of the State Council Information Office Wang Chen. In 2002, he helped arrange with U.S. Supreme Court Justice Sandra Day O'Connor a judicial delegation to meet in Beijing with the Supreme People's Court to discuss problems of local protectionism by courts and accompanied Justice O'Connor to a meeting with President of China Jiang Zemin in Zhongnanhai. In 2009, working with China law expert professor Jerome Cohen and other American scholars and judges, Walker led the American delegation at the inaugural Sino-American Dialogue on the Rule of Law and Human Rights, a Track II dialogue co-sponsored by the National Committee on U.S.-China Relations and the China Foundation for Human Rights Development, in Nantong and thereafter in other venues. More recently, working with experts at Yale and Stanford and with the Supreme People's Court, he has participated in workshops in China and submitted papers to support a system of precedent in China, known as the "Guiding Cases System," under the auspices of the Supreme People's Court.

Elsewhere in Asia, Walker participated in rule of law programs in 2010 in Thailand and in 2012 in South Korea where he met with the Chief Justices of the Supreme Court and Constitutional Court and with judges and law students and faculty.

=== Middle East ===
Walker spoke at "Arab Judicial Forum 2003: Judicial Systems in the 21st Century," a conference on judicial reform in the Middle East that was held in Bahrain in 2003 and attended by 17 countries, and the "Regional Forum on the Role of Civil Society in Promoting the Rule of Law in the Arab Region" held in Jordan in 2008. He has also been engaged with training programs for Iraqi officials and judges held in Iraq, Jordan and Bahrain. He has conferred with the Chief Justice of the Supreme Court of Iraq, Medhat al-Mahmoud, on issues relating to the rule of law and human rights.

== Miscellaneous ==
=== Fatal traffic accident ===
On the evening of October 17, 2006, while driving home, Walker's Ford Escape automobile struck a police officer, Daniel Picagli, who was directing traffic in a rainstorm at a road construction site for AT&T in New Haven, Connecticut. There were no construction signs or traffic cones marking off the site. Picagli died four days later on October 21, 2006. "He had been wearing a black raincoat and a reflective vest". Police Chief Francisco Ortiz said the "officers did not feel it was necessary to test Walker for drugs or alcohol". Walker stopped immediately, and New Haven police have said the cause was not related to drugs or alcohol. A police investigation reported that Walker "was traveling at a slow speed through the dark and rainy construction site." The prosecutor declined to press charges, saying nothing indicated "intentional, negligent or reckless conduct" by Walker.

== Selected writings ==
- John M. Walker Jr., Qihu v. Tencent, the Chinese Supreme People's Court Offers Antitrust Insight for the Digital Age. Commentary on Guiding Case No. 78 for China Guiding Cases Project, Stanford Law School, https://cgc.law.stanford.edu/, posted in Chinese to assist Chinese judges and lawyers on technology related antitrust principles (2017).
- John M. Walker Jr., The Role of Precedent in the United States, China Guiding Cases Project, Stanford Law School, https://cgc.law.stanford.edu/commentaries.15-John-Walker, posted in Chinese to assist training of Chinese judges and lawyers on use of precedent (2016).
- John M. Walker Jr., Daniel J.T. Schuker, Strengthening Judicial Independence in the New Constitutional Democracies of Central and Eastern Europe, 37 Yale J. Int'l L. Online 43 (2012).
- John M. Walker Jr., Advancing the Rule of Law Abroad, 43 Int'l Law 61 (2009).
- John M. Walker Jr., Politics and the Confirmation Process: Thoughts on the Roberts and Alito Hearings, in Bench Press: The Collision of Courts, Politics, and the Media (Keith J. Bybee ed. 2007)
- John M. Walker Jr., Politics and the Confirmation Process: The Importance of Congressional Restraint in Safeguarding Judicial Independence, 55 Syracuse L. Rev. 1 (2004).
- John M. Walker Jr., An Outline of American Criminal Procedure, Investigation, Trial and Judicial Review, Lecture delivered at the Chinese University of Politics and Law, Beijing, China (September 2002).
- John M. Walker Jr., A Liberty of Restraint, Remarks at the Law Day Dinner, May 1, 2002, 76 St. John's L. Rev. 595 (2002).
- John M. Walker Jr., Judicial Tendencies in Statutory Interpretation, 58 N.Y.U. Ann. Surv. Am. L. 203 (2001).
- John M. Walker Jr., Foreword, Second Circuit Survey, 21 Quinnipiac L. Rev. 1 (Summer 2001).
- Andreas F. Lowenfeld, Lawrence W. Newman, John M. Walker Jr., Revolutionary Days: The Iran Hostage Crisis and the Hague Claims Tribunal, A Look Back, Juris Publishing, Inc. (1999).
- John M. Walker Jr., Comments on Professionalism, 2 J. Inst. for Study Legal Ethics 111 (1999).
- John M. Walker Jr., Harmless Error Review in the Second Circuit, 63 Brook. L. Rev. 395 (1997).
- John M. Walker Jr., Domestic Adjudication of International Human Rights Violations Under the Alien Tort Statute, 41 St. Louis U. L.J. 539 (1997).
- Sharon E. Grubin and John M. Walker Jr., Report of the Second Circuit Task Force on Gender, Racial, and Ethnic Fairness in the Courts, N.Y.U. Ann. Surv. Am. L. 9 (1997).
- John M. Walker Jr., Current Threats to Judicial Independence and Appropriate Responses: A Presentation to the American Bar Association, 12 St. John's J. Legal Comment (Fall 1996).
- John M. Walker Jr., Protectable "Nuggets": Drawing the Line Between Idea and Expression in Computer Program Copyright Protection, 44 J. of the Copyright Soc'y of the USA Vol. 44, No. 2 (Winter 1996).
- John M. Walker Jr., Is the Commission Fulfilling its Mandate?: A Review of the Sentencing Commission's 1994 Annual Report, 8 Federal Sentencing Reporter, Number 2 (September/October, 1995).
- John M. Walker Jr., The Employee Retirement Income Security Act of 1974: An Overview of ERISA Preemption, 17 Am. J. Trial Advoc. 529 (Fall 1993).
- John M. Walker Jr., The Second Circuit Review - 1991-1992 Term Loosening the Administrative Handcuffs: Discretion and Responsibility Under the Sentencing Guidelines, 59 Brook. L. Rev. 551 (1993).
- John M. Walker Jr., Common Law Rules and Land-Use Regulations: Lucas and Future Takings Jurisprudence, 3 Seton Hall Const. L.J. 3 (Spring 1993).
- John M. Walker Jr., Jessica D. Litman, Susan G. Braden, Anthony L. Clapes, Henry B. Gutman, Rochelle Coper Dreyfuss, and Marci A. Hamilton Copyright Protection: Has Look & Feel Crashed?, 11 Cardozo Arts & Ent. L.J. 721 (1992).
- John M. Walker Jr., U.S. v. Sells: Engineering a Result to Promote Grand Jury Secrecy, 21 Am. Crim. L. Rev. 99 (1983).

Legal offices
Preceded by Morris E. Lasker	Judge of the United States District Court for the Southern District of New York; 1985–1989	Succeeded by Sonia Sotomayor
Preceded by Irving Kaufman	Judge of the United States Court of Appeals for the Second Circuit; 1989–2006	Succeeded by Debra Ann Livingston
Preceded by Ralph K. Winter Jr.	Chief Judge of the United States Court of Appeals for the Second Circuit; 2000–2006	Succeeded by Dennis Jacobs
