= George Herbert Walker IV =

American investment banker (born 1969)

- Born: April 1969 (age 57)
- Education: University of Pennsylvania
- Occupations: Corporate CEO, investment banker
- Employer(s): Neuberger Berman; Lehman Brothers; Goldman Sachs
- Parent: George Herbert Walker III

George Herbert Walker IV (born April 1969) is an American investment manager. He is the chairman and CEO of Neuberger Berman, one of the largest independent, employee-owned investment management firms. During Walker's tenure, the firm survived the implosion of its corporate parent, Lehman Brothers, and was repurchased by the employees and has since been amongst the industry's best performers. Walker is the first cousin once removed of 41st U.S. president George H. W. Bush, and the second cousin of 43rd president George W. Bush and Florida governor Jeb Bush.

== Early life and education ==
Walker was raised in St. Louis, Missouri. His parents are Kimberly Gedge and George Herbert Walker III, an investment brokerage executive and U.S. Ambassador to Hungary.

He comes from a family of industrialists and financiers, originally from St. Louis, Missouri. Walker's great-grandfather, George Herbert Walker, was the founder of G. H. Walker & Co., a securities firm, which eventually became part of Merrill Lynch. His grandfather, George Herbert Walker Jr., was a co-founder of the New York Mets. His grand-aunt, Dorothy, married Senator Prescott Bush, father of U.S. President George Herbert Walker Bush and grandfather of U.S. President George Walker Bush.

He went to high school at St. Louis Country Day School. In 1986, he received a scholarship from the U.S. Congress and the German Bundestag to study in Germany for the 1986–87 school year.

Walker went to the University of Pennsylvania where he received the Harry S. Truman Scholarship and was a Benjamin Franklin Scholar. He was also a member of St. Anthony Hall. He graduated Phi Beta Kappa and received a B.S. in Economics and a B.A. in European History, both summa cum laude.

He also received his MBA as a Palmer Scholar from the Wharton School of the University of Pennsylvania.

== Career ==
Walker began his career on Wall Street when he joined Goldman Sachs in the Merger Department in 1992. Six years later, in 1998, Walker became one of the youngest partners in the firm's history. He held several senior positions at Goldman, including co-head of the firm's Wealth Management business / "gs.com", and head of Alternative Investment Strategies.

President George Herbert Walker Bush appointed Walker to the Jacob Javits and Presidential Scholar Boards for the Department of Education.

Walker was recruited to a rival investment bank, Lehman Brothers, to head its Investment Management Division, of which Neuberger Berman was a part. Following Lehman's bankruptcy, Walker led a management buyout and assumed his present position of chairman and CEO of Neuberger Berman. In 2025, Neuberger was named Best Asset Manager for Institutional Investors in the U.S. (Crisil Coalition Greenwich) and the Best Place to Work in Money Management by Pensions and Investments.

In October 2023, Walker was elected to serve as Chair of the Investment Company Institute (ICI) Board of Governors.

In November 2026, Walker was honored with the S&P Global Fund Manager Lifetime Achievement Award.

== Community Service ==
Walker's current board service includes the Partnership for New York City (Vice Chair), the Ford Foundation, Memorial Sloan Kettering Center and the Trinity School.

He served on the board of the New School University, Parsons School of Design (Chair), the University of Pennsylvania Arts & Sciences’ Board of Advisors, and Youth Inc. He also served on the Mayor's Fund to Advance New York City. In 2003, he funded the Alan Charles Kors Term Associate Professor of History at the University of Pennsylvania in honor of a former professor.
