= Albert Walker =

Albert Walker may refer to:

- Albert Johnson Walker (born 1946), identity thief and murderer from Canada
- Albert Shield Walker (1846–1915), first mayor of Springfield, Oregon, U.S.
- Albert Walker (footballer) (1910–1993), English footballer
- Albert Walker (Ontario politician) (1910–1986), Canadian politician
- Albert R. Walker (1881–1958), American architect
- Rube Walker (Albert Bluford Walker, 1926–1992), American baseball player
- Albert Walker (baseball) (fl. 1940), Negro league baseball player
- Albert Thomas Walker, Canadian politician from Ontario

== See also ==
- Bert Walker (disambiguation)
- Albert (disambiguation)
- Walker (disambiguation)
- Walker (surname)
