= Bunce Island =

Port Loko, Sierra Leone

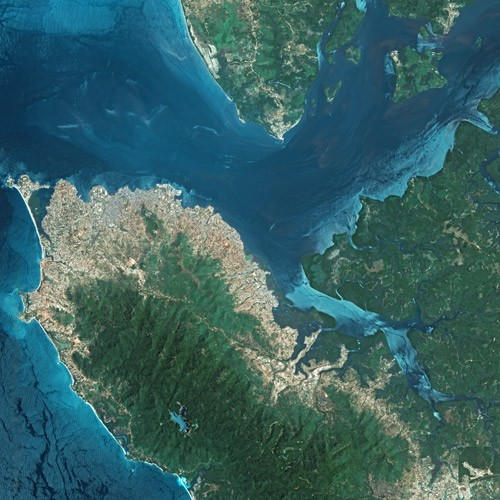
- A satellite picture of Freetown, 2006.

- Location within Africa

Geography
- Location: Sierra Leone River
- Coordinates: 8°34′11″N 13°2′26″W

Administration
- Sierra Leone

Additional information
- Time zone: Greenwich Mean Time (UTC±0)

Bunce Island (also spelled "Bence," "Bense," or "Bance" at different periods) is an island in the Sierra Leone River. It is situated in the estuary of the Rokel River and Port Loko Creek, about 20 miles (32 kilometres) upriver from Sierra Leone's capital city Freetown. The island measures about 1,650 feet (502.9 metres) by 350 feet (106.7 metres) and houses a castle that was built by the Royal Africa Company in c.1670.

Tens of thousands of Africans were shipped from here to the North American colonies of South Carolina and Georgia to be forced into slavery, and are the ancestors of many African Americans of the United States.

Although the island is small, its strategic position at the limit of navigation for ocean-going ships in Africa's largest natural harbour made it an ideal base for European slave traders. To mark the 2007–2008 bicentennial of Britain's abolition of the slave trade, a team at James Madison University created a three-dimensional animation of the castle as it was in 1805, and an exhibit on the site that was displayed to museums all across the U.S. which is now held by the Sierra Leone National Museum.

== History ==
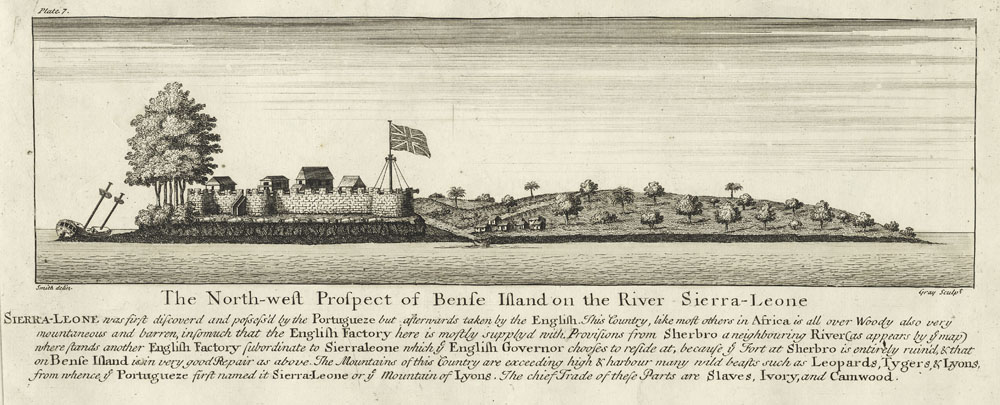
Bunce Island in 1726 during the period of the Royal African Company

Bunce Island was first settled and fortified by English slave traders circa 1670. During its early history, the castle was operated by two London-based firms: the Royal African Company and its offshoot, the Gambia Adventurers, the latter a "Crown-chartered company" or parastatal subsidised by the Crown. On October 31, 1678, at Gresham College the latter offered the former the contents of their investment on the island for 4,644l. 4s. 9d. The castle was not commercially successful but it served as a symbol of English influence in the region, where Portuguese slave traders had been established since the 1500s.

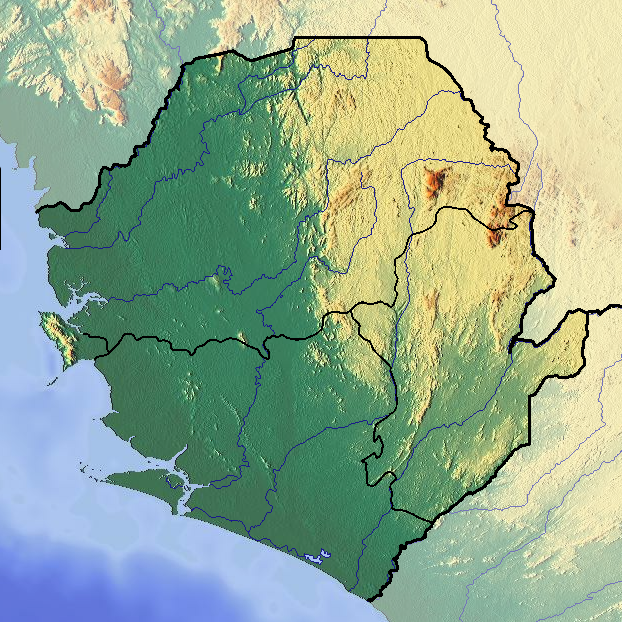
Bunce Island in Sierra Leone

The early phase of the castle's history ended in 1728 when Bunce Island was raided by José Lopez da Moura, a Luso-African slave trader based in the area. He was the richest man in present-day territory of Sierra Leone, the grandson of a Mane king and part of the hybrid Luso-African community that had developed along the lower rivers. This class acted as middlemen, resisting efforts by the Royal African Company to monopolise trade with African rulers. Lopez led others in destroying the Bunce Island facility.

Bunce Island was abandoned until the mid-1740s. It was later operated by the London-based firm Grant, Oswald & Company, founded by Scottish merchants Richard Oswald and Alexander Grant, who took over in 1748.

In 1785 Bunce and a number of other dependent islands were conveyed to the company of John and Alexander Anderson.Throughout the late 18th century, it was a highly profitable enterprise. During the second half of the eighteenth century, the companies sent thousands of slaves from Bunce Island to plantations on the British and French colonies in the West Indies, and to Britain's North American colonies.

Bance Island House, the headquarters building where the Chief Agent lived with his senior officers, was at the centre of the castle. Immediately behind it was the open-air slave yard, which was divided between a large area for men and a smaller one for women and children. Remnants of two watchtowers, a fortification with places for eight cannons, and a gunpowder magazine remain standing. Some of the cannons bear the royal cypher of King George III. At the south end of the island, several inscribed tombstones mark the graves of slave traders, slave ship captains, and the foreman of African workers.

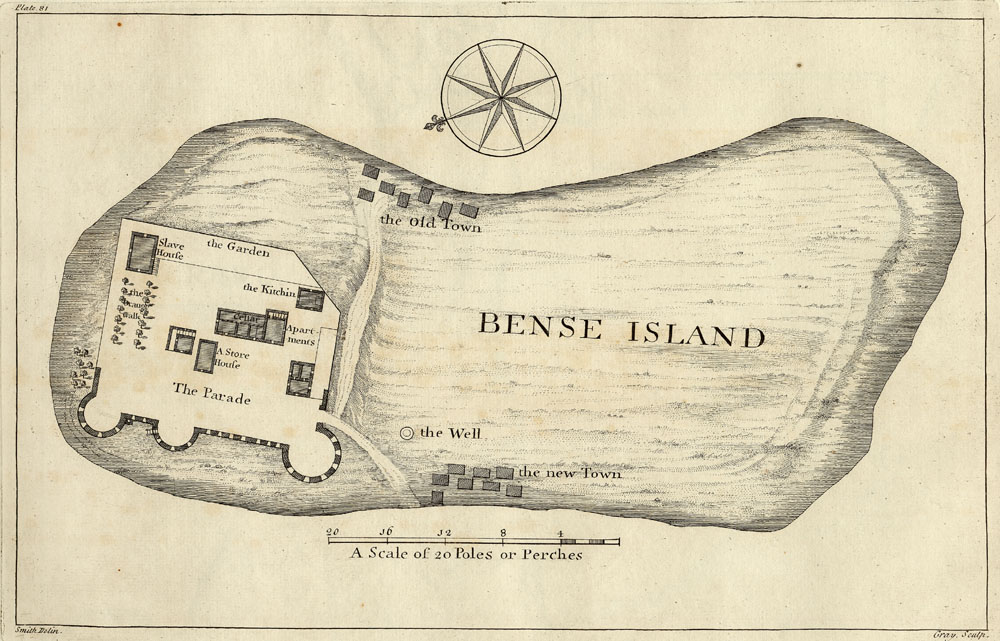
Plan of Bunce Island, 1726

The slave traders who did business at Bunce Island came from a variety of backgrounds. During the castle's early history, Afro-Portuguese—part of what historian Ira Berlin described as the "Atlantic Creole generation"—sold slaves and local products there. They were well-established along the rivers near the coast and were descendants of male Portuguese slave traders known as lançados and African women, and were often bilingual. During the island's later history, Afro-English dynasties became established in communities along the West African coast, beginning in the 17th century. By 1800, there were about 12,000 Afro-English in this area. Mixed-race men from such families as the Caulkers, Tuckers and Clevelands sold slaves and traded goods at Bunce Island. Like the Portuguese descendants, they occupied a middle ground, often marrying into the upper classes of African tribes. The slave ships came from London, Liverpool and Bristol; from Newport, Rhode Island in the North American colonies; and from France and Denmark. They transported slaves mostly to European colonies in the Caribbean and the American South.

Bunce Island was an important British commercial outpost and an attractive target during times of war. French naval forces attacked the castle four times (1695, 1704, 1779, and 1794), damaging or destroying it each time. The attack of 1779 took place during the American War of Independence when the Continental Army's French allies took advantage of the conflict to attack British assets outside North America. Pirates, including Bartholomew Roberts or "Black Bart", the most notorious pirate of the 18th century, attacked in 1719 and 1720. The British traders rebuilt the castle after each attack, gradually altering its architecture during the roughly 140 years it was used as a slave trade entrepôt.

=== Links to North America ===
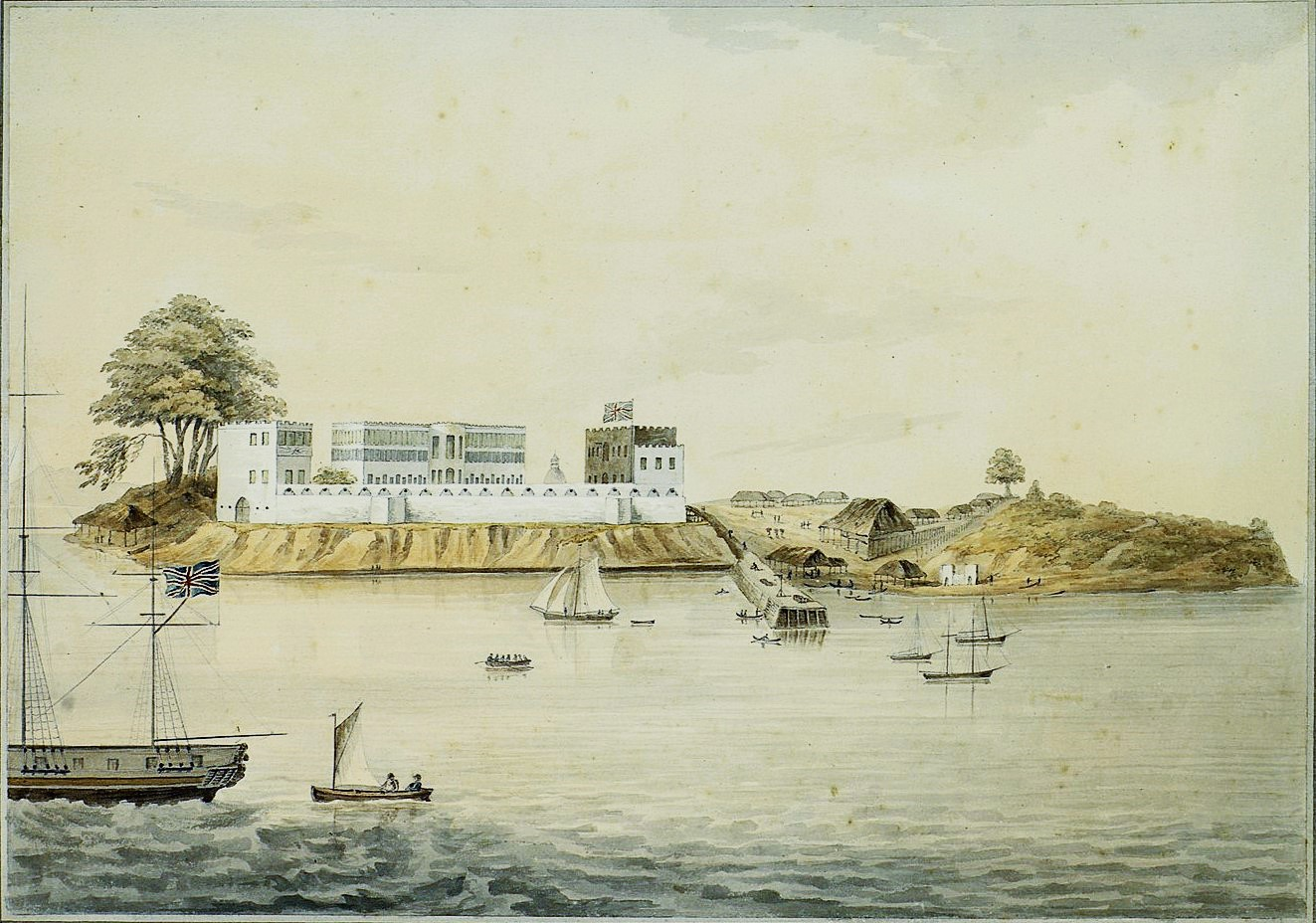
Bunce Island in 1805 during the period of John & Alexander Anderson

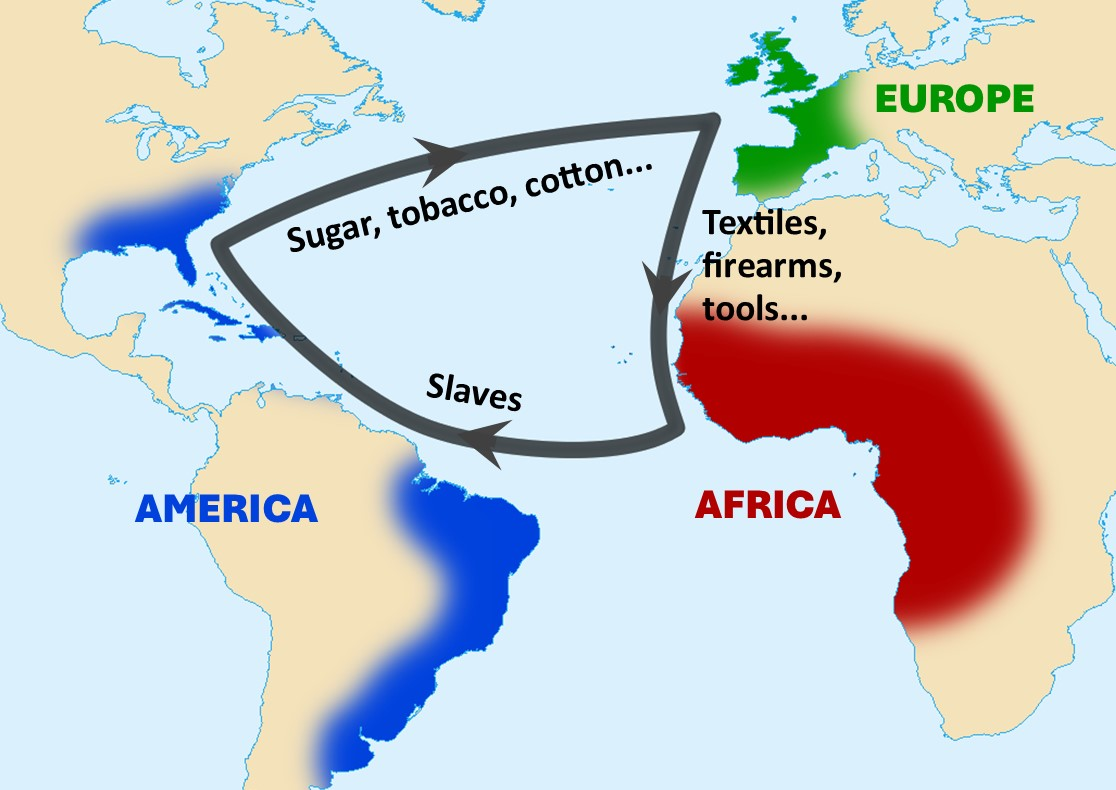
Commercial goods from Europe were shipped to Africa for sale and traded for enslaved Africans. Africans were in turn brought to the regions depicted in blue, in what became known as the "Middle Passage". African slaves were thereafter traded for raw materials, which were returned to Europe to complete the "Triangular Trade".

Bunce Island is best known as one of the chief processing points for slaves to be sold to planters in Lowcountry of the British colonies of South Carolina and Georgia, including the Sea Islands, where they developed extensive rice plantations. Rice requires a great deal of technical knowledge for its successful cultivation. South Carolinan and Georgian planters were willing to pay premium prices for slave labour brought from what they called the "Rice Coast" of West Africa, the traditional rice-growing region stretching from what is now Senegal and Gambia in the north down to present-day Sierra Leone and Liberia in the south. Still, records of the port of Charleston show that nearly 40 percent of the slaves came from Angola.

Bunce Island was the largest British slave castle on the Rice Coast. African farmers with rice-growing skills were kidnapped from inland areas and sold at the castle or at one of its many "outfactories" (trading posts) along the coast before being transported to North America. Several thousand slaves from Bunce Island were taken to the ports of Charleston (South Carolina) and Savannah (Georgia) during the second half of the eighteenth century. Slave auction advertisements in those cities often announced slave cargoes arriving from "Bance" or "Bense" Island.

American colonist Henry Laurens served as Bunce Island's business agent in Charleston, and was a wealthy planter and slave trader. He later was elected as President of the Continental Congress during the Revolutionary War, and was later appointed as the United States envoy to the Netherlands. Captured by the British en route to his post in Europe during the war, he was imprisoned in the Tower of London. After hostilities ended, he became one of the Peace Commissioners who negotiated United States independence under the Treaty of Paris. The chief negotiator on the British side was Richard Oswald, the principal owner of Bunce Island; he and Laurens had been friends for thirty years.

Bunce Island was also linked to the Northern colonies in America. Slave ships based in northern ports frequently called at Bunce Island, taking on supplies such as fresh water and provisions for the Atlantic crossing, and buying slaves for sale in the British islands of the West Indies and the Southern Colonies. The North American slave ships that called at Bunce Island were sailing out of Newport (Rhode Island), New London (Connecticut), Salem (Massachusetts), and New York City.

=== Decline of Bunce Island ===
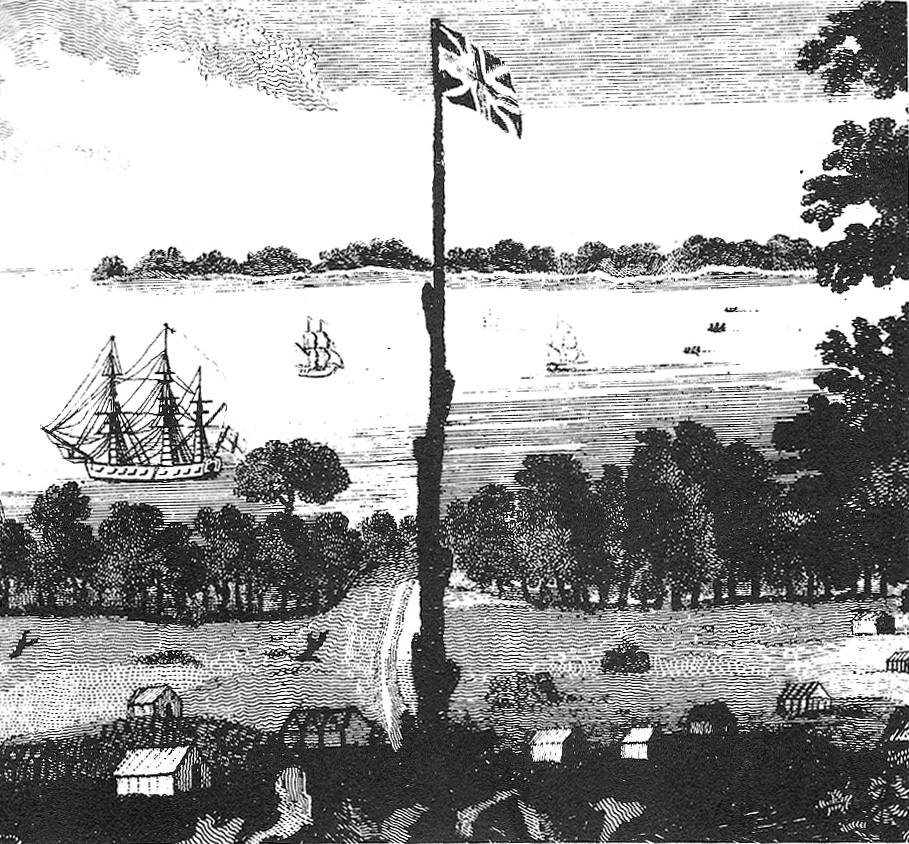
Looking north to Bullom Shore from Voyages to the River Sierra Leone by John Matthews, 1788

In 1787 British philanthropists involved with the Committee for the Relief of the Black Poor in London established Granville Town, a settlement for freed slaves on the Sierra Leone Peninsula, 20 miles (32 kilometres) down-river from Bunce Island. This first attempt at colonisation was unsuccessful and in March 1792, the settlement of Freetown was founded as the basis for the second and only permanent Colony of Sierra Leone. The Atlantic slave trade continued to be legal for the next two decades.

In 1807 the British parliament voted to abolish the slave trade. The following year Freetown became a Crown Colony and the Royal Navy based its Africa Squadron there. They sent regular patrols to search for slave vessels violating the ban. Bunce Island was shut down for slave-trading; British firms used the castle as a cotton plantation, a trading post and a sawmill. These activities were economically unsuccessful and the island was abandoned around 1840, after which the buildings and stone walls fell into decay.

=== Research on Bunce Island ===
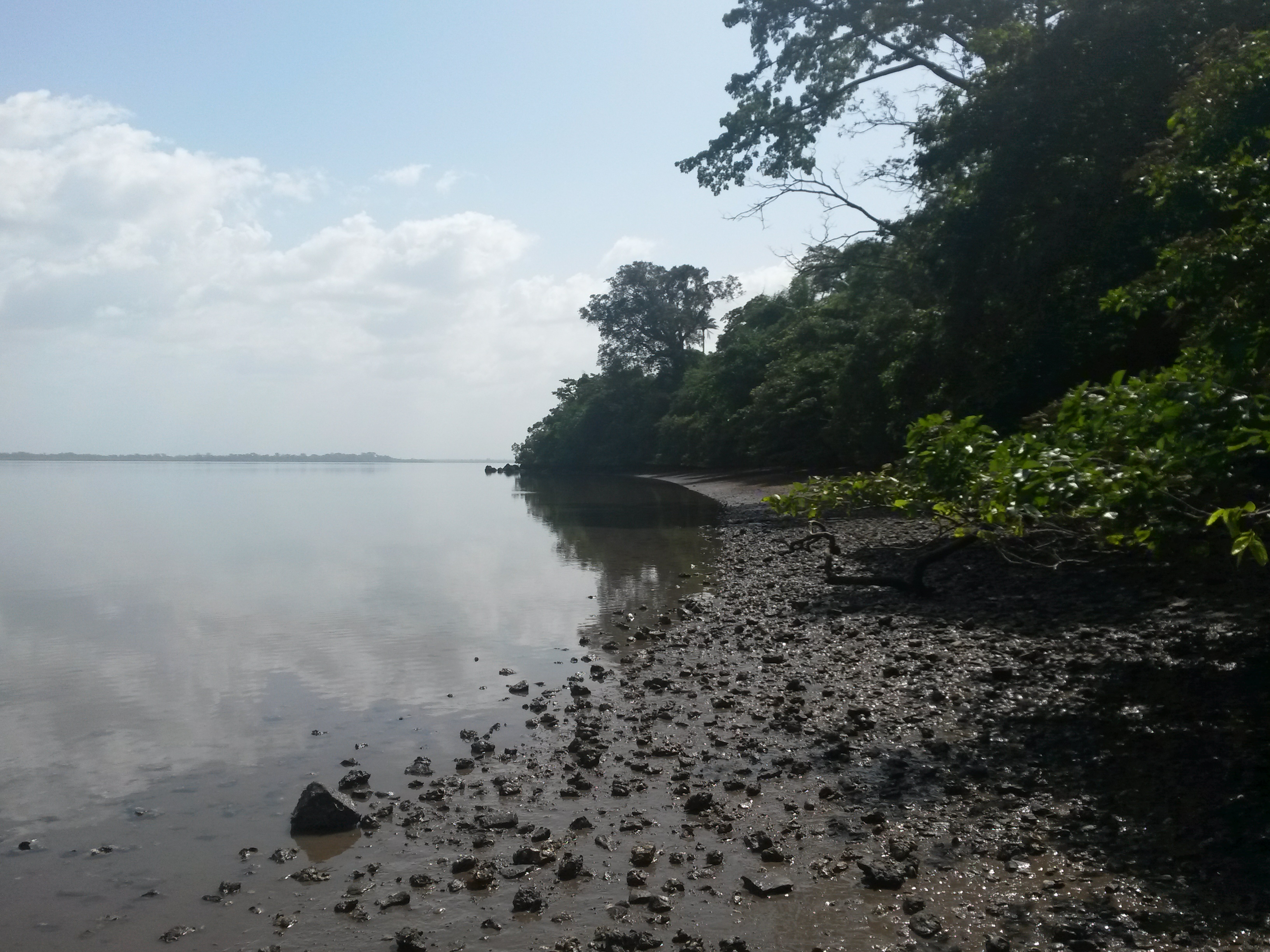
Beach on Bunce Island

Three American scholars have researched Bunce Island. Anthropologist Joseph Opala's research linked the island to the Gullah people of the United States Low Country. He organised the Gullah "homecomings" portrayed in the documentary films: Family Across the Sea (1990), The Language You Cry In (1998), and the website Priscilla's Homecoming (2005). Historian David Hancock documented Bunce Island during the period of Grant, Oswald & Company in his study, Citizens of the World (1997).

In 2006, television actor Isaiah Washington visited the island after learning through a DNA test he was descended from the indigenous Mende people of Sierra Leone. Washington later donated US$25,000 to a project to create a computer reconstruction of Bunce Island as it appeared in 1805, to mark the bicentennial of the abolition of the African slave trade by the UK and the United States. A reconstructed slave ship was docked at the island.

Project directors Joseph Opala and Gary Chatelain at James Madison University created a three-dimensional image of the castle using computer-aided design and historic drawings. It is part of an exhibit portraying the island's history and depicts the buildings as they appeared 200 years ago.

Evidence of numerous historical and genealogical links between Bunce Island and the United States has been found. In 2013, historians reported learning that two U.S. presidents, George H. W. Bush and George W. Bush, are directly descended from a slave-ship captain who operated out of Bunce Island and other ports in the Sierra Leone region in the late 1700s. Their ancestor Thomas Walker (AKA "Beau Walker") came from Bristol, one of Britain's principal slaving ports. Walker was involved in 11 slaving expeditions; he immigrated with his fortune to the US, where he became naturalised in 1792. One of his descendants, Dorothy (Walker) Bush, was the mother of George H.W. Bush.

== Conservation ==
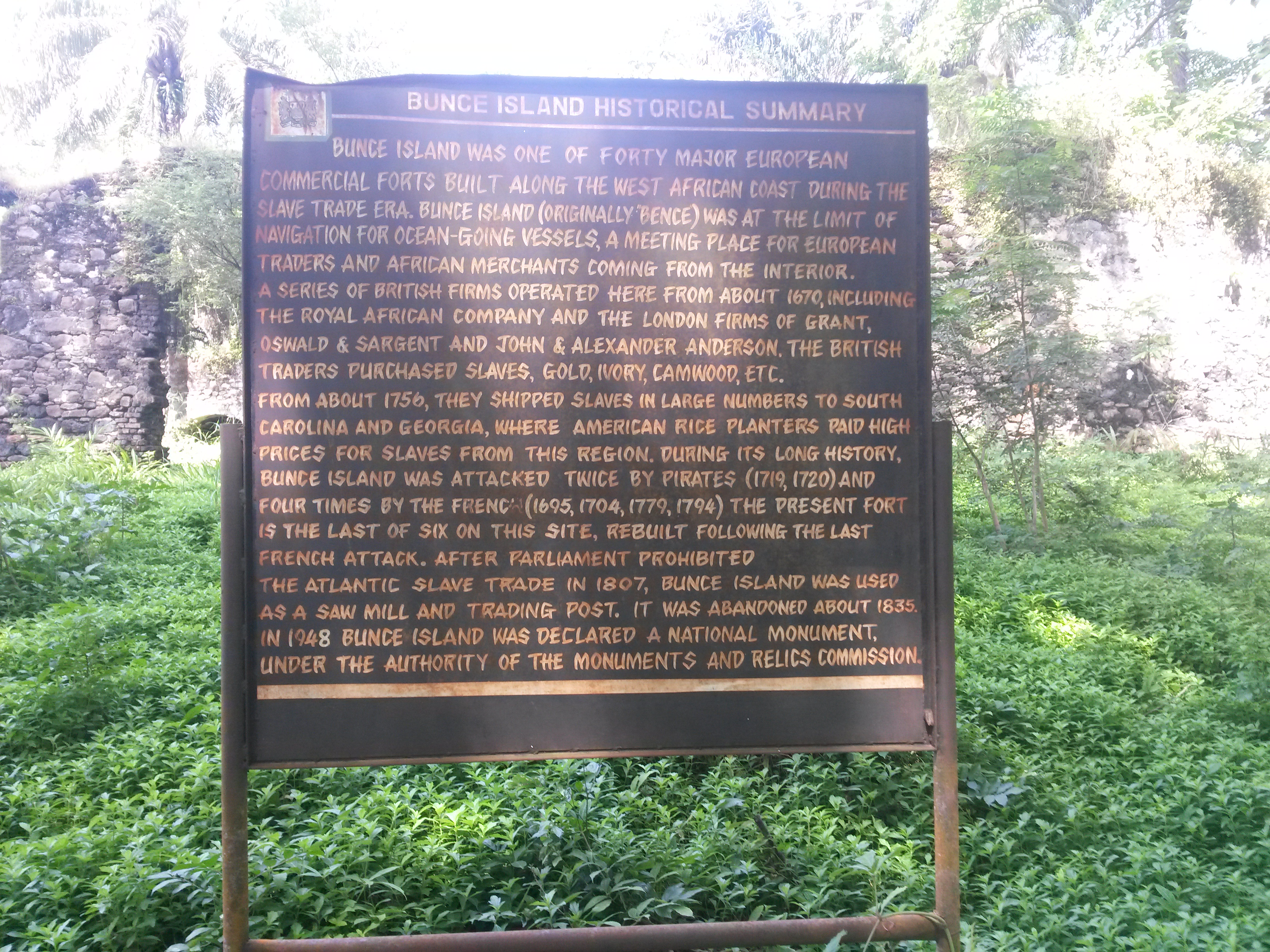
Bunce Island Summary panel for visitors

In 1948, Bunce Island was designated Sierra Leone's first officially protected historic site. The same year, Sierra Leonean amateur historian and medical doctor M.C.F. Easmon led an expedition that cleared the vegetation, mapped the ruins and photographed them for the first time. Research at the island has been underway since the 1970s. A hurricane struck in 1974, damaging structures.

Bunce Island is now protected by the Sierra Leonean Monuments and Relics Commission, a branch of the country's Ministry of Tourism and Culture. The government is working to preserve the castle as an important historic site and as a destination for tourists, especially African Americans. Bunce Island has been called "the most important historic site in Africa for the United States" because thousands of slaves were shipped from here to ports in the American South. Gorée Island in Senegal has become better known than Bunce and has attracted African-American tourists and support for preservation since the 1980s.

In October 2010, the Bunce Island Coalition (US) and its local partner organisation announced the start of the Bunce Island Preservation Project, a five-year, US$5 million effort to preserve the ruins of the castle as a historic landmark and to build a museum in Freetown devoted to the island's history and the influence of the Atlantic slave trade in Sierra Leone.

== Notable visitors ==
General Colin Powell, then Chairman of the US Joint Chiefs of Staff, visited Bunce Island in 1992 while on an official visit to Sierra Leone. Powell spoke of his feelings in a farewell speech he made before leaving the country; "I am an American ... but today, I am something more ... I am an African too ... I feel my roots here in this continent".

== Climate ==
Like the climate for the rest of Sierra Leone, the climate for Bunce Island is tropical, with two seasons determining the agricultural cycle: the rainy season from May to November, and a dry season from December to May, which includes harmattan, when cool, dry winds blow in off the Sahara Desert and the night-time temperature can be as low as 16 °C (60.8 °F). The average temperature is 26 °C (78.8 °F) and varies from around 26 to 36 °C (78.8 to 96.8 °F) during the year.
