= Bush–Davis–Walker family political line =

American political family

The Bush-Davis-Walker family is a political family from the United States that includes former Presidents George H. W. Bush and George W. Bush. The family's political involvement spans the period from 18th to the 21st centuries.

== Politicians ==
- William P. Walker (1778–1858), Massachusetts State Representative, Massachusetts State Senator, Massachusetts Governor's Councilman, Probate Court Judge in Massachusetts, 1824–1848. Father-in-law of Julius Rockwell and David Davis.
  - Julius Rockwell (1805–1888), U.S. House Representative from Massachusetts (1843–1851), U.S. Senator from Massachusetts (1854–1855), candidate for Governor of Massachusetts in 1855. Son-in-law of William P. Walker.
    - Francis W. Rockwell (1844–1929), U.S. Representative from Massachusetts (1884–1891). Son of Julius Rockwell.
  - David Davis (1815–1886), Illinois State Representative in 1845, delegate to the Illinois Constitutional Convention in 1847, Circuit Court Judge in Illinois (1848–1862), delegate to the Republican National Convention in 1860, Justice of the U.S. Supreme Court (1862–1877), candidate for Liberal Republican Party nomination for President of the United States in 1872, U.S. Senator from Illinois (1877–1883). Son-in-law of William P. Walker.
    - David Davis IV (1906–1978), Illinois State Senator (1953–1967), delegate to the Illinois Constitutional Convention (1969 and 1970). Great-grandson of David Davis.
  - Henry Winter Davis (1817–1865), U.S. Representative from Maryland (1855–1861 and 1863–1865). Cousin of David Davis.
  - Prescott Bush (1895–1972), delegate to the Republican National Convention of 1948, 1956 and 1960, candidate for U.S. Senate from Connecticut in 1950, U.S. Senator from Connecticut (1952–1963). Father of George H. W. Bush.
    - George H. W. Bush (1924–2018), delegate to the Republican National Convention 1964, candidate for U.S. Senate from Texas (1964–1970), U.S. Representative from Texas (1967–1971), U.S. Representative to the United Nations (1971–1973), Chairman of the Republican National Committee (1973–1974), U.S. Liaison to the People's Republic of China (1974–1975), candidate for Republican nomination for President of the United States in 1980, Vice President of the United States (1981–1989), President of the United States (1989–1993). First cousin of George Herbert Walker III.
      - George W. Bush (1946–present), candidate for U.S. Representative from Texas in 1978, delegate to the 1988 Republican National Convention, Governor of Texas (1995–2000), President of the United States (2001–2009). Son of George H.W. Bush.
      - John E. "Jeb" Bush (1953–present), Chairman of the Dade County, Florida Republican Party; Florida Secretary of Commerce (1987–1988); candidate for Governor of Florida in 1994; Governor of Florida (1999–2007), candidate for Republican nomination for President of the United States in 2016. Son of George H.W. Bush.
        - George P. Bush (1976–present), Texas Land Commissioner (2015–2023), son of Jeb Bush.
      - John H. Hager (1936–2020), Lieutenant Governor of Virginia (1998–2002), Assistant Secretary for Special Education and Rehabilitative Services (2004–2007), Chair of the Virginia Republican Party (2007–2008), father-in-law of Jenna Bush Hager, the daughter of George W. Bush.
    - George Herbert Walker III (1931–2020), U.S. Ambassador to Hungary (2003-2006), candidate for Republican nomination for U.S. Representative from Missouri in 1992. First cousin of George H. W. Bush.
    - John M. Walker, Jr. (1940–present), Judge of U.S. Court of Appeals (1989–2006), U.S. District Court Judge in New York (1985–1989). First cousin of George H. W. Bush.
    - Craig Roberts Stapleton (1945–present), U.S. Ambassador to the Czech Republic (2001–2004), U.S. Ambassador to France from (2005–2009). Cousin-in-law of George Herbert Walker III and John M. Walker, Jr..
      - Walker Stapleton (1974–present) Colorado State Treasurer (2011–2019), son of Craig Roberts Stapleton.
    - Elizabeth Walker Field (1947–present), delegate to the Republican National Convention of 2004. Cousin of George W. Bush.

== See also ==
- Bush family
- List of United States political families
- Politics
- Political family
