= Campaign for Good Governance =

The Campaign for Good Governance (CGG) is a democracy-supporting NGO in Sierra Leone. CGG promotes the building of democratic institutions, transparency, and accountability in government, active citizen participation in the political process, voter education, human rights, and the rule of law. CGG also sponsors research projects that explore the social conditions that impact good governance. In recent years, CGG has been involved in projects in such diverse areas as gender rights, children's rights, HIV/AIDS, elections, local government, and official corruption.

== History ==
The Campaign for Good Governance was formally established in July 1996, after Sierra Leone's first multi-party democratic elections in three decades. The founders of CGG were Zainab Bangura and Julius Spencer, Sierra Leonean human rights activists, and Joseph Opala, an American historian who lived in the country for many years. During the lead-up to the 1996 elections, the founders worked with other civil society groups to help organize citizen participation. Bangura, in particular, organized thousands of women to demand their democratic rights as citizens. CGG emerged from the alliances forged during that period. The International Crisis Group was also instrumental in helping establish CGG.

Bangura was CGG's first Coordinator. After she left the position in 2002, several others succeeded her, including Abdul Tejan-Cole, Olayinka Creighton-Randall, and Valnora Edwin, CGG's current Coordinator.

== Funding ==
CGG is funded primarily through external sources, including the United States Agency for International Development, the National Endowment for Democracy (Washington, DC), Britain's Department for International Development, and Dutch Interchurch Aid.

== See also ==
Good governance

== Sources ==
- CGG Website
- Sierra Leone Encyclopedia entry
- CGG report on corruption and local government
