= David Davis Walker =

American businessman

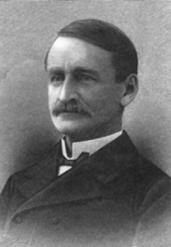
- Born: January 19, 1840; Bloomington, Illinois, U.S.
- Died: October 4, 1918 (aged 78); Kennebunkport, Maine, U.S.
- Resting place: Calvary Cemetery; St. Louis, Missouri, United States
- Education: Beloit College
- Spouse: Martha Adela Beaky (m. 1862)
- Children: 6, including George
- Parent(s): George E. Walker; Harriet Mercer
- Relatives: Thomas Walker (paternal grandfather); David Davis (first cousin); George H. W. Bush (great-grandson); George W. Bush (great-great-grandson)

David Davis Walker (January 19, 1840 – October 4, 1918) was an American businessman. He started his career as a dry goods wholesaler in St. Louis, Missouri. He was the co-founder of Ely & Walker, which remains a clothing brand to this day.

== Early life ==
David Davis Walker was born on January 19, 1840, on a farm near Bloomington, Illinois, to George E. Walker (1797–1864) and Harriet Mercer (1802–1869). His paternal grandfather, Thomas Walker, was an English slave trader. Walker was a first cousin of Senator and Supreme Court Justice David Davis.

At age fourteen, he was sent to the Beloit Preparatory Academy, part of Beloit College in Wisconsin.

== Business career ==
In 1857, Walker went to St. Louis for business training with the merchandiser Crow, McCreery & Co., then the largest wholesale dry goods house in the city. He worked his way up from office boy, and became a partner after just eight years with the firm. He became ill as a result of his workaholic habits, quitting in 1878, and spent the next two years recovering.

In 1880, he went back to work, forming Ely, Walker & Co. with Frank Ely and others. The business was highly successful, and in 1883 it was incorporated as the Ely & Walker Dry Goods Company. He remained President of the company until 1892, and thereafter retained the largest interest in the firm. In 1896, the company built a massive warehouse on Washington Avenue in St. Louis, Missouri, which became known as Ely Walker Lofts. His sons David Davis, Jr., Joseph Sidney and George Herbert all had involvement with the Ely & Walker firm, which continued as a major clothing manufacturer until it was acquired by Burlington Industries after World War II, but George went into banking.

== Personal life ==
Walker married Martha Adela Beaky. They had six children including George Herbert Walker.

== Death and legacy ==
Walker died in 1918 at Walker's Point, his son George's seaside property in Kennebunkport, Maine, the modern-day Bush compound. His great-grandson, George H. W. Bush, and his great-great-grandson, George W. Bush, both served as President of the United States.
