= G. H. Walker & Co. =

American investment banking and brokerage firm

- Industry: Banking, Finance
- Founded: 1900; 126 years ago in New York City, United States
- Founder: George Herbert Walker
- Defunct: 1974
- Fate: Sold to White Weld & Co.

G.H. Walker & Co. was an investment banking and brokerage firm founded in 1900 by George Herbert Walker, grandfather and great-grandfather of Presidents George Herbert Walker Bush and George Walker Bush, and located at 1 Wall Street.

== Background ==
The firm was originally based in St. Louis, Missouri.

In July 1973, the firm acquired the securities brokerage business of Laird, Inc. The company, later known as G.H. Walker, Laird & Co., was sold to White Weld & Co. in October 1974. White Weld, in turn, was sold to Merrill Lynch in 1978.

Other notable former employees include Bill Donaldson, later founder of Donaldson, Lufkin & Jenrette and chairman of the Securities and Exchange Commission. Bert Walker, later was chairman and CEO of Stifel Financial in the late 1970s and 1980s.
