= George Harrison (cricketer, born 1860) =

English cricketer and educator

Personal information
- Full name: George Crawford Harrison
- Born: 27 June 1860; Maida Hill, Middlesex, England
- Died: 16 March 1900 (aged 39); Edinburgh, Midlothian, Scotland
- Batting: Right-handed
- Bowling: Right-arm slow

Domestic team information
- Years: Team
- 1880–1883: Oxford University

Career statistics
Competition	First-class
Matches	18
Runs scored	237
Batting average	8.46
100s/50s	–/–
Top score	28
Balls bowled	2,585
Wickets	64
Bowling average	19.21
5 wickets in innings	4
10 wickets in match	–
Best bowling	7/69
Catches/stumpings	18/–
- Source: Cricinfo, 5 May 2020

George Crawford Harrison (27 June 1860 – 16 March 1900) was an English first-class cricketer and educator.

== Life ==
The son of William Harrison, he was born at Maida Hill in June 1860. He was educated firstly at Malvern College, leaving in 1874 for Clifton College. From Clifton he went up to Oriel College, Oxford in 1879.

After graduating from Oxford, Harrison became an assistant master at Clifton in 1883, before holding the same position at Fettes College in Edinburgh from 1890 until his death there in March 1900 from pleuropneumonia following influenza.

== Cricket ==
While a student at Oxford, Harrison played first-class cricket for Oxford University, making his debut against the Marylebone Cricket Club at Oxford in 1880. He played first-class cricket for Oxford until 1883, making a total of eighteen appearances. Primarily a slow bowler who was described by Wisden Cricketers' Almanack as “a good slow bowler, twisting the ball both ways”, he took a total of 64 wickets for Oxford at an average of 19.21. Harrison took a five wicket haul on four occasions, with best figures of 7 for 69. Wisden commented that in later matches he “developed an extraordinary twist from leg”, alluding to him becoming a leg spin bowler. He was less successful with the bat, scoring 237 runs with a high score of 28.

== Family ==
Harrison married in 1887 Selina Margaret Atlay, daughter of James Atlay.
