= George Croxton Walker =

British military officer

- Born: 1888
- Died: 1936 (aged 47–48)
- Military career
- Allegiance: United Kingdom
- Branch: British Army
- Rank: Major
- Conflicts: World War I
- Awards: OBE; MC; TD; Mentioned in despatches (x2); Order of Saint Stanislaus
- Other work: Fellow of the Auctioneers’ Institute

Major George Croxton Walker OBE MC TD (1888–1936) was a British military officer who distinguished himself in World War I. In 1919, he was part of the Expeditionary Force to North Russia for which he was made OBE and a Knight of the Russian Order of Stanislaus.

== Life ==
George Croxton Walker was born in Bedford in 1888 and educated at Bedford Modern School. His father, also named George Croxton Walker, was a businessman who was prominent in the civic life of Bedford.

Walker gained a commission in the County Territorials (Royal Engineers) in 1908. He was promoted to captain in June 1914 and went to France on 24 December 1914 with the 1st East Anglian Field Company where he attained the rank of Major in June 1916. He was awarded the Military Cross and was twice mentioned in despatches. In 1919, he went to North Russia with the Expeditionary Force after which he was made OBE and a Knight of the Russian Order of Saint Stanislaus. He also received the Territorial Decoration.

After World War I, Walker became a partner in his father's firm and was made a Fellow of the Auctioneers’ Institute. On his death in 1936, he left a widow and a son.
