= Emory Campbell =

Community leader among the Gullah Geechee subgroup of African-Americans

Emory Campbell is a community leader among the Gullah people, African Americans who live in the coastal low country region of South Carolina and Georgia. The Gullahs have preserved more of their African linguistic and cultural heritage than any other black community in the US.

Campbell was born and raised on Hilton Head Island, South Carolina, before the island — now an internationally famous resort area — was connected to the mainland by a bridge. When he went to high school on the mainland in the 1950s, he discovered that his Gullah language was so "deep" that even his African American teachers had trouble understanding him and the other children from the islands. Campbell would later earn a bachelor's degree in biology from Savannah State University and a master's degree in environmental engineering from Tufts University in Boston. Throughout his adult life, he has been a peacemaker within his community. Campbell has been instrumental in creating connections between Gullah communities and the outside world. In 1988 he hosted Joseph Momoh, the President of Sierra Leone, to make visible newly established links between the peoples of Sierra Leone and the Gullah.

Today, the Gullah Heritage Trail Tours, founded under Campbell's leadership, continue to serve as a vital link in preserving and sharing Gullah culture. The operations are now guided by Emory Campbell, who oversees the tours with a strong commitment to cultural integrity and community education, ensuring the legacy of Gullah traditions remains accessible to visitors from around the world.

Campbell began his career in the 1970s as a community development activist, working to implement public health measures in impoverished rural areas and to preserve traditional Gullah communities threatened by out-of-control resort development on the sea islands. Later, as the Executive Director of Penn Center, Inc. on St. Helena Island, South Carolina Campbell helped lead the movement to preserve Gullah culture and make Gullah people in the rural areas more aware of the importance of their uniquely rich African cultural heritage. Campbell was a member of the committee that translated the New Testament into the Gullah language.

Beginning in the 1980s, Campbell helped spearhead the efforts to reestablish the family connection between the Gullah people and the West African nation of Sierra Leone. Campbell hosted Sierra Leone's President Joseph Saidu Momoh for the "Gullah Reunion" at Penn Center in 1988, and led the historic "Gullah Homecoming" to Sierra Leone in 1989. These events took place in the capital, Freetown, and the Mende village of Taiama. The Sierra Leoneans made Campbell an honorary paramount chief with the royal title of Kpaa Kori I. These events are chronicled in the South Carolina Educational Television documentary video "Family Across the Sea" (1990).

In 2005, Campbell received the Carter G. Woodson Memorial Award from the National Education Association for his lifelong work preserving Gullah heritage, the environment, and improving the Gullah community's living conditions.

In 2008 Mr. Campbell was elected Chairman of the Gullah-Geechee Cultural Heritage Corridor Commission, an organization empowered by the U.S. Congress to develop a program to commemorate Gullah culture in the low country region from Wilmington, North Carolina to Jacksonville, Florida.

Campbell is author of Gullah Cultural Legacies (2008), a synopsis of Gullah traditions, customary beliefs, art forms and speech. Campbell is the director of Gullah Heritage Consulting Services based on Hilton Head Island, South Carolina, and he manages the Gullah Heritage Trail Tours on Hilton Head.
