= George Harrison (prospector) =

South African prospector

George Harrison was the prospector who allegedly discovered gold in the Witwatersrand on Langlaagte farm. He was a friend of George Walker and George Honeyball. He apparently found the main reef in 1886. He later left the Rand.

He is believed to have sold his claim for £10.

The site of Harrison's claim has since become George Harrison Park in Johannesburg. In 2013 and 2015 the park was reported to be in a state of disrepair; as of June 2019 an undated article on the Johannesburg Parks website states that a major refurbishment is planned.

A 1988 statue of Harrison by Tienie Pritchard, also known as "The Miner", was commissioned to celebrate the centenary of Johannesburg. It is 4 metres (13 ft) tall and is described as "one of the largest sculptures in South Africa". It is sited at Settlers Park, Eastgate.

== Sources ==
- Ensiklopedie van Suidelike Afrika, Eric Rosenthal, 1967.
