= Albert Shield Walker =

American politician

Albert Shield Walker (January 1, 1846 – September 15, 1915) was the first mayor of Springfield, Oregon, in 1885 and a blacksmith.

In 1868, William Walker's son Albert Shields Walker married Sarah "Lizzie" Higgins and at this time the Walker household contained William, Polly, son Albert and wife Lizzie and their infant son Alva, and youngest daughter Tryphena.

He was born in southwestern Missouri and became a founding member of the local chapter of Independent Order of Odd Fellows, Springfield Lodge, No. 70, organized October 24, 1881, and entitled with the position "L.S.V.G." Four years later he would become this city's mayor.

He died on September 15, 1915, in Springfield.
