= George Walker (cricketer, born 1919) =

English cricketer

Personal information
- Full name: George Arthur Walker
- Born: 25 January 1919; West Bridgford, Nottinghamshire, England
- Died: 31 August 1995 (aged 76); Bridlington, Yorkshire, England
- Batting: Right-handed
- Bowling: Right-arm fast

Domestic team information
- Years: Team
- 1937: Nottinghamshire

Career statistics
Competition	First-class
Matches	2
Runs scored	24
Batting average	24.00
100s/50s	0/0
Top score	10*
Balls bowled	288
Wickets	1
Bowling average	176.00
5 wickets in innings	0
10 wickets in match	0
Best bowling	1/98
Catches/stumpings	1/–
- Source: Cricinfo, 8 March 2013

George Arthur Walker (25 January 1919 – 31 August 1995) was an English cricketer. Walker was a right-handed batsman who bowled right-arm fast. He was born at West Bridgford, Nottinghamshire.

Walker made two first-class appearances for Nottinghamshire in the 1937 County Championship against Yorkshire at Headingley, and Lancashire at Trent Bridge. Despite bowling a total of 48 overs in his two matches, Walker took just a solitary wicket, that of Lancashire's Eddie Phillipson. With the bat he scored a total of 24 runs with a high score of 10 not out.

At the end of the 1937 season Walker retired from professional cricket and joined the Nottingham City Police.

He died at Bridlington, Yorkshire, on 31 August 1995.
