= George Harrison (footballer, born 1900) =

English footballer (1900–1969)

Personal information
- Full name: George Harrison
- Date of birth: 12 December 1900
- Place of birth: South Moor, County Durham, England
- Date of death: 1969 (aged 68)
- Place of death: County Durham, England
- Height: 5 ft 8 in (1.73 m)
- Position: Wing half

Senior career*
Years	Team	Apps	(Gls)
- Tanfield Lea Institute
- Houghton Rovers
1920–1921	Sunderland	0	(0)
- Annfield Plain
1922–1924	Durham City	10	(1)
1924–192?	Darlington	1	(0)
- West Stanley
1926–19??	Carlisle United	28 (Note: Carlisle United infobox statistics only cover the 1928–29 Football League season.)	(0)
- Lancaster Town
1934–19??	Lancaster Corporation Omnibus		
- * Club domestic league appearances and goals

George Harrison (12 December 1900 – 1969), also known as Ginger Harrison, was an English footballer who played as a wing half in the Football League for Darlington, Durham City and Carlisle United. He was on the books of Sunderland without making a first-team appearance, and played non-league football for Tanfield Lea Institute, Houghton Rovers, Annfield Plain, West Stanley and Lancaster Town.

== Life and career ==
Harrison was born in South Moor, County Durham, in 1900. He worked as a coal miner, and played football for Tanfield Lea Institute and Houghton Rovers before signing for Sunderland as an amateur. He never played for that club's first team, and after a spell with North-Eastern League club Annfield Plain, he signed amateur forms for Durham City, about to embark on their second season in the Football League Third Division North.

Beginning the season in the reserves, Harrison made his Football League debut on 23 December 1922 at home to Wigan Borough, playing at left half after the previous occupant of that position, Arthur Andrews, signed for Sunderland. He played in five of the next six matches, on either side of the half-back line, and scored once, a penalty in a 1–1 draw at home to Chesterfield. He spent the remainder of his Durham career as a reserve and occasional first-team stand-in. The last of his 10 senior appearances was as one of three different centre forwards tried at the beginning of the 1923–24 season before the arrival of Tom Elliott from Brentford filled the vacancy.

In August 1924, Harrison joined another Third Division North club, Darlington, and finally turned professional in November. He did not play for the first team until February 1925, in a goalless draw away to Bradford Park Avenue: George Malcolm switched to right back to cover for the absent Tommy Greaves and Harrison took over Malcolm's regular position at left half. That was his last appearance as Darlington went on to win the Northern Section title. He was retained for the coming season in the Second Division, and played for the reserves, but was not used at the higher level.

Harrison spent time with West Stanley before signing for another North-Eastern League club, Carlisle United, in 1926. He was a regular in the teams that finished fifth and second in his first two seasons, and after Carlisle's election to the Third Division North, the opinion of the Athletic News season preview was that "last season's half-backs, Harrison, Ross and Pigg, are sure to be in harness again". All three played in Carlisle's first match in the Football League, and Harrison went on to appear in 28 of Carlisle's 42 Northern Section matches, as well as in the FA Cup ties. According to a newspaper profile ahead of the FA Cup first round, "he is not a great constructive player, but is a rare tackler." He was retained for the following season, but appeared only in the reserves.

He signed for Lancaster Town in September 1930, and went straight into the team for their next Lancashire Combination match. Harrison finished the season with 34 appearances, and was a member of the team that won the Lancashire Junior Cup. He was retained for the following season, but was not a regular in the side. In January 1934, he was reinstated as an amateur to play for Lancaster Corporation Omnibus Company's works team.

Harrison died in 1969 at the age of 68. His death was registered in the second quarter of that year in the Durham North West district.
