= George Harrison (civil servant) =

English barrister (1767–1841)

Sir George Harrison, FRS, KCH (19 June 1767 – 3 February 1841) was an English barrister and civil servant. During a tenure of twenty-one years at the Treasury, he presided over the growth of a professional civil service and an increasing transfer of power from political appointees to administrators.

== Biography ==
An able young lawyer, he entered government service as register and counsel to the committee for redemption of land tax, initiated by Pitt in 1798, and was called to the bar in 1800. As the legal novelties of the redemption were worked out, his duties grew more routine, freeing him for promotion in 1805.

=== Assistant Secretary of the Treasury ===
In that year, Pitt appointed him to the newly created post of Assistant Secretary of the Treasury. His duties there were both clerical and administrative, serving to reduce the routine work of the second secretary. The increasing business of the Treasury at the time necessitated the growth of a specialised bureaucracy, relatively independent of the constraints of patronage, and Harrison would oversee its growth during the 21 years he spent in the post.

Upon the death of Pitt in 1806 and the formation of the Ministry of All the Talents, Harrison stood in some danger of losing his post at the Treasury. The Duke of Buckingham attempted to secure it for William Henry Fremantle, and Harrison was only protected by the firmness of Grenville. Harrison and the first secretary, Vansittart were instrumental in the creation of Petty's "New Plan of Finance", and for this and his assiduity in dischanging his duties, Harrison received a raise in pay from £2 000 p.a. to £2 500 in 1807.

=== Auditor of the Treasury ===
Having survived the change of ministries in 1806, Harrison easily weathered the fall of the coalition, and became a trusted adviser to Spencer Perceval. Harrison handled the financing of the Peninsular War, became one of the two auditors of the treasury in 1807, and helped to reorganise the audit office. He was admitted a Fellow of the Royal Society on 5 February 1807. His pay was raised again to £3 000 p.a. in 1809. With the accession of Liverpool as Prime Minister in 1812, his old colleague Vanisttart became Chancellor of the Exchequer, and Harrison's influence and responsibility at the Treasury reached their greatest heights. He acted as an adviser to the government in regard to the organisation of the Treasury, and to the Chancellor of the Exchequer in his dealings with the Bank of England and City financial interests. He also played some role in aiding the first secretary, whose duties now principally concerned patronage and politics. Harrison's extensive knowledge of the Treasury and talents for efficient administration were highly respected, and his salary raised to £3 500 p.a. in 1815.

Under his tenure, control of Treasury business largely passed into the hands of the bureaucrats and clerks of which he was chief. After 1809, the meetings of the Lords of the Treasury became largely pro forma, and the Prime Minister and Chancellor ceased to attend them in 1827.

=== Auditor of the Duchy of Cornwall ===
In 1826, Harrison resigned the secretaryship (and auditorship), to be replaced as Assistant Secretary by his subordinate William Hill. His legacy at the Treasury was to have lain the foundations for the modern Civil Service.

In 1823, while still at the Treasury, Harrison had been appointed auditor of the Duchy of Cornwall, and in 1826 became auditor of the Duchy of Lancaster, posts which he held until his death. His "Substance of a Report on the Laws and Jurisdiction of the Stannaries in Cornwall" was published in 1835. It is possible that this work may have been drawn on in the legal proceedings which terminated in the passage of the Cornwall Submarine Mines Act of 1858.

He was appointed Knight Commander of the Royal Guelphic Order and Knight Bachelor in 1831, one of the first civil servants to receive knighthood.

=== Family ===
By his first wife, Dorothy Bunting (m. 1791; d. 1802), he had two sons, one of whom died in youth; he had no children by his second wife, Ann (m. 1829; d. 1840), widow of his subordinate and successor William Hill.
