= George Walker (Australian footballer) =

Australian rules footballer (1894–1973)

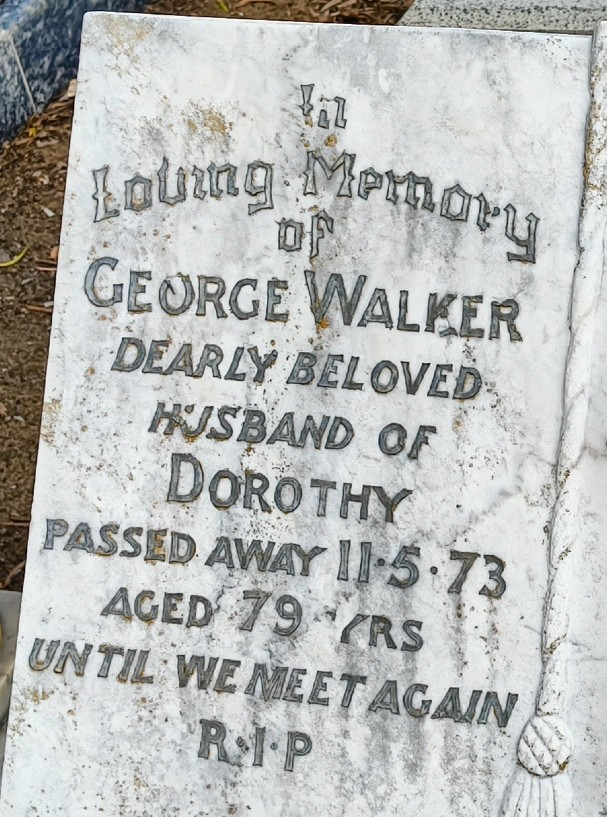
- Walker's grave at Karrakatta Cemetery

Personal information
- Full name: George Walker
- Born: 14 May 1894; Coburg, Victoria
- Died: 11 May 1973 (aged 78); Perth, Western Australia
- Original team: Melbourne Districts/Coburg

Playing career^{1}
Years	Club	Games (Goals)
1914–15, 1919–21	Melbourne	49 (0)
- ^{1} Playing statistics correct to the end of 1921.

George Walker (14 May 1894 – 11 May 1973) was an Australian rules footballer who played with Melbourne in the Victorian Football League (VFL). He died in Perth and is buried at Karrakatta Cemetery.
