= Alternative Investment Strategies =

Alternative Investment Strategies Limited (LSE: AIS) was a large British investment fund dedicated to investing in hedge funds. Established in December 1996, the company was listed on the London Stock Exchange. The Chairman was Nicholas Wilson. It returned all its assets to investors and closed down in February 2014.
