= George Walker (South Africa) =

George Walker (1853 - September 18, 1924) was one of the alleged discoverers of the main gold reef on the Witwatersrand. He was born in Wigan, Lancashire, and emigrated as a young man to South Africa, where he worked as a prospector for the rest of his life. In 1886, the year he discovered the reef, he began working for the Struben brothers.

Walker never received any credit for the discovery and died in poverty in Krugersdorp on 18 September 1924.

== Sources ==
- Ensiklopedie van Suidelike Afrika, Eric Rosenthal, 1967.
