= George Herbert Walker III =

American diplomat (1931–2020)

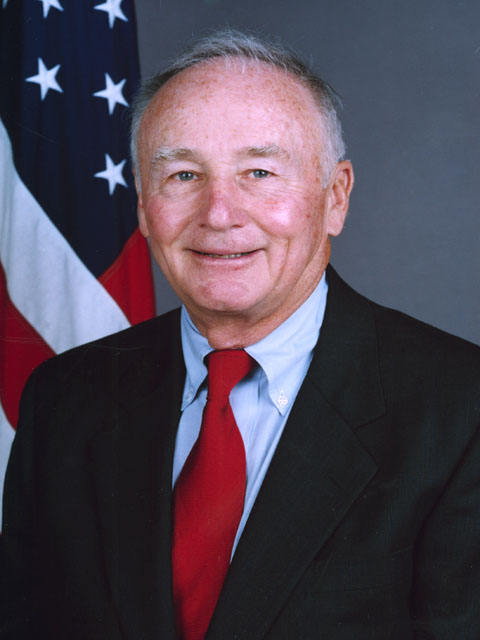

United States Ambassador to Hungary
- In office October 6, 2003 – August 4, 2006
- President: George W. Bush
- Preceded by: Nancy Brinker
- Succeeded by: April H. Foley

Personal details
- Born: March 16, 1931 St. Louis, Missouri, U.S.
- Died: January 19, 2020 (aged 88) St. Louis, Missouri, U.S.
- Spouse: Carol Banta
- Children: 5, including George Herbert Walker IV
- Parent(s): George Herbert Walker Jr. Mary Carter
- Relatives: David Davis Walker (great-grandfather); George Herbert Walker (grandfather); George H. W. Bush (cousin); George W. Bush (cousin)
- Education: Yale University; Harvard Law School
- Occupation: Businessman, diplomat

George Herbert Walker III (March 16, 1931 – January 18, 2020) was an American businessman, diplomat and philanthropist. Walker served as the United States Ambassador to Hungary from 2003 to 2006. He was a first cousin of President George H. W. Bush as well as first cousin once removed of George W. Bush and Jeb Bush.

== Early life ==
Walker was born in St. Louis on March 16, 1931. His paternal grandfather, George Herbert Walker, was the founder of G. H. Walker & Co., which is now part of the Merrill Lynch conglomerate; he also served as the President of W.A. Harriman Co. (1916-1929), which is now known as Brown Brothers Harriman & Co. Walker III was the son of Mary (Carter) and George Herbert Walker Jr., the cofounder of the New York Mets baseball team with Joan Whitney Payson. His first cousin, George Herbert Walker Bush, served as the President of the United States.

Walker graduated from Yale University in 1953, where he was a member of Skull and Bones. He received a law degree from the Harvard Law School in 1955. He served in the U. S. Air Force for two years as staff judge advocate at Wright Patterson Air Force Base in Dayton, Ohio.

== Career ==
Walker then returned to St. Louis and worked first with his grandfather's company, G. H. Walker & company, then with Stifel Nicolaus in 1977. During his term as CEO, Stifel Nicolaus became a publicly traded firm on the New York Stock Exchange.

In 1992, Walker was a candidate for the U.S. House seat representing Missouri's 2nd Congressional District, but was defeated by then-State Rep. Jim Talent in the Republican primary by a margin of 58% to 32%.

Walker served as the United States Ambassador to Hungary under his cousin from 2003 to 2006.

In 2007, Walker became the general partner at the Danube Fund.

== Philanthropy ==
Walker served on the Board of Directors of Webster University from 1974 on. Following a significant donation to Webster University in 2005, the business school was renamed the George Herbert Walker School of Business and Technology.

In 2016 Ambassador Walker and his wife Dr. Carol Walker made the founding gift to launch The Walker Leadership Institute at Eden Theological Seminary. The Institute focuses on Common Good leadership at the intersection of business and faith. The founding director of the Walker Leadership Institute, the Rev Steve Lawler, previously served as rector of St. Stephen's & The Vine Episcopal Church in Ferguson, Missouri and as a member of faculty and a program coordinator for University College of Washington University in St. Louis.

== Personal life ==
Walker was married to the former Carol Banta and they had eight children between them and fifteen grandchildren. His son, George Herbert Walker IV, is the Chief Executive Officer of investment management firm Neuberger Berman. Walker died on January 19, 2020, aged 88.

Diplomatic posts
Preceded by Nancy Brinker	United States Ambassador to Hungary; 2003–2006	Succeeded by April H. Foley
