= George Herbert Walker =

American financier (1875–1953)

- Born: June 11, 1875; St. Louis, Missouri, U.S.
- Died: June 24, 1953 (aged 78); New York City, U.S.
- Education: Washington University in St. Louis
- Occupations: Businessman, banker
- Known for: Namesake of grandson George H. W. Bush, et al.
- Political party: Democratic
- Spouse: Lucretia Wear (m. 1899)
- Children: Nancy; Dorothy; George Jr.; James; John; Louis
- Parents: David Davis Walker; Martha Adela Beaky
- Relatives: Prescott Bush (son-in-law); George H. W. Bush (grandson); George W. Bush (great-grandson); Walker Stapleton (great-grandson)

George Herbert "Bert" Walker Sr. (June 11, 1875 – June 24, 1953) was an American banker and businessman. He was the maternal grandfather of the 41st United States President George H. W. Bush and a great-grandfather of George W. Bush, both of whom were named in his honor. He was also the amateur heavyweight-boxing champion of Missouri while studying law at Washington University School of Law.

== Early life and education ==
George Herbert Walker was born on June 11, 1875, in St. Louis, Missouri. Walker was descended from a Maryland family. He was the youngest son of David Davis Walker, a dry goods merchant from Bloomington, Illinois, and Martha Adela (Beaky). Ely, Walker & Company, which grew into a leading regional wholesaler, was later acquired by Burlington Industries.

Walker, who was Roman Catholic, was educated at Stonyhurst College, a Jesuit boarding school in England. He graduated from Washington University in St. Louis in 1897.

== Career ==
=== Business career ===
Walker started a banking and investment firm named G.H. Walker & Co. in 1900. His family had developed many international banking contacts, and he helped organize the 1904 St. Louis World's Fair. Walker was known as the power behind the local Democratic Party.

In 1920, Walker became the President of the W.A. Harriman & Co. investment firm, and quickly arranged the credits that W. Averell Harriman needed to take control of the Hamburg-Amerika Line. Walker also organized the American Ship and Commerce Corp. to be subsidiary of the W.A. Harriman & Co., with contractual power over the affairs of the Hamburg-Amerika. W.A. Harriman & Co. (renamed Harriman Brothers & Company in 1927) well-positioned for this enterprise and rich in assets from their German and Russian business, merged with the British-American investment house Brown Bros. & Co. on January 1, 1931. Walker retired to his own G.H. Walker & Co. This left the Harriman brothers, his son-in-law Prescott Bush and Thatcher M. Brown as senior partners of the new firm of Brown Brothers Harriman & Co. The firm's London branch continued operating under its historic name Brown, Shipley & Co.

Walker was a director of the W.A. Harriman & Company; Harriman Fifteen, American International Corporation; Georgian Manganese Corporation; Barnsdall Corporation; American Ship & Commerce Corporation; Union Banking Corporation; G.H. Walker & Company; Missouri Pacific Railroad; Laclede Gas and the New Orleans, Texas and Mexico Railroad.

=== Golf and horse racing ===
In addition to his business concerns, Walker was also a golf enthusiast and a President of the United States Golf Association (USGA). The USGA's Walker Cup (the famous biennial golf match) acquired Walker's namesake for his role in the event's creation. Walker was a member of Deepdale Golf Club as well as National Golf Links of America, the location of the first Walker Cup.

He also coheaded the syndicate, (with W. Averell Harriman), which rebuilt the famed sports venue of Madison Square Garden and the Belmont Race Track, 1925.

== Personal life ==
Walker married Lucretia Wear (1873–1961), daughter of James H. Wear and they had six children:

- Dorothy Wear Walker, wife of U.S. Senator Prescott Bush, mother of President George H. W. Bush and grandmother of George W. Bush;
- George Herbert Walker Jr., co-founder of the New York Mets;
- Dr. John M. Walker Sr., CEO of Memorial Sloan-Kettering Cancer Center and father of Judge John M. Walker Jr.;
- James Wear Walker;
- Nancy Walker; and
- Louis Walker (S&B 1936).

His brother-in-law Joseph Walker Wear was one of the founders of the Davis Cup. His son-in-law Prescott Bush was a member of the executive committee of the USGA, serving successively as Secretary, Vice President and President, 1928–1935. Walker not only maintained the Walker's Point estate in Kennebunkport, but also a mansion on Long Island, and a stunning residence at One Sutton Place in Manhattan. In the 1930s Walker purchased the 10,000-acre (40 km^{2}) Duncannon Plantation near Barnwell, South Carolina, as a private hunting retreat. In the 1940s Walker moved out of the circa 1835 plantation house, and the property became a hunting club. Much of the land was later purchased by the U.S. Government for development of the Savannah River Site.

== Death and legacy ==
Walker died in 1953 in New York City, aged 78. He was survived by his wife, several grandchildren including George H. W. Bush, Ambassador to Hungary and Stifel Nicolas CEO George Herbert Walker III, William H. T. (Bucky) Bush, Nancy Ellis Bush, Ray Walker, Betty Walker Holden, and many great-grandchildren including George W. Bush and Jeb Bush.
