= George Herbert Walker Jr. =

American baseball team owner (1905–1977)

- Born: November 24, 1905
- Died: November 29, 1977 (aged 72)
- Occupation: businessman
- Spouse: Mary Carter (1927-1977, his death)
- Children: George Herbert Walker III
- Parent(s): George Herbert Walker; Lucretia "Loulie" (Wear) Walker
- Relatives: George H. W. Bush (nephew); George W. Bush (grand-nephew); George Herbert Walker IV (grandson)

George Herbert Walker Jr. (November 24, 1905 – November 29, 1977) was an American businessman and an uncle of President George H. W. Bush.

== Early life and education ==
George Herbert Walker Jr. was born on November 24, 1905. His father was George Herbert Walker, a wealthy American businessman. His mother was Lucretia "Loulie" (Wear) Walker (1874–1961), daughter of James H. Wear. His elder sisters were Nancy Walker, and Dorothy Walker Bush.

Walker graduated from Yale University. He became a member of the Skull and Bones society at Yale in 1927, as were his brother-in-law Prescott Bush (S&B 1917); brothers Dr. John Mercer Walker Sr. (S&B 1931) and Louis Walker (S&B 1936); and his nephew, the 41st President of the United States, George Herbert Walker Bush (S&B 1947); and Bush's son (therefore George's great-nephew), George W. Bush (S&B 1968).

== Business career ==
Walker was an original owner of the New York Mets, a team which he co-founded in 1960 (and began play in 1962) with Joan Whitney Payson.

== Personal life ==
He married Mary Carter (20 November 1905 – 5 September 1998) on October 29, 1927. They had three children, one of whom was George Herbert Walker III, the former United States Ambassador to Hungary. His nephew George H. W. Bush, served as the 41st President of the United States.

== Death ==
Walker died on November 29, 1977, at the age of 72.
