= Robert Walker =

Robert, Rob, Bob or Bobby Walker may refer to:

== Entertainment ==
- Robert Walker (actor, born 1888) (1888–1954) American actor
- Robert Walker (actor, born 1918) (1918–1951), actor in Strangers on a Train (1951)
- Robert Walker (actor, born 1940) (1940–2019), actor in Ensign Pulver and Easy Rider
- Robert Walker (animator) (1961–2015), Disney animator who directed Brother Bear
- Robert Walker (painter) (1599–1658), English portrait painter
- Robert Walker (musician) (1937–2017), American blues guitarist
- Robert Walker (composer) (born 1946), English composer and broadcaster
- Robert G. Walker (1917–1988), American television director
- Bob Walker (photographer) (1952–1992), American photographer and environmental activist
- Rob Walker (poet) (born 1953), Australian poet

== Politics ==
- Robert Walker (MP) (1597–1673), English merchant and Royalist during the English Civil War
- Robert F. Walker (1850–1930), Missouri attorney general and justice of the Missouri Supreme Court
- Robert J. Walker (1801–1869), Mississippi senator, U.S. Treasury Secretary under President Polk
  - USCS Robert J. Walker, a survey ship in the United States Coast Survey
- Robert Jarvis Cochran Walker (1838–1903), congressman from Pennsylvania
- Robert Walker (Canadian politician) (1916–1989), Saskatchewan lawyer and attorney general
- Bob Walker (Pennsylvania politician) (born 1942), member of the Congress of the United States from Pennsylvania
- Robert Major Walker, first African American mayor of Vicksburg, Mississippi

== Religion ==
- Robert Walker (priest, of Seathwaite) (1709–1802), Church of England clergyman in the Lake District
- Robert Walker (moderator) (1716–1783), Church of Scotland minister and historian
- Robert Walker (minister) (1755–1808), minister in the Church of Scotland
- Robert Francis Walker (1789–1854), English cleric and translator
- Robert Walker (archdeacon of Peterborough) (fl. 1956–1962), Canadian Anglican priest

== Sports ==
=== Association football (soccer) ===
- Bob Walker (footballer, born 1942), English footballer
- Bobby Walker (footballer, born 1879) (1879–1930), Scottish international footballer
- Bobby Walker (footballer, born 1906) (1906–?), Scottish footballer in Scotland and the United States
- Robert Walker (Third Lanark footballer) (1857–1936), one of the first black Scottish footballers
- Robert Walker (footballer, born 1884) (1884–late 1940s), English footballer
- Robert Walker (footballer, born 1903), English footballer for Bradford City
- Robert Walker (footballer, born 1922) (1922–1991), Scottish footballer for Bournemouth and Wrexham
- Robert Walker (footballer, born 1982), Scottish footballer for Hamilton
- Robert Walker (Swedish footballer) (born 1987), Swedish footballer for Örebro

=== Australian rules football ===
- Bob Walker (footballer, born 1891) (1891–1965), Australian footballer for Essendon
- Bob Walker (footballer, born 1912) (1912–1997), Australian footballer for Geelong
- Bobby Walker (Australian footballer) (1900–1971), Australian footballer for Fitzroy
- Robert Walker (Australian footballer) (born 1970), Australian rules footballer

=== Other sports ===
- Bob Walker (racing driver) (1942–2018), American race car driver
- Bobby Walker (golfer) (1943–1995), Scottish golfer
- Bob Walker (wrestler), American Greco-Roman wrestler
- Bobby Walker (wrestler), American professional wrestler
- Robert Walker (American football) (born 1972), American college football running back
- Robert Walker (rower) (born 1973), Australian Olympian rower.
- R. T. Walker (Robert Taylor Walker, 1914–?), American baseball player

== Other ==
- R. Bailey Walker (1839–1885), English clergyman, activist, editor, and writer
- Robert Sandilands Frowd Walker (1850–1917), British soldier and colonial officer in Malaya
- Robert Barrie Walker (1878–1961), British trade unionist
- Robert M. Walker (physicist) (1929–2004), American physicist and planetary scientist
- Robert Walker (sailor) (1929–2016), United States Navy
- Robert Walker, Baron Walker of Gestingthorpe (1938-2023), British law lord and Lord of Appeal in Ordinary
- Robert M. Walker (born 1949), United States Under Secretary of the Army, 1997–1998
- Robert Bruce Napoleon Walker, English trader, explorer and collector of zoological specimens
- R. B. J. Walker, Canadian international relations theorist

== See also ==
- Rob Walker (disambiguation)
- Robert Matthew-Walker (born 1939), English writer and composer
- Bert Walker (disambiguation)
- Walker (surname)
