= Ice skating =

Self-propulsion of a person over ice, wearing bladed skates

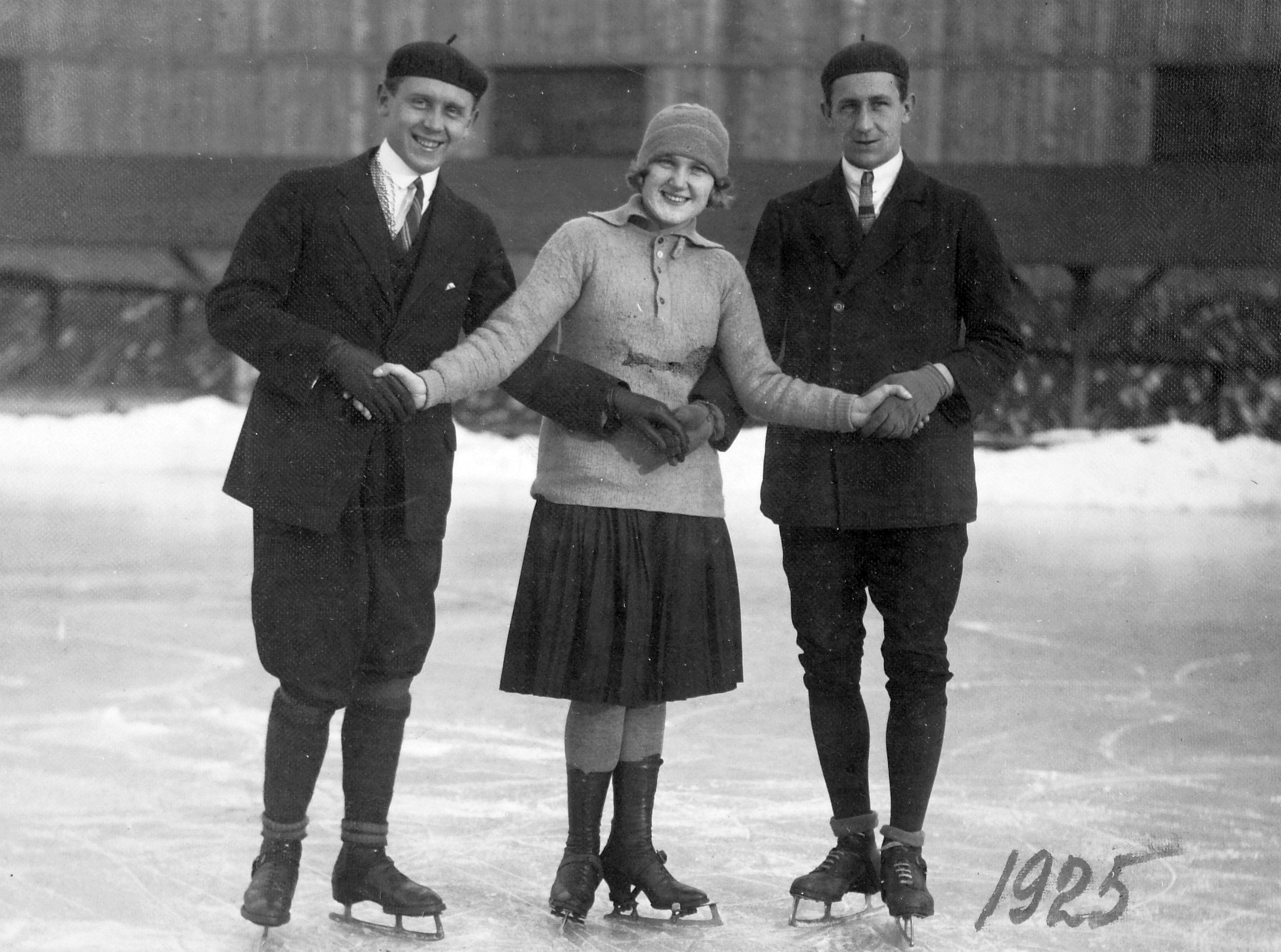
Outdoor ice skaters in 1925

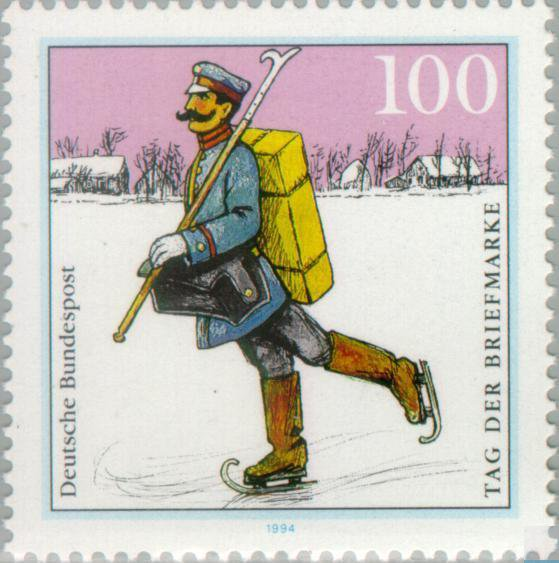
A postman in Germany during the winter of 1900 (stamp from 1994)

Ice skating is the self-propulsion and gliding of a person across a flat ice surface, using metal-bladed ice skates. People skate for various reasons, including recreation (fun), exercise, competitive sports, and commuting. Ice skating may be performed on naturally frozen bodies of water, such as ponds, lakes, canals, and rivers, and on human-made ice surfaces both indoors and outdoors.

Natural ice surfaces used by skaters can accommodate a variety of winter sports which generally require an enclosed area, but are also used by skaters who need ice tracks and trails for distance skating and speed skating. Man-made ice surfaces include ice rinks, ice hockey rinks, bandy fields, ice tracks required for the sport of ice cross downhill, and arenas.

Various formal sports involving ice skating have emerged since the 19th century. Ice hockey, bandy, rinkball, and ringette are team sports played with, respectively, a flat sliding puck, a ball, and a rubber ring. Synchronized skating is a unique artistic team sport derived from figure skating. Figure skating, ice cross downhill, speed skating, and barrel jumping (a discipline of speed skating) are among the sporting disciplines for individuals.

== History ==
=== Early history of ice skating ===
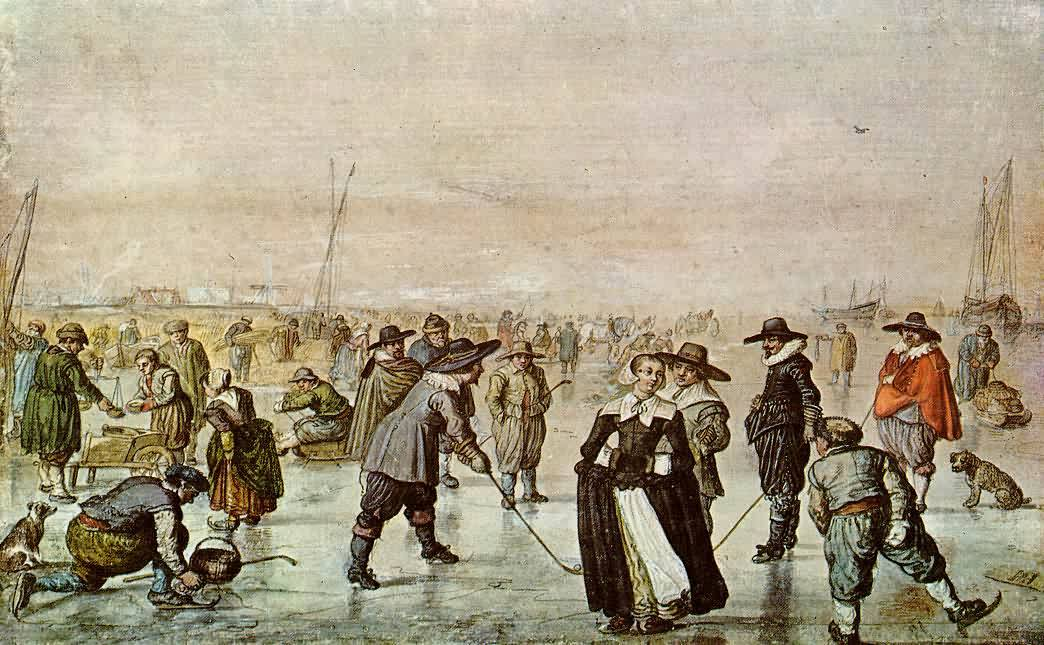
Skating fun by 17th century Dutch painter Hendrick Avercamp

Research suggests that the earliest ice skating happened in southern Finland more than 4,000 years ago. This was done to save energy during winter journeys. True skating emerged when a steel blade with sharpened edges was used. Skates now cut into the ice instead of gliding on top of it. The Dutch added edges to ice skates in the 13th or 14th century. These ice skates were made of steel, with sharpened edges on the bottom to aid movement.

The fundamental construction of modern ice skates has stayed largely the same since then, although differing greatly in the details, particularly in the method of binding and the shape and construction of the steel blades. In the Netherlands, ice skating was considered proper for all classes of people, as shown in many pictures from Dutch Golden Age painters.

Ice skating was also practiced in China during the Song dynasty, and became popular among the ruling family of the Qing dynasty. Ancient ice skates, made of animal bones, were found at the bronze age Gaotai Ruins in north west China, and are estimated to be likely 3,500 years old. Archeologists say these ancient skates are "clear evidence for communication between China and Europe" in the Bronze Age era, as they are very similar to bone skates unearthed in Europe.

=== Rising popularity and first clubs ===
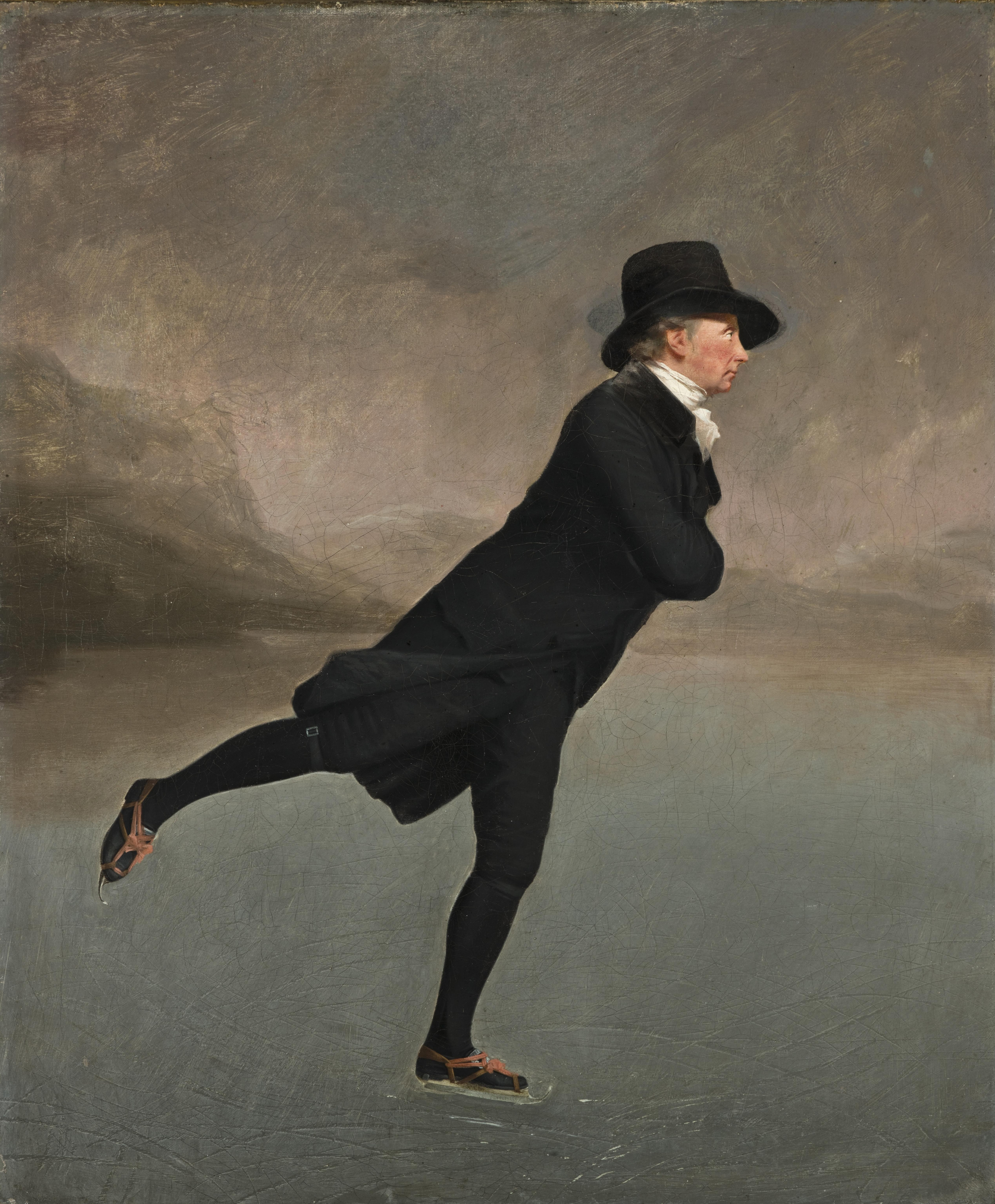
The Skating Minister by Henry Raeburn, depicting a member of the Edinburgh Skating Club in the 1790s

In England "the London boys" had improvised butcher's bones as skates since the 12th century. Skating on metal skates seems to have arrived in England at the same time as the garden canal, with the English Restoration in 1660, after the king and court returned from an exile largely spent in the Netherlands. In London the ornamental "canal" in St James's Park was the main centre until the 19th century. Both Samuel Pepys and John Evelyn, the two leading diarists of the day, saw it on the "new canal" there on 1 December 1662, the first time Pepys had ever seen it ("a very pretty art"). Then it was "performed before their Majesties and others, by diverse gentlemen and others, with scheets after the manner of the Hollanders". Two weeks later, on 15 December 1662, Pepys accompanied the Duke of York, later King James II, on a skating outing: "To the Duke, and followed him in the Park, when, though the ice was broken, he would go slide upon his skates, which I did not like; but he slides very well." In 1711 Jonathan Swift still thinks the sport might be unfamiliar to his "Stella", writing to her: "Delicate walking weather; and the Canal and Rosamund's Pond full of the rabble and with skates, if you know what that is."

The first organised skating club was the Edinburgh Skating Club, formed in the 1740s; some claim the club was established as early as 1642.

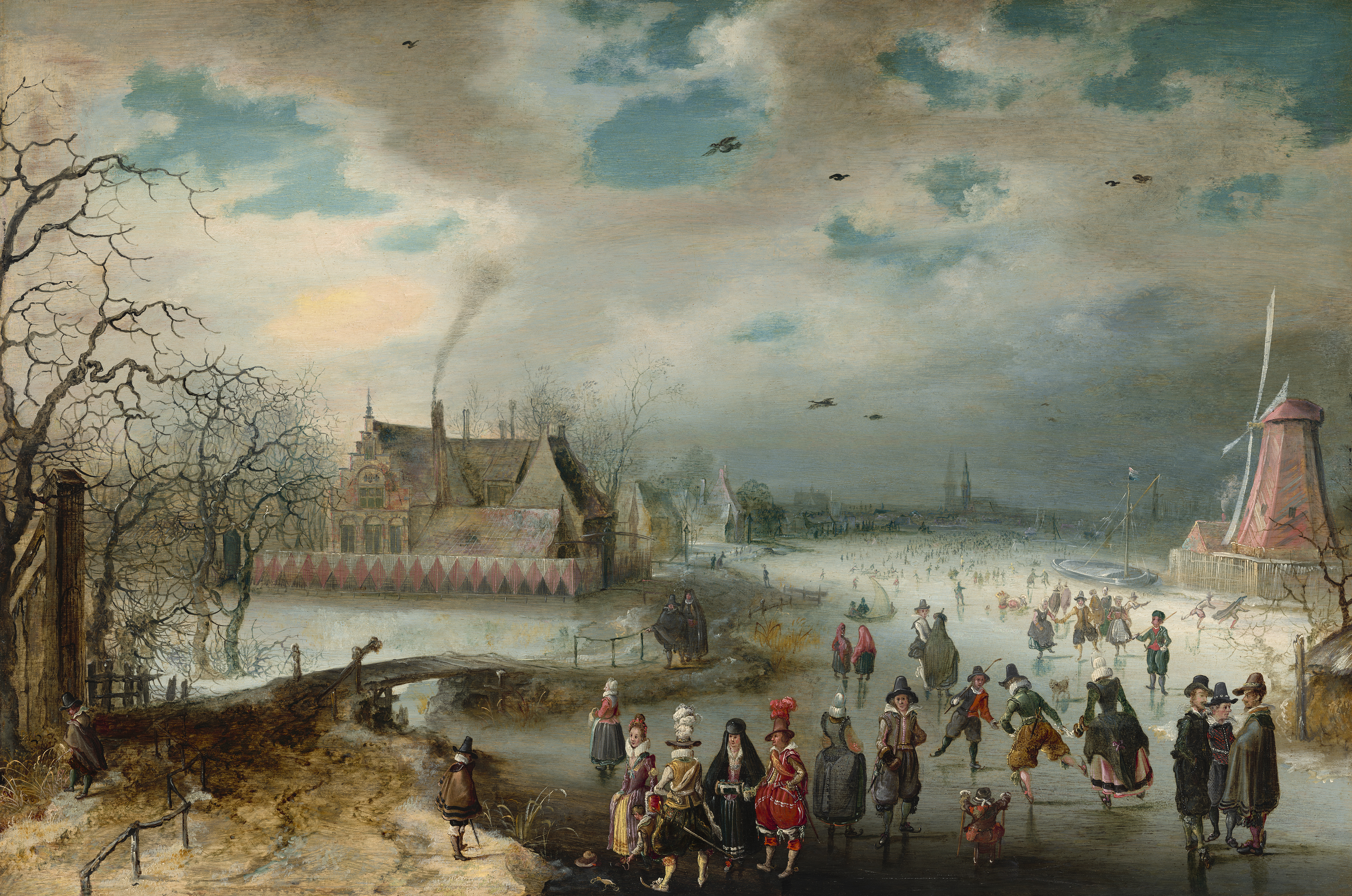
Adam van Breen, Skating on the Frozen Amstel River, 1611, National Gallery of Art

An early contemporary reference to the club appeared in the second edition (1783) of the Encyclopædia Britannica:

The metropolis of Scotland has produced more instances of elegant skaters than perhaps any country whatever: and the institution of a skating club about 40 years ago has contributed not a little to the improvement of this elegant amusement.

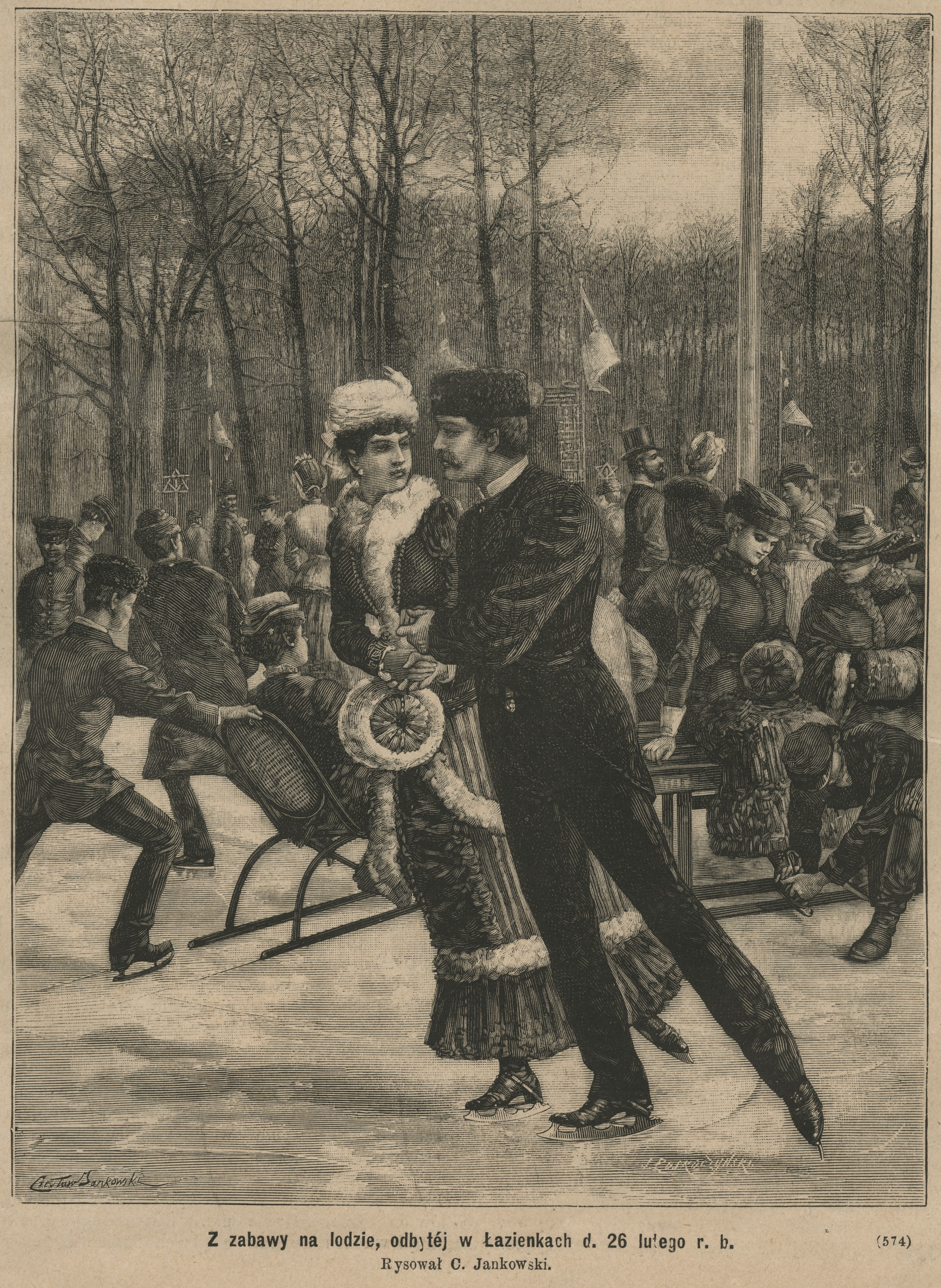
Ice skating party in Warsaw in the 1880s

From this description and others, it is apparent that the form of skating practiced by club members was indeed an early form of figure skating rather than speed skating. For admission to the club, candidates had to pass a skating test where they performed a complete circle on either foot (e.g., a figure eight), and then jumped over first one hat, then two and three, placed over each other on the ice.

On the Continent, participation in ice skating was limited to members of the upper classes. Emperor Rudolf II of the Holy Roman Empire enjoyed ice skating so much, he had a large ice carnival constructed in his court in order to popularise the sport. King Louis XVI of France brought ice skating to Paris during his reign. Madame de Pompadour, Napoleon I, Napoleon III, and the House of Stuart were, among others, royal and upper-class fans of ice skating.

The next skating club to be established was in London and was not founded until 1830. Members wore a silver skate hanging from their buttonhole and met on The Serpentine, Hyde Park on 27 December 1830. By the mid-19th century, ice skating was a popular pastime among the British upper and middle classes. Queen Victoria became acquainted with her future husband, Prince Albert, through a series of ice skating trips. Albert continued to skate after their marriage and on falling through the ice was once rescued by Victoria and a lady in waiting from a stretch of water in the grounds of Buckingham Palace.

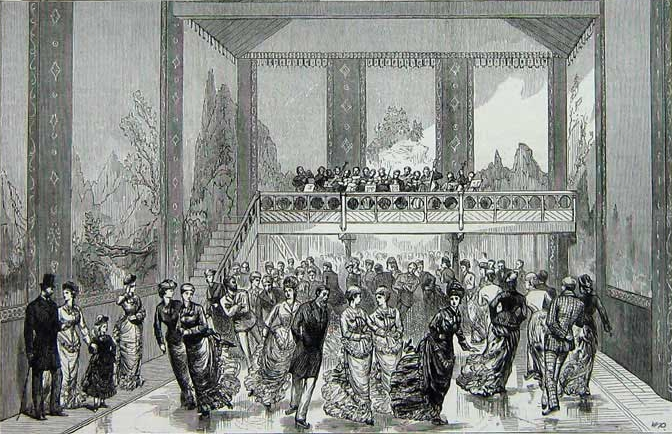
Interior of the Glaciarium in 1876

Early attempts at the construction of artificial ice rinks were made during the "rink mania" of 1841–44. As the technology for the maintenance of natural ice did not exist, these early rinks used a substitute consisting of a mixture of hog's lard and various salts. An item in the 8 May 1844 issue of Littell's 'Living Age' headed the 'Glaciarium' reported that "This establishment, which has been removed to Grafton Street East' Tottenham Court Road, was opened on Monday afternoon. The area of artificial ice is extremely convenient for such as may be desirous of engaging in the graceful and manly pastime of skating."

=== Emergence as a sport ===
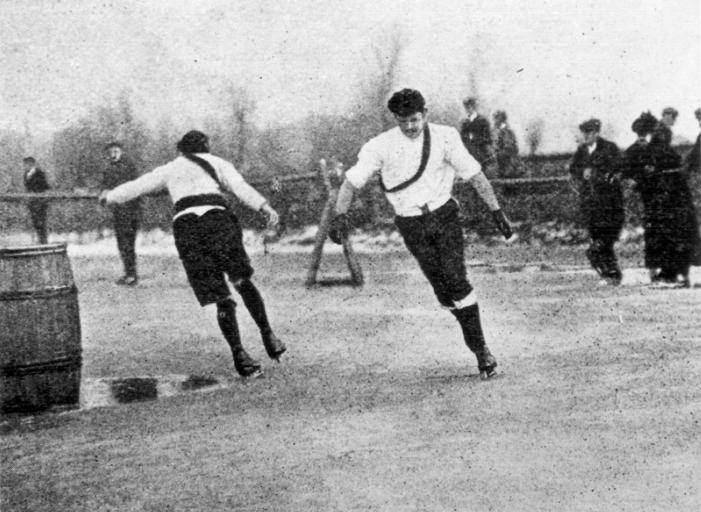
19th-century fen skating

Skating became popular as a recreation, a means of transport and spectator sport in The Fens in England for people from all walks of life. Racing was the preserve of workers, most of them agricultural labourers. It is not known when the first skating matches were held, but by the early nineteenth century racing was well established and the results of matches were reported in the press. Skating as a sport developed on the lakes of Scotland and the canals of the Netherlands. In the 13th and 14th centuries wood was substituted for bone in skate blades, and in 1572 the first iron skates were manufactured. When the waters froze, skating matches were held in towns and villages all over the Fens. In these local matches men (or sometimes women or children) would compete for prizes of money, clothing, or food.

The winners of local matches were invited to take part in the grand or championship matches, in which skaters from across the Fens would compete for cash prizes in front of crowds of thousands. The championship matches took the form of a Welsh main or "last man standing" contest (single-elimination tournament). The competitors, 16 or sometimes 32, were paired off in heats and the winner of each heat went through to the next round. A course of 660 yards was measured out on the ice, and a barrel with a flag on it placed at either end. For a one-and-a-half-mile race the skaters completed two rounds of the course, with three barrel turns.

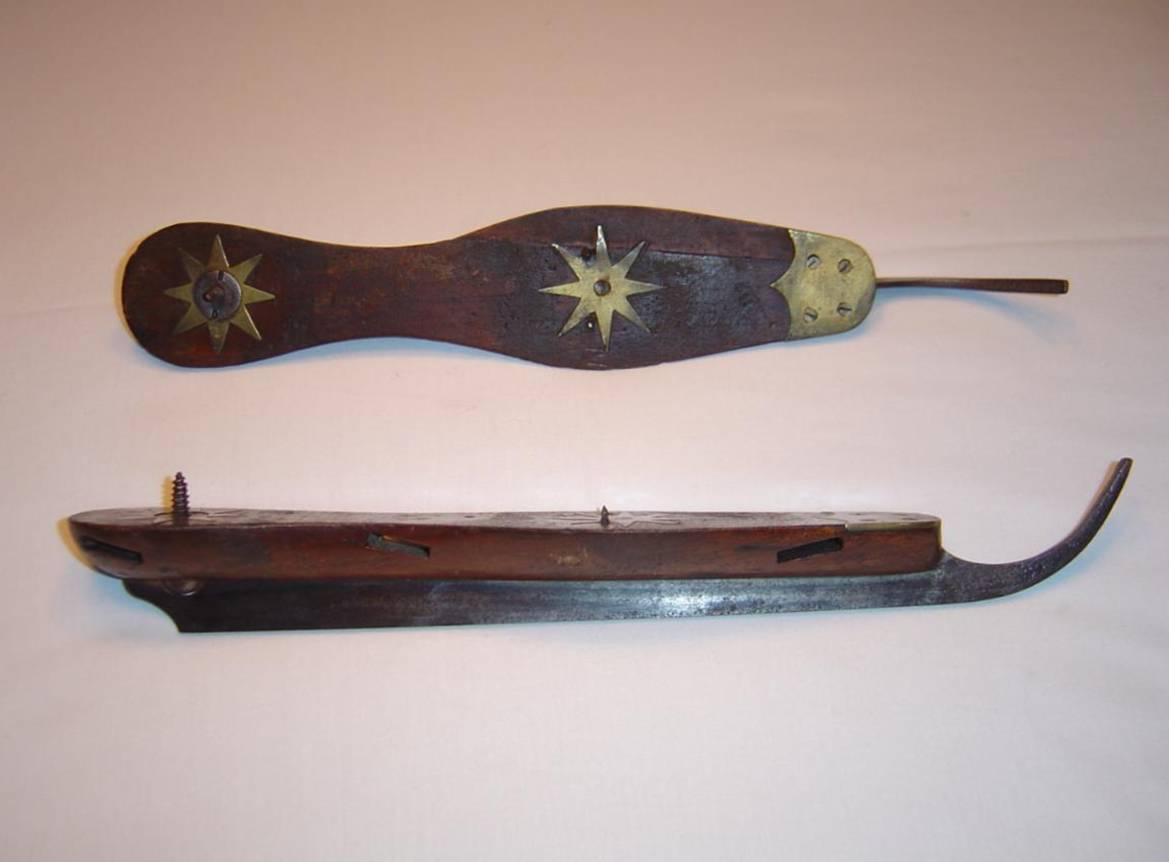
Fen runners

In the Fens, skates were called pattens, fen runners, or Whittlesey runners. The footstock was made of beechwood. A screw at the back was screwed into the heel of the boot, and three small spikes at the front kept the skate steady. There were holes in the footstock for leather straps to fasten it to the foot. The metal blades were slightly higher at the back than the front. In the 1890s, fen skaters started to race in Norwegian style skates.

On Saturday 1 February 1879, a number of professional ice skaters from Cambridgeshire and Huntingdonshire met in the Guildhall, Cambridge, to set up the National Skating Association, the first national ice skating body in the world. The founding committee consisted of several landowners, a vicar, a fellow of Trinity College, a magistrate, two members of parliament, the mayor of Cambridge, the Lord Lieutenant of Cambridge, journalist James Drake Digby, the president of Cambridge University Skating Club, and Neville Goodman, a graduate of Peterhouse, Cambridge (and son of Potto Brown's milling partner, Joseph Goodman). The newly formed Association held their first one-and-a-half-mile British professional championship at Thorney in December 1879.

=== Figure skating ===
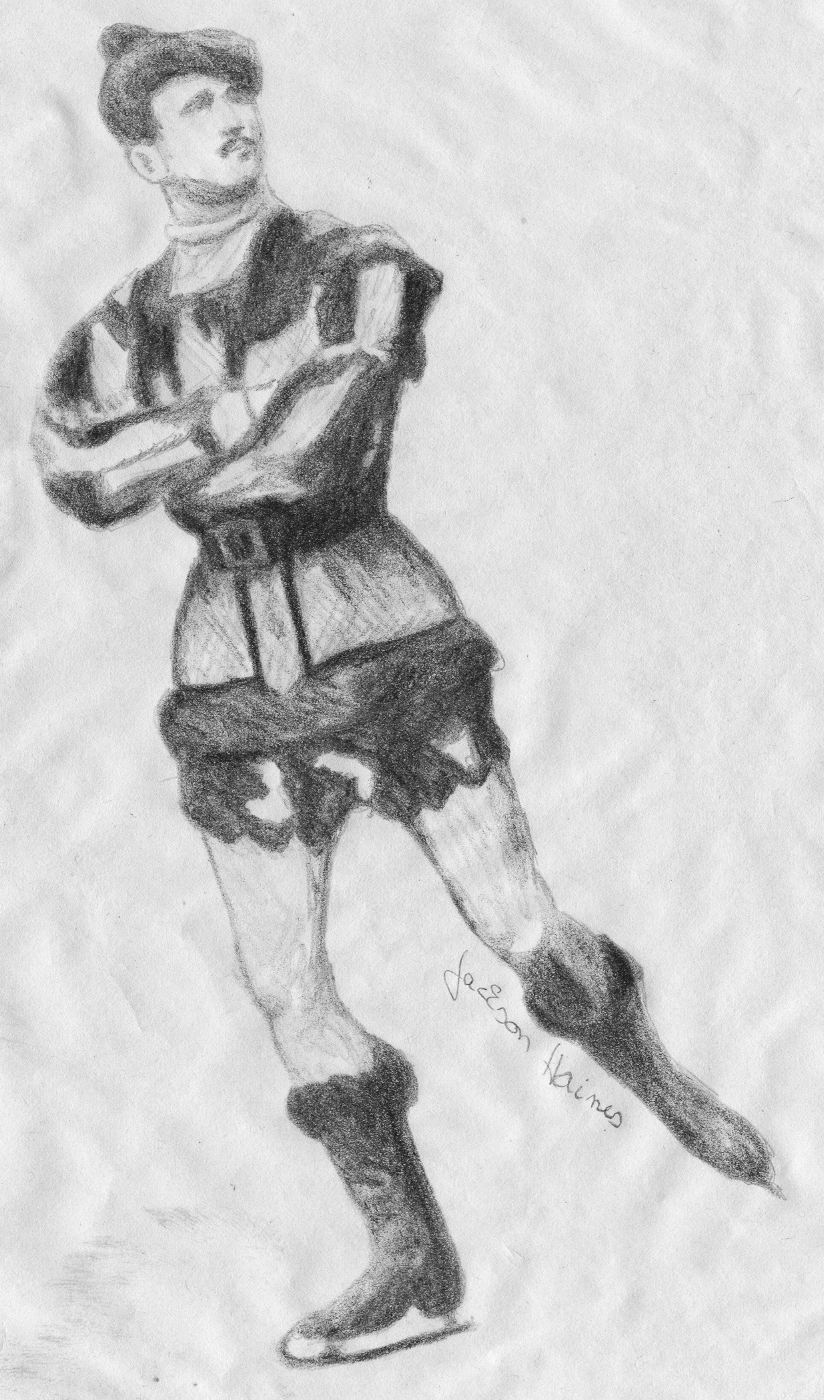
Jackson Haines

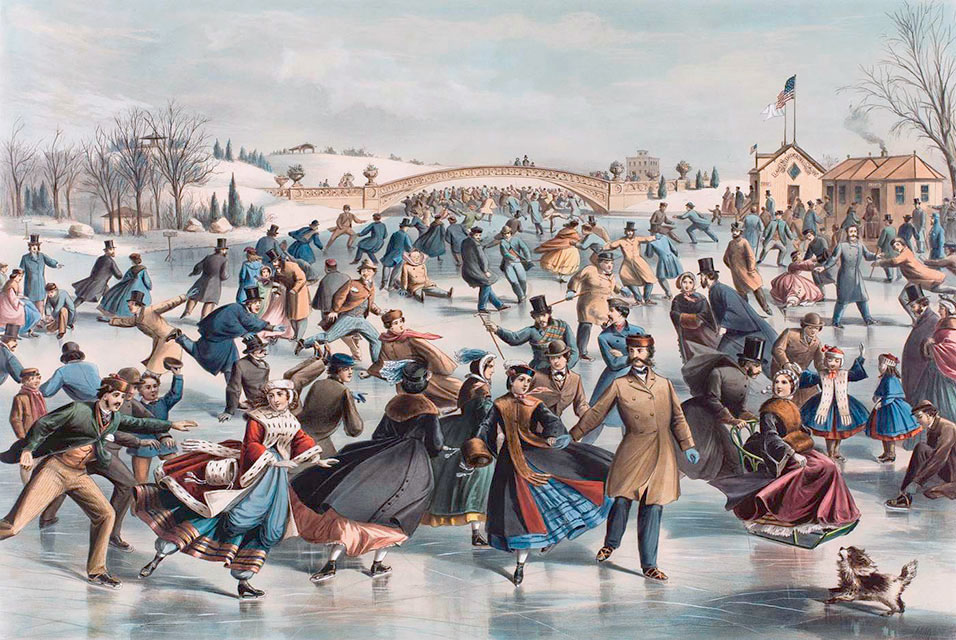
Central Park, Winter – The Skating Pond, 1862 lithograph by Currier and Ives

The first instructional book concerning ice skating was published in London in 1772. The book titled The Art of Figure Skating, written by a British artillery lieutenant, Robert Jones, describes basic figure skating forms such as circles and figure eights. The book was written solely for men, as women did not normally ice skate in the late 18th century. It was with the publication of this manual that ice skating split into its two main disciplines, speed skating and figure skating.

The founder of modern figure skating as it is known today was Jackson Haines, an American. He was the first skater to incorporate ballet and dance movements into his skating, as opposed to focusing on tracing patterns on the ice. Haines also invented the sit spin and developed a shorter, curved blade for figure skating that allowed for easier turns. He was also the first to wear blades that were permanently attached to the boot.

The International Skating Union was founded in 1892 as the first international ice skating organisation in Scheveningen, in the Netherlands. The Union created the first codified set of figure skating rules and governed international competition in speed and figure skating. The first Championship, known as the Championship of the Internationale Eislauf-Vereinigung, was held in Saint Petersburg in 1896. The event had four competitors and was won by Gilbert Fuchs.

== Physical mechanics of skating ==
A skate can glide over ice because there is a layer of ice molecules on the surface that are not as tightly bound as the molecules of the mass of ice beneath. These molecules are in a semiliquid state, providing lubrication. The molecules in this "quasi-fluid" or "water-like" layer are less mobile than liquid water, but are much more mobile than the molecules deeper in the ice. At about −157 °C (−250 °F) the slippery layer is one molecule thick; as the temperature increases the slippery layer becomes thicker.

It had long been believed that ice is slippery because the pressure of an object in contact with it causes a thin layer to melt. The hypothesis was that the blade of an ice skate, exerting pressure on the ice, melts a thin layer, providing lubrication between the ice and the blade. This explanation, called "pressure melting", originated in the 19th century. (See Regelation.) Pressure melting could not account for skating on ice temperatures lower than −3.5 °C, whereas skaters often skate on lower-temperature ice.

In the 20th century, an alternative explanation, called "friction melting", proposed by Lozowski, Szilder, Le Berre, Pomeau, and others showed that because of the viscous frictional heating, a macroscopic layer of melt ice is in-between the ice and the skate. With this they fully explained the low friction with nothing else but macroscopic physics, whereby the frictional heat generated between skate and ice melts a layer of ice. This is a self-stabilizing mechanism of skating. If by fluctuation the friction gets high, the layer grows in thickness and lowers the friction, and if it gets low, the layer decreases in thickness and increases the friction. The friction generated in the sheared layer of water between skate and ice grows as √V with V the velocity of the skater, such that for low velocities the friction is also low.

Whatever the origin of the water layer, skating is more destructive than simply gliding. A skater leaves a visible trail behind on virgin ice and skating rinks have to be regularly resurfaced to improve the skating conditions. It means that the deformation caused by the skate is plastic rather than elastic. The skate ploughs through the ice in particular due to the sharp edges. Van Leeuwen proposed that another component has to be added to the friction: the "ploughing friction". The calculated frictions are of the same order as the measured frictions in real skating in a rink. The ploughing friction decreases with the velocity V, since the pressure in the water layer increases with V and lifts the skate (aquaplaning). As a result the sum of the water-layer friction and the ploughing friction only increases slightly with V, making skating at high speeds (>90 km/h) possible.

== Inherent safety risks ==
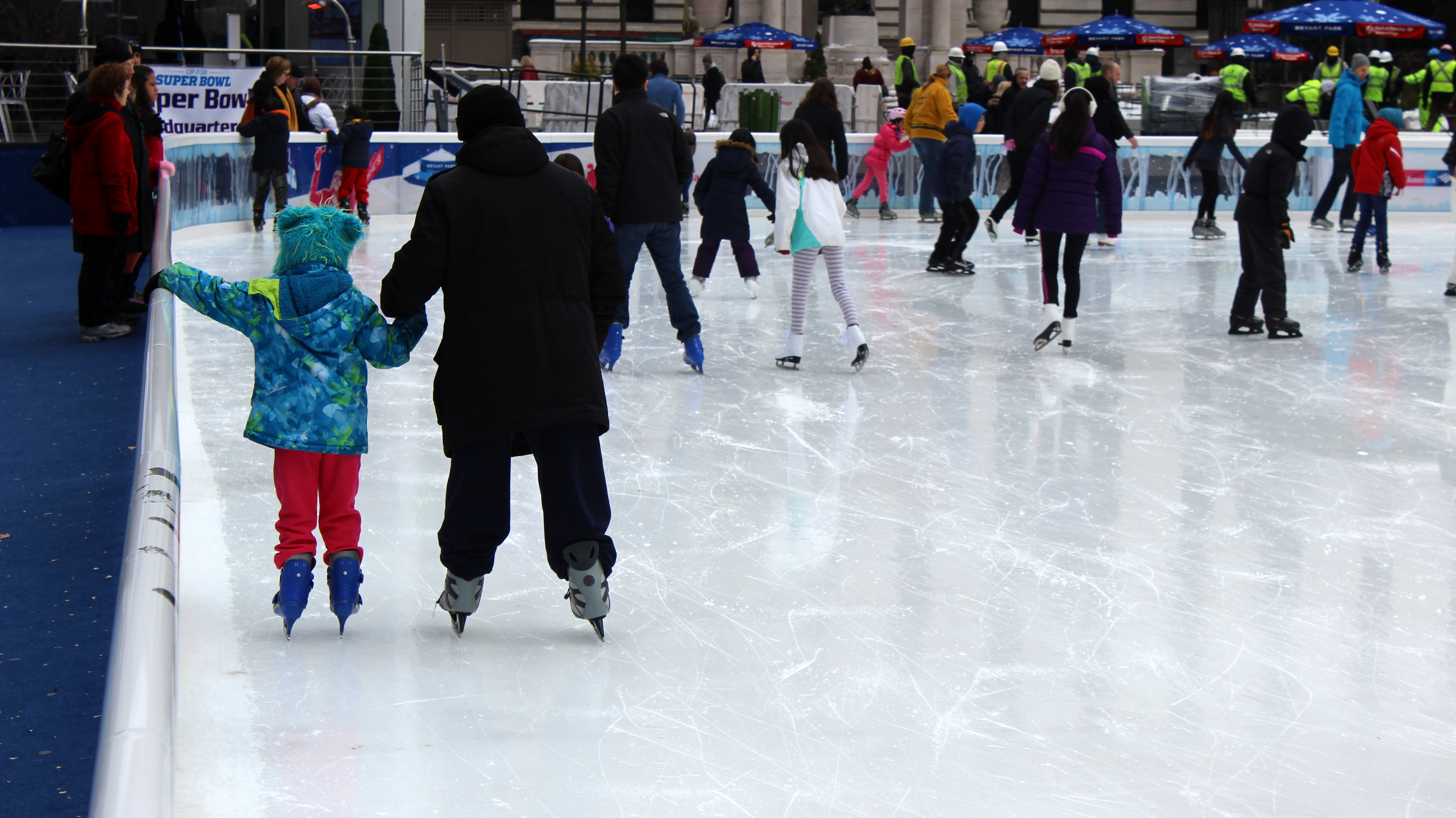
Adult and child ice skating

A person's ability to ice skate depends on the roughness of the ice, the design of the ice skate, and the skill and experience of the skater. While serious injury is rare, a number of short track speed skaters have been paralysed after a heavy fall when they collided with the boarding. A fall can be fatal if a helmet is not worn to protect against severe head injury. Accidents are rare but there is a risk of injury from collisions, particularly during hockey games or in pair skating.

A significant danger when skating outdoors on a frozen body of water is falling through the ice into the freezing water underneath. Death can result from shock, hypothermia, or drowning. It is often difficult or impossible for the skater to climb out of the water, due to the weight of their ice skates and thick winter clothing, and the ice repeatedly breaking as they struggle to get back onto the surface. Also, if the skater becomes disoriented under the water, they might not be able to find the hole in the ice through which they have fallen. Although this can prove fatal, it is also possible for the rapid cooling to produce a condition in which a person can be revived up to hours after falling into the water. Experts have warned not to ice skate alone, and also warned parents not to leave children unattended on a frozen body of water.

== Communal activities on ice ==
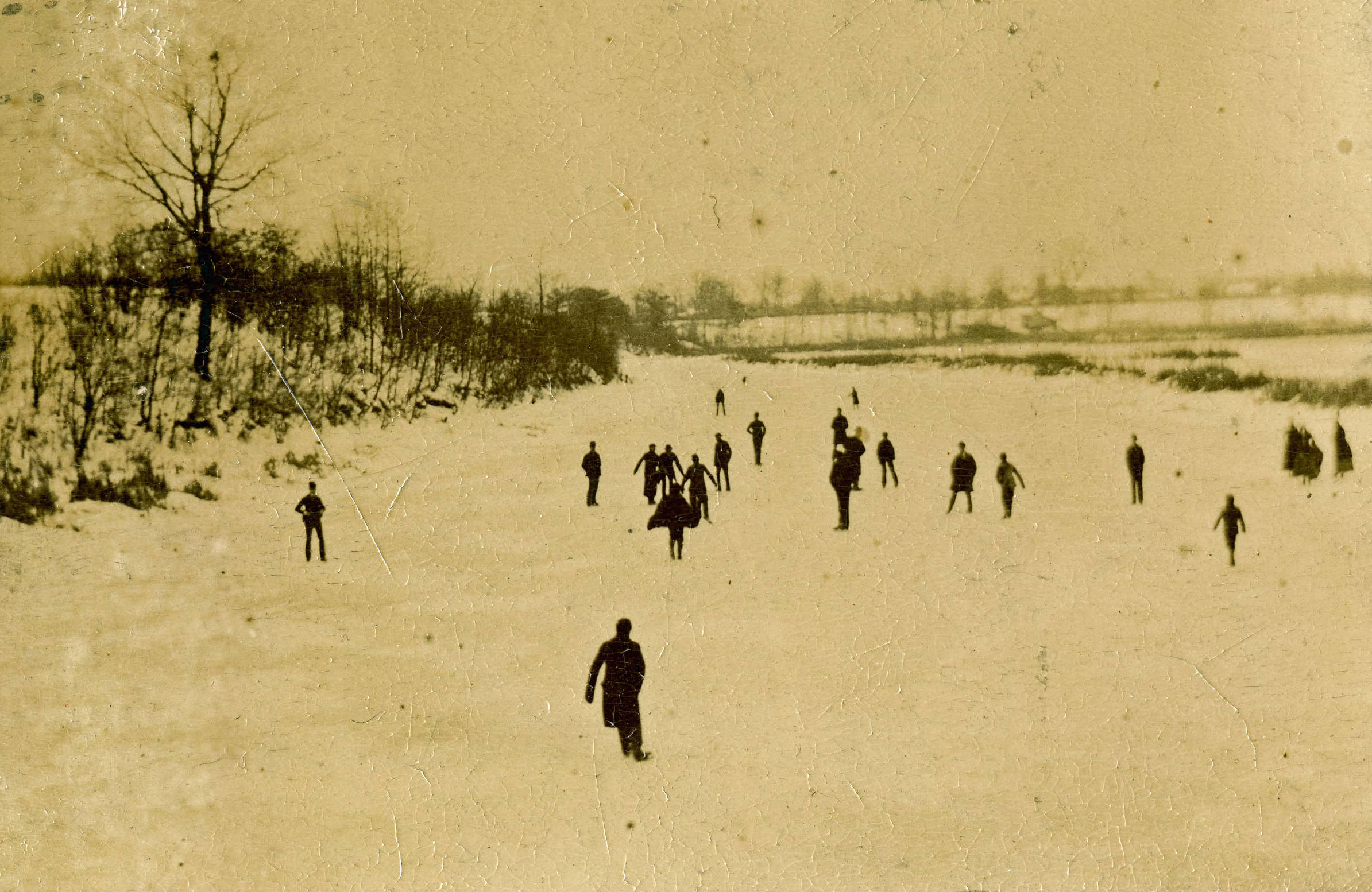
Ice skaters on the Maumee River in Toledo, Ohio, 1890s

A number of recreational and sporting activities take place on ice:

=== Ice skating ===
- Fen skating – a traditional form of ice skating in the Fenland of England which involved skating races and matches held in towns and villages all over the Fens
- Tour skating – recreational and competitive long-distance skating outdoors on open areas of natural ice
- Speed skating – competitive form of ice skating in which contenders race over fixed distances, short track and long track versions
- Barrel jumping – a speed skating discipline in which skaters jump over a length of multiple barrels
- Figure skating – winter sport with multiple disciplines: men's singles, ladies' singles, pair skating, ice dance, and synchronized skating
- Bandy – non-contact team sport similar to ice hockey, but using a bandy ball and played on a large ice field
- Ice hockey – fast-paced contact team sport, using a vulcanized rubber puck, usually played on a special ice hockey rink
- Rink bandy – a form of bandy that can be played on a standard ice hockey rink
- Rinkball – non-contact team sport using a bandy ball with combined elements from bandy and ice hockey
- Ringette – non-contact team sport using a rubber pneumatic ring instead of a ball or puck
- Ice cross downhill – competitive extreme sport featuring downhill skating on a walled track

=== No skating ===
The following sports and games are also played on ice, but players are not required to wear ice skates.

- Ice cricket - a variant of the English game of cricket played in harsh wintry conditions
- Spongee – an outdoor team sport which is a non-contact variant of ice hockey played on outdoor ice hockey rinks
- Broomball – a team sport played on ice hockey rinks using sticks with paddles to propel a ball into the opposing team's net
- Moscow broomball – an outdoor team game played using ice hockey equipment and a ball played at the Russian embassy on frozen outdoor courts flooded with water
- Curling – a team sport using "rocks" and lanes and a target
- Ice stock – a team sport using lanes and a target
- Crokicurl – an outdoor team sport using "rocks" on an octagonal playing area with posts and a target

== Gallery ==
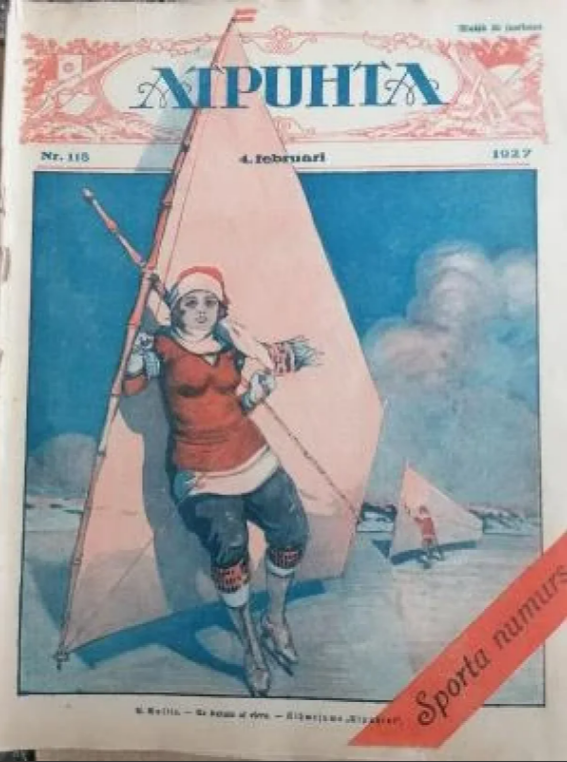
Ice skating with a sail (A. Apsītis, Latvia, 1927)

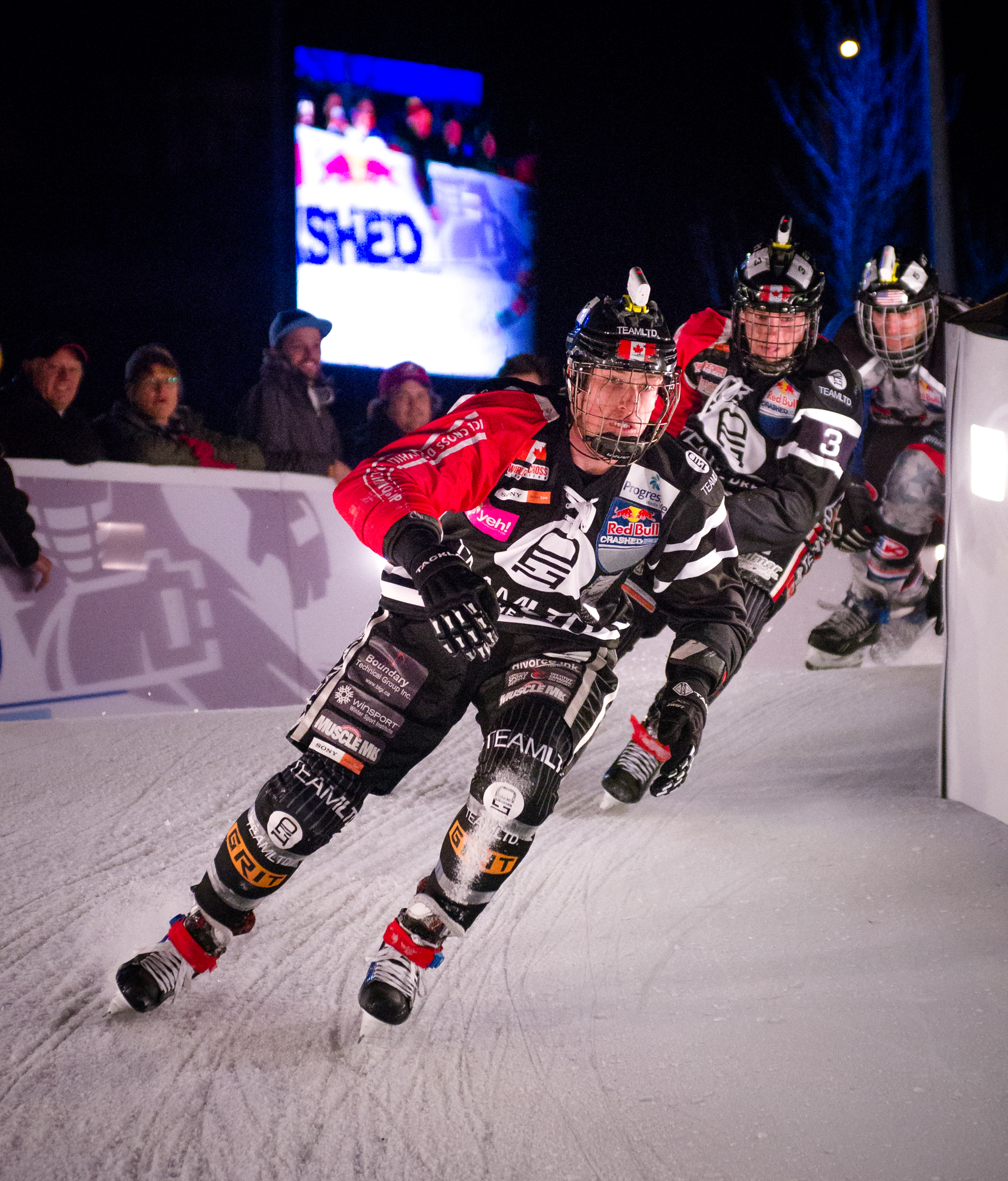
Ice cross downhill
(Individual)

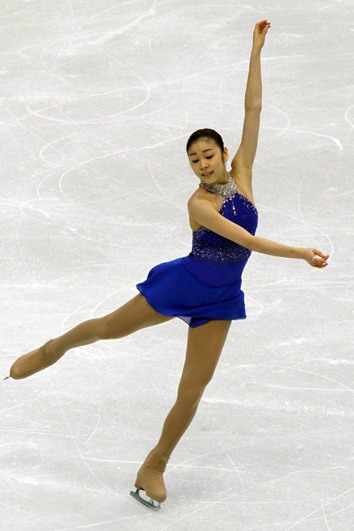
Figure skating
(Individual, Pairs)

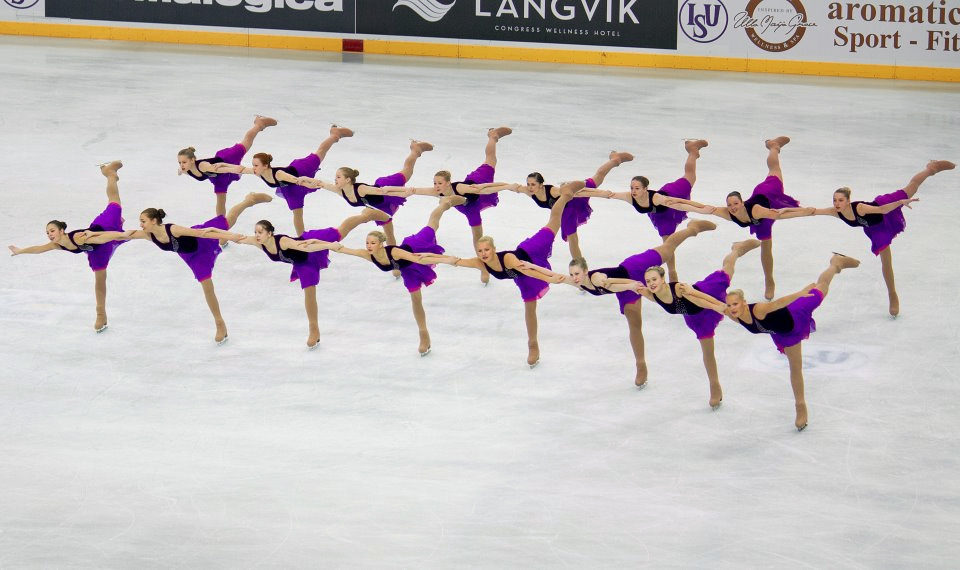
Synchronized skating
(Team)

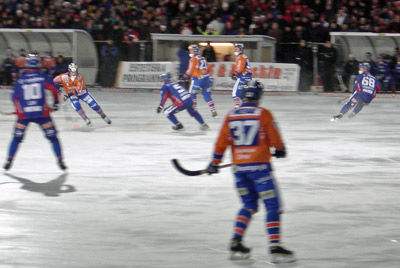
Bandy
(Team)

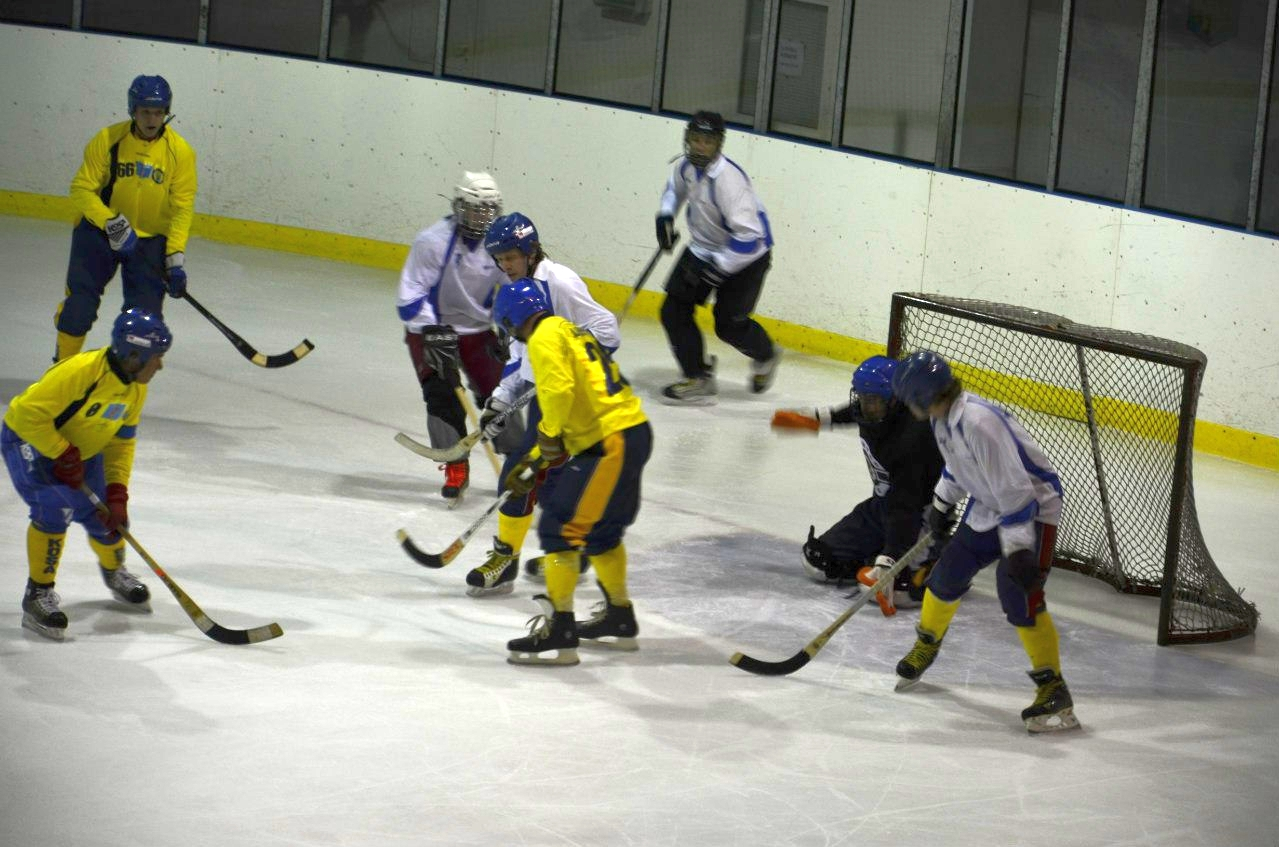
Rink bandy
(Team)

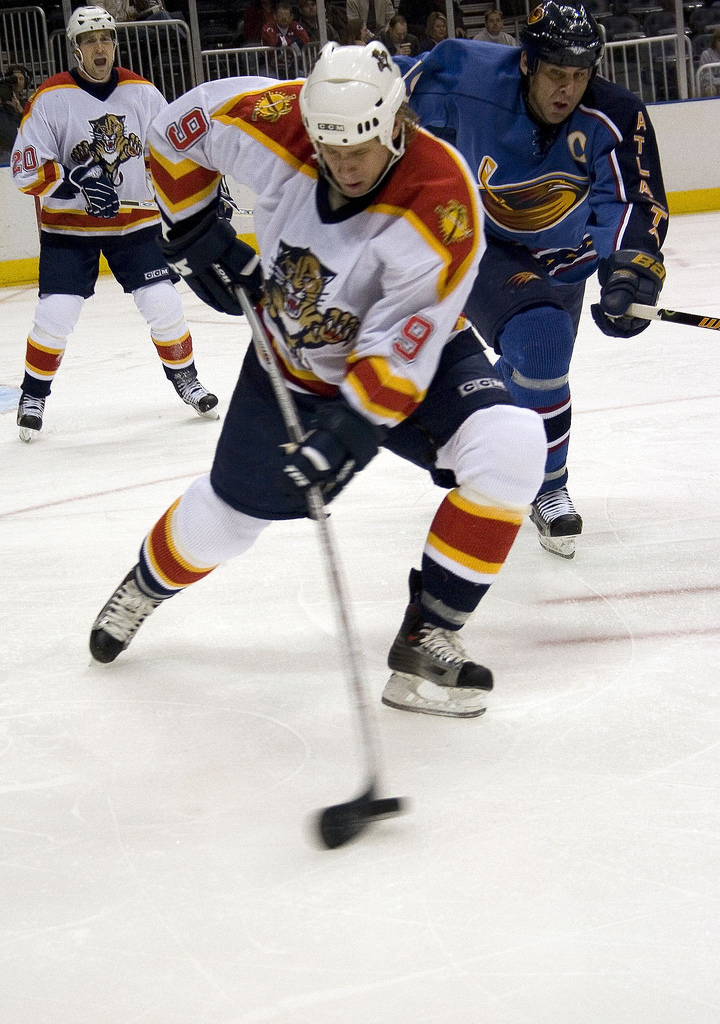
Ice hockey
(Team)

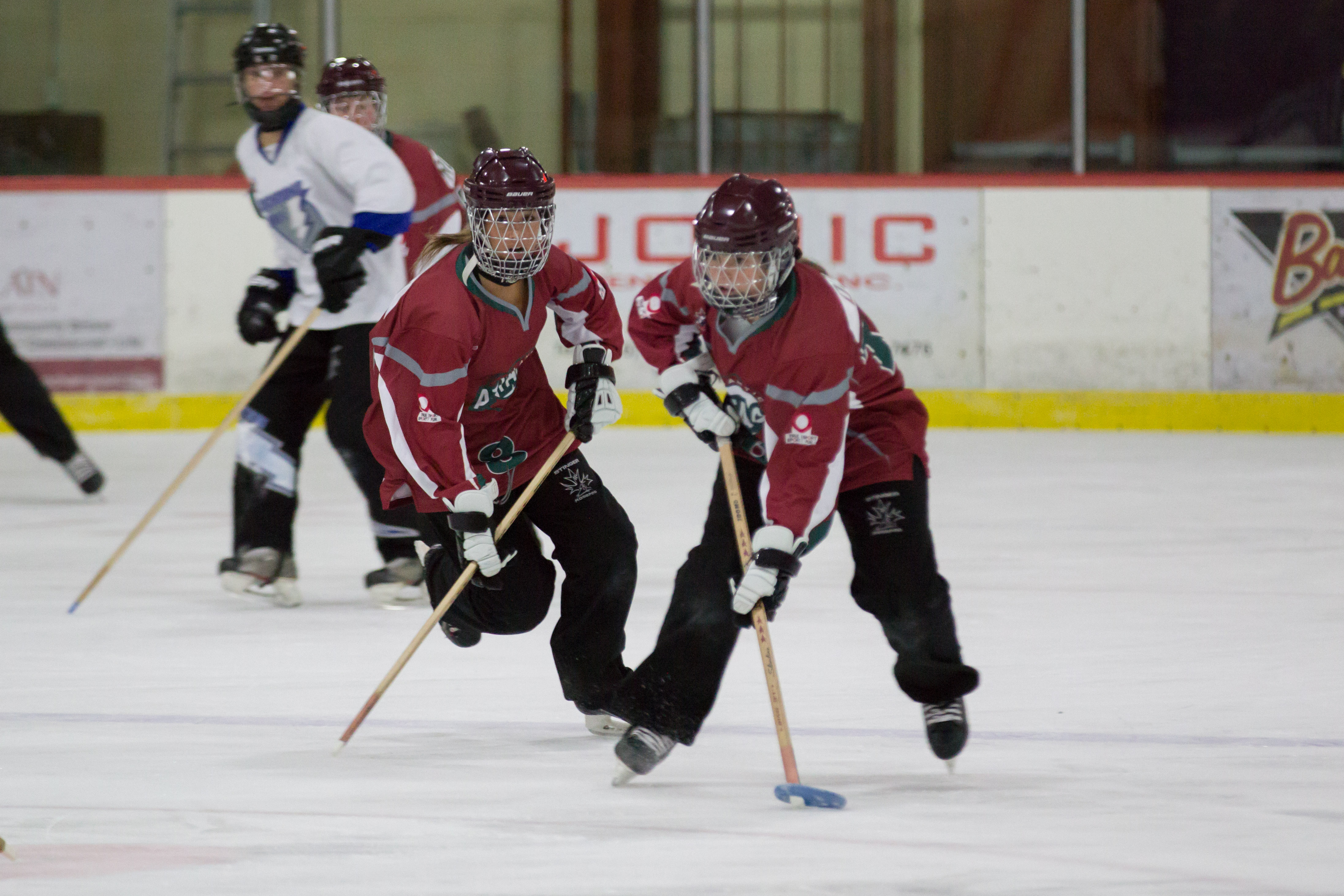
Ringette
(Team)

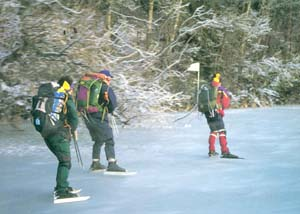
Tour skating
(Individual)

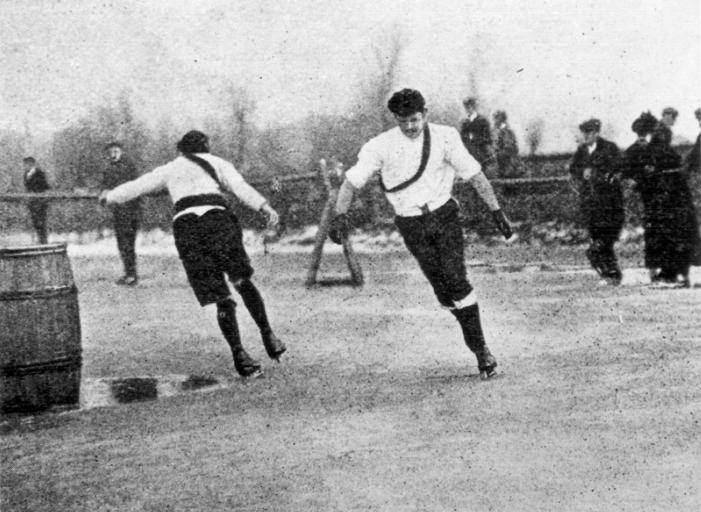
Fen skating
(Individual)

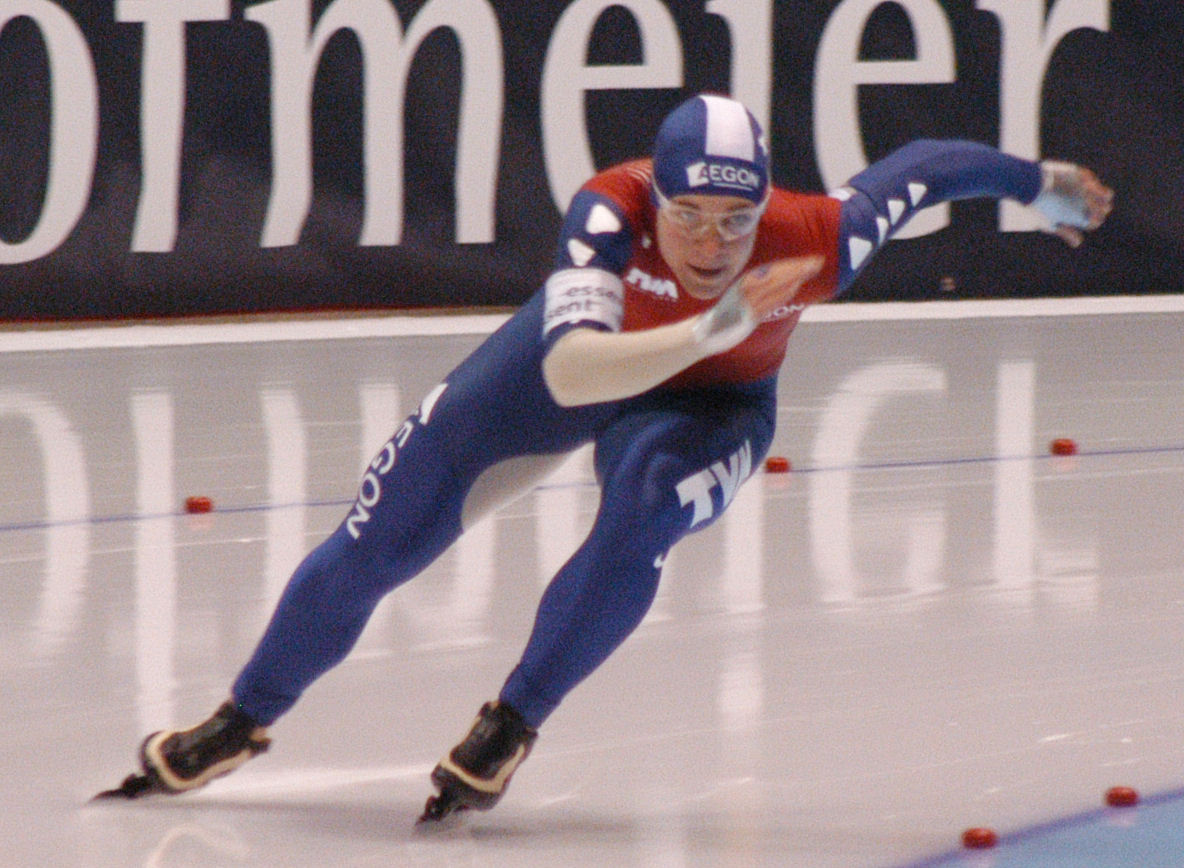
Speed skating
(Individual)

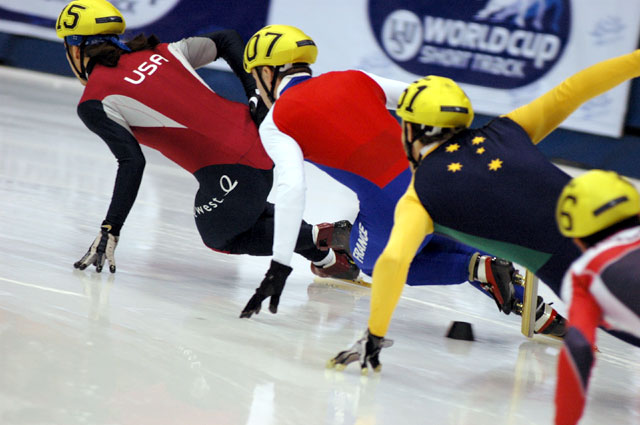
Short track speed skating
(Individual, Team Relay)

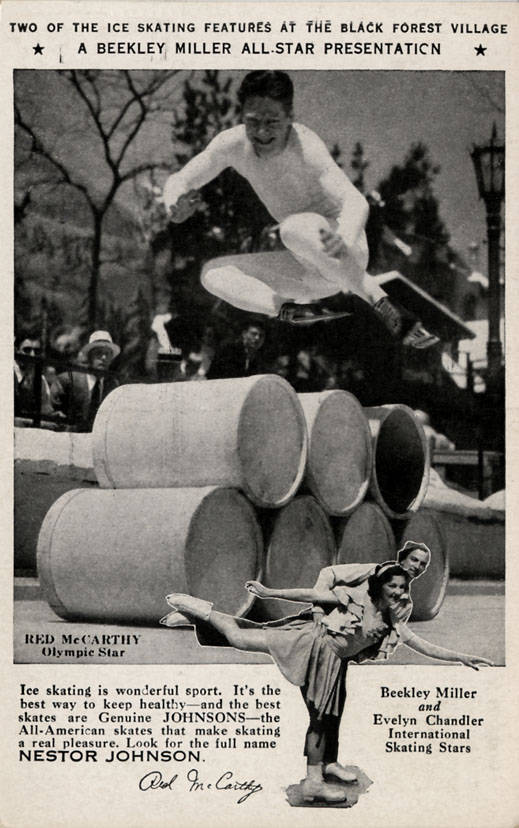
Barrel jumping
(Individual)

=== Videos ===
Ice skater on Lake Neusiedl.

Skating in Central Park (1900), one minute silent film by Frank S. Armitage. EYE Film Institute Netherlands.

Documentary on the World Championship Skating for Women at Helsinki in 1971.

== See also ==
- Fen skating
- Ice resurfacer
- Kite ice skating
- Lidwina, patron saint of ice skaters
