= Robert Walker (minister) =

Church of Scotland minister, died 1808

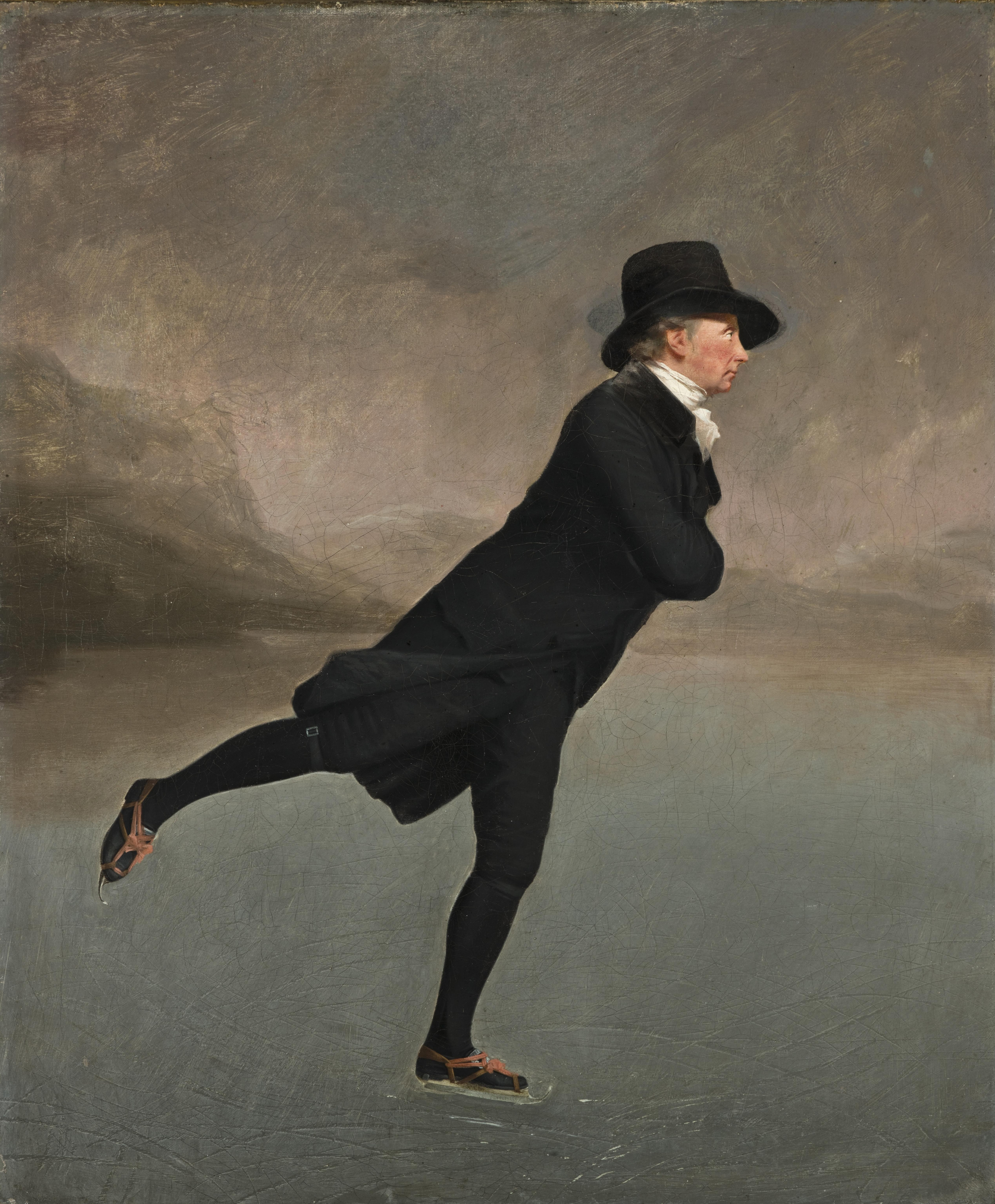
Henry Raeburn, The Reverend Robert Walker Skating on Duddingston Loch, 1790s, National Gallery of Scotland

Robert Walker FRSE (30 April 1755 – 30 June 1808) was a Church of Scotland minister, best known as the subject of the oil painting The Skating Minister by Henry Raeburn.

== Life ==
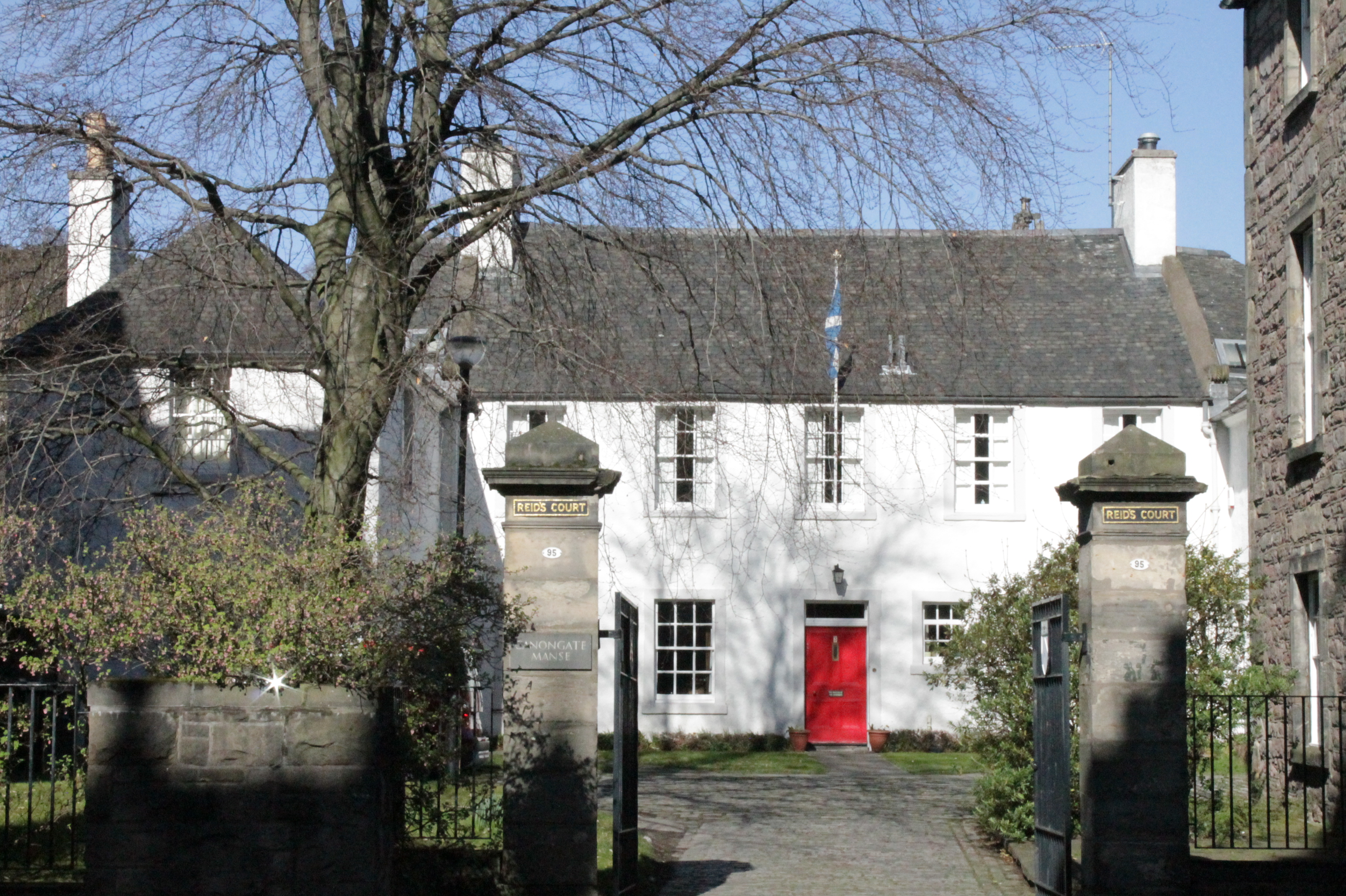
Canongate manse, Edinburgh

Walker was born in Monkton in Ayrshire, the son of William Walker, minister of the Scots Church in Rotterdam.

Many of his male relatives were Church of Scotland ministers: his father was the minister in Monkton; his uncle, also Robert Walker, was minister at St Giles' Cathedral in Edinburgh and Moderator of the General Assembly of the Church of Scotland in 1771; his grandfather had been minister at Canongate Kirk in Edinburgh. His mother was the daughter of a merchant from Virginia. His father became minister of the Scots Church in Rotterdam in 1760, and it is likely that Walker learned to skate on frozen canals in the Netherlands. After his mother's death in the Netherlands, his father remarried in 1767 to the widow of a Scottish merchant in Rotterdam.

Like his father and grandfather, Walker became a Church of Scotland clergyman. He was granted a licence to preach by the Presbytery of Edinburgh on 24 April 1770, shortly before his 15th birthday (some sources give his year of birth as 1746 which would put him at 24, a more normal age for ordination). Willielma Campbell, Lady Glenorchy, presented him as minister of Cramond, near Edinburgh, in November 1776. He moved to become senior minister at Canongate Kirk in Edinburgh on 19 August 1784, a parish that includes the Palace of Holyroodhouse, bringing him to the centre of the Scottish establishment. He remained minister at Canongate until his death in the manse, on 30 June 1808. Raeburn was appointed as one of the nine trustees of his will, along with Charles Hamilton, 8th Earl of Haddington, and Walker's publisher, William Creech.

He became a member of the Royal Company of Archers in 1779, and was appointed chaplain of the Company in 1798. He was elected as a member of the Royal Society of Edinburgh in 1784, and served as chaplain of the Edinburgh Chamber of Commerce from 1794 to 1807.

In 1791 he published a collection of his sermons in 1791 and in 1794 he published a book on the Psalms of David and also a book of observations on the Dutch.

He died in Edinburgh on 30 June 1808.

== The painting ==
He became a member of Edinburgh Skating Club in 1780. The club met on Duddingston Loch, near Edinburgh, as depicted in The Skating Minister by Raeburn. The painting is thought to have been made in about 1795, after Raeburn returned from a visit to Rome in 1786. The picture remained in the possession of Walker's descendants and virtually unknown for almost 150 years. Having failed to sell the painting at auction in 1914, Walker's great-granddaughter, Beatrix Scott, sold The Skating Minister privately in 1926. It was acquired by the National Gallery of Scotland at a Christie's auction in 1949 for £525.

== Family ==
In May 1778 Walker married Jean Fraser, daughter of John Fraser, a lawyer. They had two daughters and three sons together: Magdalene (b.1779) married Richard Scougal of Leith in 1800, Jane (b.1781) married James Thomson of Leith, John (b.1784) and William (1786–1787) and Robert (b.1788).

== Publications ==
- Observations on the National Character of the Dutch (1794)
- The Psalms of David Methodized (1794)
- Golf, a Dutch Game (dnk)
