= Robin Walker (disambiguation) =

Robin Walker (born 1978) is a British politician.

Robin Walker may also refer to:

- Robin Walker (game designer), creator of the Team Fortress series of computer games
- Robin Walker, Irish architect, best known for his work with firm Scott Tallon Walker

== See also ==
- Rob Walker (disambiguation)
