= Duddingston Loch Hoard =

Scottish archeological collection

The Duddingston Loch Hoard, currently held by National Museums Scotland (NMS), comprises Late Bronze Age weapons and other objects which were found in Duddingston Loch in Edinburgh when workers were dredging for marl in 1778. The bronze objects were found along with human bones and animal horns.

== History ==
The hoard was originally dispersed between King George III, Sir Alexander Dick, who owned the loch, Sir Walter Scott, and the Museum of the Society of Antiquaries of Scotland (now NMS). The donation to the Museum of the Society of Antiquaries of Scotland included spearheads, swords, a rapier, and a bucket handle. More swords and one further spearhead were acquired by the museum in 1935. These had been in the collection of Sir Walter Scott. The spearheads and swords are broken and/or bent, and some have been burnt and partially melted. Types include Ewart Park swords, plain and lunate spearheads, barbed and lunate spearheads, and a ring with staple from a bucket. The hoard dates to around 1000–800 BC. A Scottish parallel for the treatment of the metalwork at Duddingston Loch is found in the Peelhill Hoard from South Lanarkshire, in the collections of Glasgow Museums.

=== Research ===
Research is ongoing regarding why the bronze objects from Duddingston Loch were treated in such a way as to render them unusable, looking at why these particular types of objects were selected for deposition in the loch, and questioning the motivation for this.

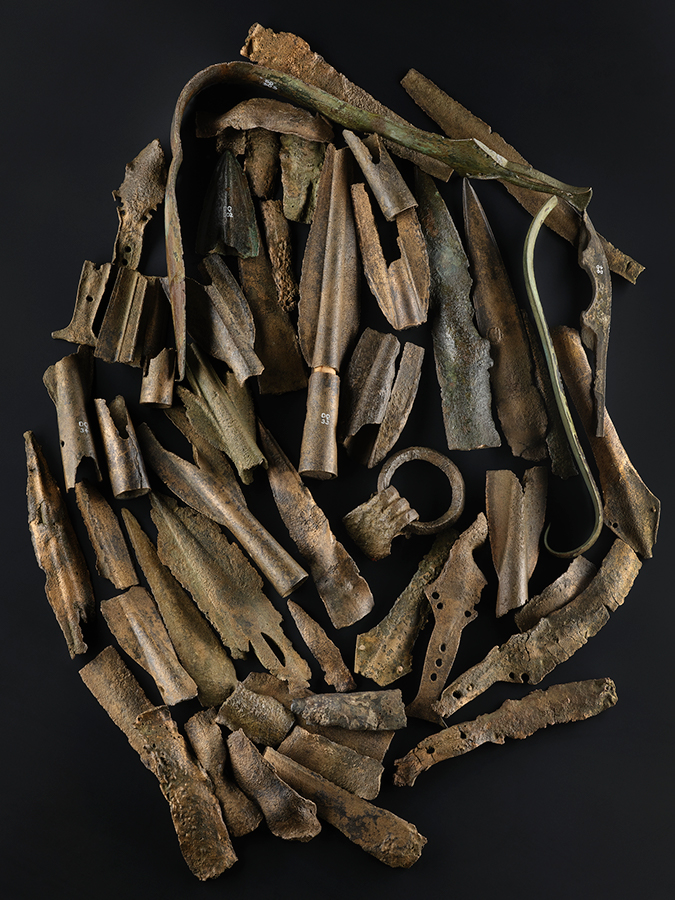
The Late Bronze Age Hoard from Duddingston Loch, Edinburgh

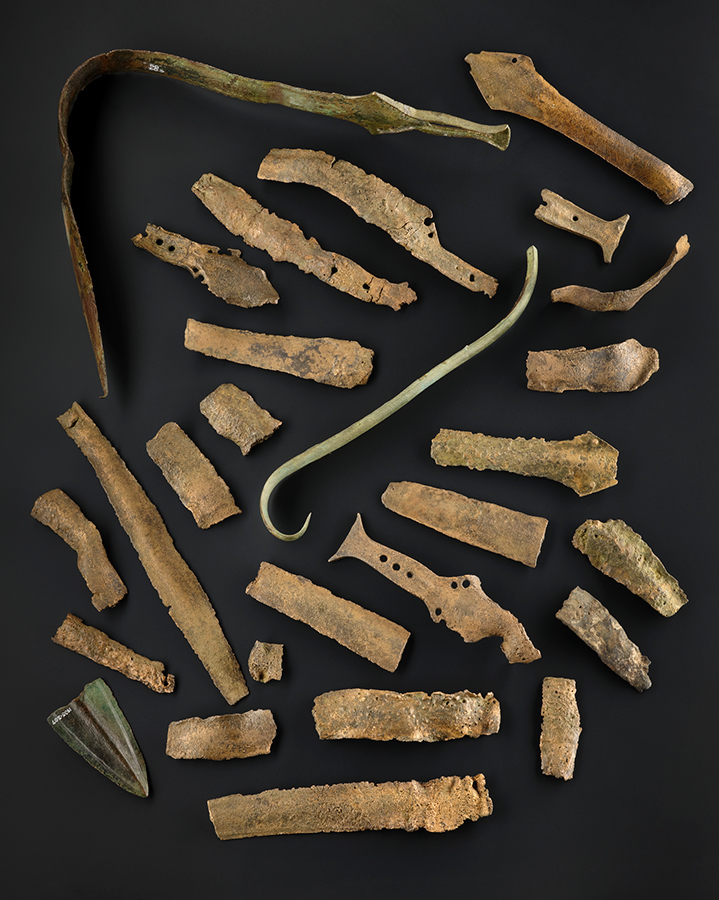
A selection of objects from the Late Bronze Age Hoard from Duddingston Loch, Edinburgh

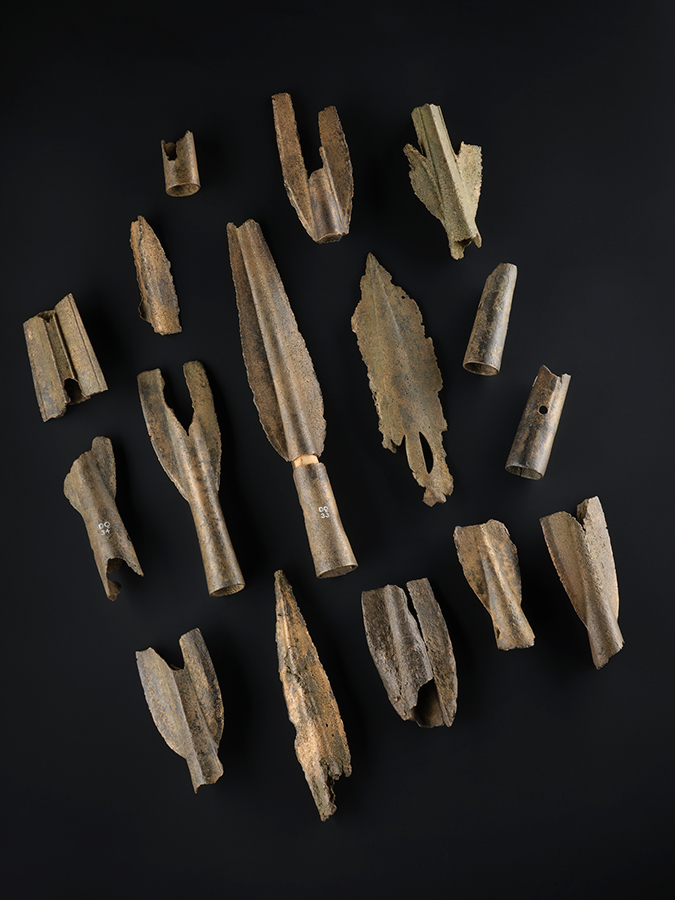
Spearheads and spearhead fragments from the Late Bronze Age Hoard from Duddingston Loch, Edinburgh

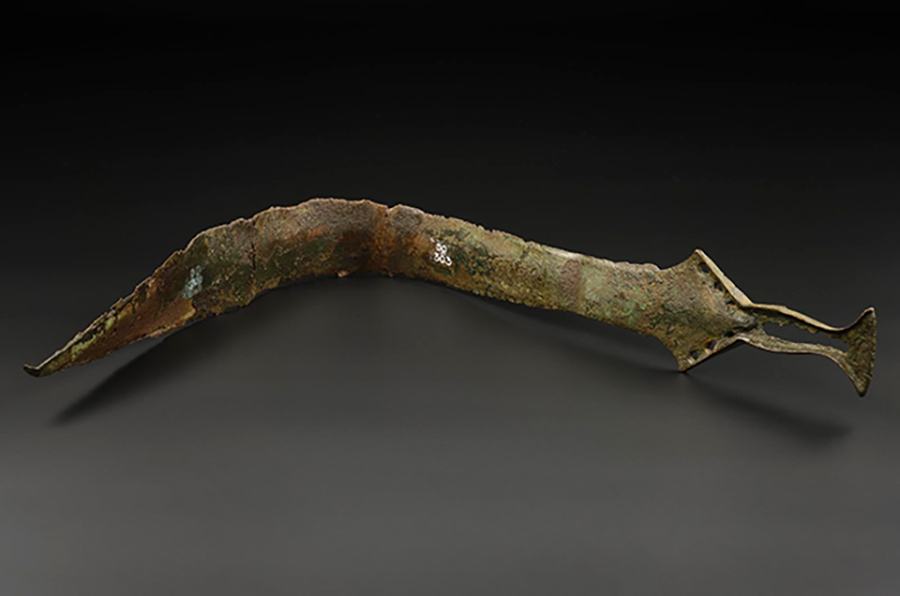
A damaged sword from the Late Bronze Age Hoard from Duddingston Loch, Edinburgh
