= Rob Walker =

Rob Walker may refer to:

- Rob Walker (journalist) (born 1968), American journalist and author
- Rob Walker (New York politician) (born 1974/1975), former State Assemblyman for New York and Current Chief Deputy County Executive of Nassau County, NY
- Rob Walker (motorsport) (1917–2002), motor racing team principal and journalist
- Rob Walker (born 1979), Creative Content Officer for Channel Awesome
- Rob Walker (poet) (born 1953), Australian poet
- Rob Walker (sports announcer) (born 1975), master of ceremonies for snooker tournaments

== See also ==
- Robert Walker (disambiguation)
- Robin Walker (disambiguation)
