= The Skating Minister =

1790s painting by Henry Raeburn

The Reverend Robert Walker Skating on Duddingston Loch
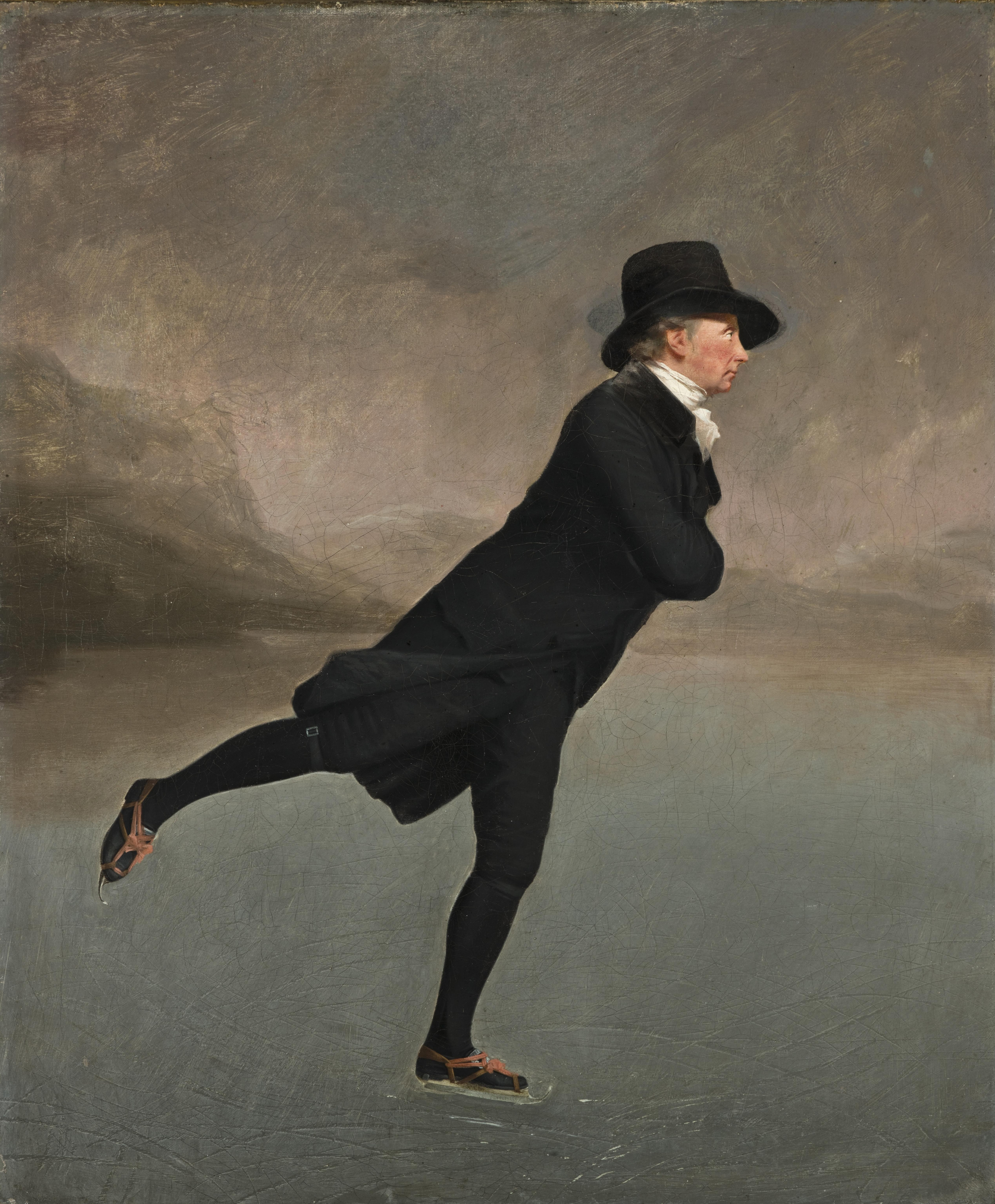
- Artist: Henry Raeburn
- Year: 1790s
- Medium: Oil on canvas
- Subject: Reverend Robert Walker
- Dimensions: 76 cm × 64 cm (30 in × 25 in)
- Location: National Gallery of Scotland

The Reverend Robert Walker Skating on Duddingston Loch, better known by its shorter title The Skating Minister, is a late 18th-century oil painting attributed to Henry Raeburn, now in the Scottish National Gallery in Edinburgh. Because the painting was passed down through the subject's family, it was practically unknown until 1949, but has since become one of Scotland's best-known paintings. It is considered an icon of Scottish culture, painted during the Scottish Enlightenment.

== History ==
Raeburn painted this portrait of his friend Robert Walker in about 1795, when he was already a fashionable society portraitist in Edinburgh. When Walker died in 1808, Raeburn was one the trustees of his estate. The painting was inherited by Walker's widow Jean, and when she died in 1831, it was passed down to their daughter, Magdalen, and then to her daughter, Magdalen Scougall. Finally it passed in turn to the younger Magdalen's daughter and Walker's great-granddaughter, Beatrix Scott, who lived in Boscombe, Hampshire. In March 1914, Beatrix submitted the painting for auction hoping that it would make 1,000 guineas (£1,050), but it failed to find a buyer. In 1926, Beatrix sold the painting privately for £700 to Lucy Hume of Bournemouth, who in 1949 sent it for sale at Christie's in London. In all these various changes of ownership, there is no record of the painting coming to the attention of any art historian and it is not described in any of the early books on Raeburn's work.

Christie's photographed The Skating Minister for their sale catalogue, which is believed to be the first time that the painting had been reproduced. It came to the attention of Ellis Waterhouse, the director of the National Gallery of Scotland (NGS) and was acquired for the nation for £525. The work did not become famous immediately, and it was not included in a book published by the NGS in 1972, Pictures for Scotland, which showcased the most notable works in their collection. However, in 1973, it was reproduced as one of the 'British Painters' set of commemorative stamps to mark the 150th anniversary of Raeburn's death. The painting was included in a 1997 exhibition of Raeburn's work at the National Portrait Gallery, London and was chosen to appear on posters advertising the event which were put on display across the capital. It reached an even wider audience in 1998 when The Skating Minister was included in an exhibition of British paintings, Pintura británica, at the Museo del Prado in Madrid, where images of it were widely reproduced on souvenirs.

== Robert Walker ==
The minister portrayed in this painting is the Reverend Robert Walker. He was a Church of Scotland minister who was born on 30 April 1755 in Monkton, Ayrshire. When Walker was a child, his father had been the minister of the Scots Kirk in Rotterdam, so the young Robert almost certainly learnt to skate on the frozen canals of the Netherlands. He was licensed by the Presbytery of Edinburgh in 1770 at the age of fifteen. He married Jean Fraser in 1778 and had five children. He became a member of the Royal Company of Archers in 1779 and their chaplain in 1798. He died in 1808.

He was minister of the Canongate Kirk as well as being a member of the Edinburgh Skating Club, the first figure skating club formed anywhere in the world. The club met on Duddingston Loch as shown in the painting or on Lochend Loch about 1.4 miles (2.3 km) to the north, when these lochs were suitably frozen.

== Appraisal ==
The painting is unusual in both its composition and its setting; it is unlike any other portrait by Raeburn. The subject matter, perhaps intentionally conveying Walker's ties with Holland, is reminiscent of seventeenth-century Dutch artworks, particularly those of Hendrick Avercamp. The Reverend skates in the efficient but difficult "travelling position", with both arms folded across his chest, and his stern black outfit contrasts with the wild backdrop of Duddingston Loch. According to Andrew Graham-Dixon, "The pinkish grey crags and sky have been painted with great freedom, whereas the figure of Reverend Robert Walker himself is so tightly drawn and painted that he appears almost as a black silhouette against an icy, vaporous wilderness. Perhaps this was the artist's way of suggesting that, for all his apparent probity and self-restraint, the minister was at heart something of a romantic – a man, at any rate, with a penchant for communing with nature."

Art historian Duncan Thomson notes that, "The filigree within the buckle on the strap at the skater's right knee and the taut complexities of the arrangement of the pink ribbons that binds the skates to his shoes are a reminder of the manipulative skills that Raeburn must have developed during his apprenticeship [as a jeweller and goldsmith] ... perhaps the tour de force of observation and the finding of equivalent forms are the marks that the skater (or those who have circled with him) has made on the ice: the curving grooves incised with some appropriate tool in a liquid, greyish white which has been spread over a darker grey that has been allowed to dry and the edges of these tiny furrows, more pronounced towards the bottom of the picture, tipped in with a purer white to simulate the froth of ice thrown aside by the cutting blade."

== Attribution controversy ==
In March 2005, a curator from the Scottish National Portrait Gallery suggested that the painting was by French artist Henri-Pierre Danloux rather than by Henry Raeburn. Once this information had been brought to the attention of the Gallery, the label on the painting was altered to read “Recent research has suggested that the picture was actually painted [...] by Henri-Pierre Danloux.” Since this time, many people have debated this idea. It has been argued that Danloux was in Edinburgh during the 1790s, which happens to be the time period when The Skating Minister was created. Supposedly the canvas and scale of the painting appear to be those of a French painter, although Raeburn critics argue otherwise.

Despite continuing controversy about its attribution, The Skating Minister was sent to New York City in 2005 to be exhibited in Christie's for Tartan Day, an important Scottish celebration. James Holloway, director of the Scottish National Portrait Gallery, told The Scotsman newspaper that his "gut reaction" was that it is by Raeburn. The newspaper reported that "it is understood that Sir Timothy Clifford, director-general of the National Galleries of Scotland, now accepts the painting is a Raeburn."

== In popular culture ==
Cambridge UK based musical group Clean Bandit based a character in their music video for their song "Dust Clears" on The Skating Minister painting. The video has been posted by the band on YouTube. The skating minister is portrayed by skater Nick Martin and the skating scenes were filmed on Lake Vattern in Sweden.

A copy of The Skating Minister can be seen displayed in the apartment of con-man Neal Caffrey in the USA television series White Collar.

In Alexander McCall Smith's novel The Sunday Philosophy Club, a character sends a card bearing Raeburn's picture to the protagonist, Isabel Dalhousie.

Spanish architect Enric Miralles said that his west window panels at the 2004 Scottish Parliament Building invoked the form of The Skating Minister.

The painting is the subject of the 2022 novel The Edinburgh Skating Club by Michelle Sloan, which focuses on the attribution controversy surrounding the work.

in 2026, the artist Greg Mitchell created a painting showing footballer Scott McTominay's overhead kick in the football match against Denmark, using The Skating Minister as his inspiration, and entitling the new work "The Celebrant".

== See also ==
- The Skater, 1782 painting by Gilbert Stuart
- 100 Great Paintings, 1980 BBC series
