= Duddingston Loch =

Lake in Edinburgh, Scotland

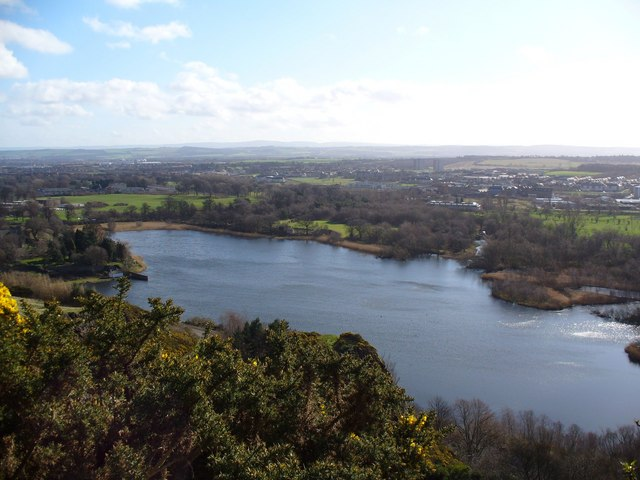
- View of the loch

- Location within Edinburgh
- Location: Edinburgh
- Coordinates: 55.94°N 3.15°W
- Type: Freshwater pond
- Primary outflows: Braid Burn
- Catchment area: Arthur's Seat
- Basin countries: Scotland
- Max. length: 555 m (1,821 ft)
- Max. width: 285 m (935 ft)
- Max. depth: 3 m (10 ft)
- Islands: several islets

Duddingston Loch is a lake, or freshwater loch, in Edinburgh. It is one of the last two remaining natural lochs within the city, the other being Lochend Loch. It is situated to the south of Holyrood Park and lies southwest of the village of Duddingston.

== Location ==
Duddingston Loch is on the southern side of Holyrood Park, to the south of Arthur's Seat. It is the largest and the only natural loch of the three lochs within the Park. The loch has an area of eight hectares (20 acres) and a maximum depth of three metres (ten feet).

== History ==
A Scene (with skaters) on Duddingston Loch, 1853, by Charles Lees

Around three thousand years ago, in the Bronze Age a hoard of weapons, such as swords and spears, as well as other artefacts was deliberately destroyed before being deposited in the waters of Duddingston Loch. These artefacts remained at the bottom of the loch until a dredger dragged them up from the loch bed in 1778. The Duddingston Loch Hoard is displayed in the Early People gallery at the National Museum of Scotland.

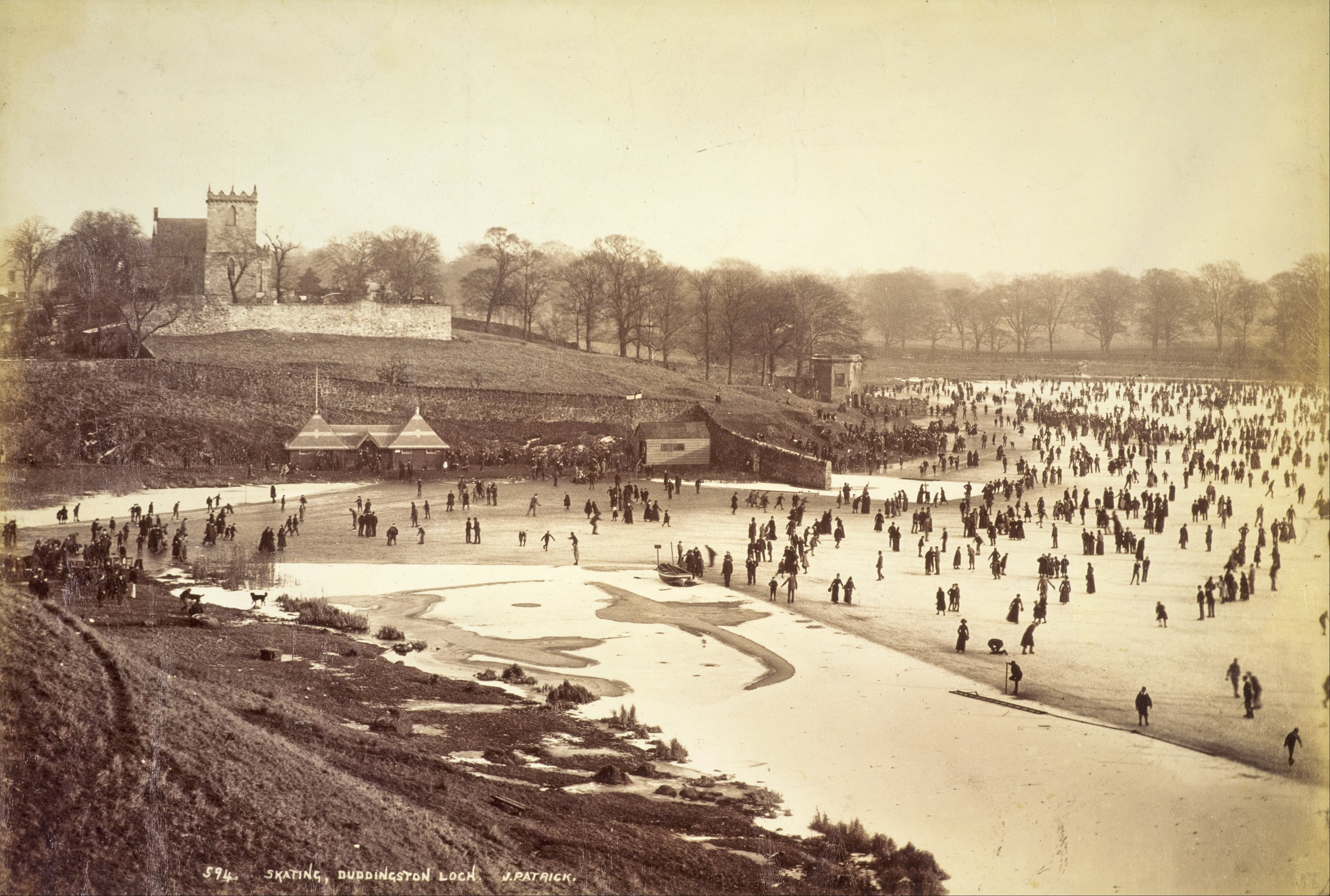
Skating on Duddingston Loch, 1900

Henry Raeburn's famous painting The Skating Minister is set on Duddingston Loch. The loch used to be a popular venue for skaters, with the Edinburgh Skating Club meeting there, but is now rarely sufficiently iced.

The loch was also important in the development of the sport of Curling. Duddingston Curling Society was constituted on 24 January 1795, but with records of curling on the loch dating from at least 1761. Thomson's Tower, designed by William Henry Playfair in 1824, served the society and still stands on the north side of the loch. The Society was wound up after the winter of 1854/55 when the remaining members merged with the Coates Curling Club. A new Duddingston Curling Society was created from 1894/95.

== Fishing ==
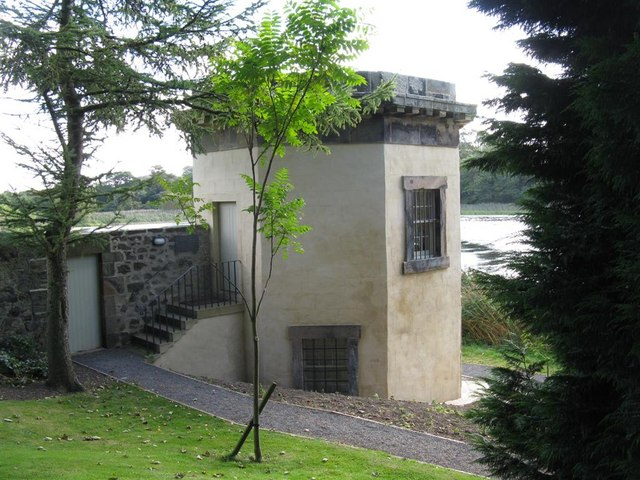
Thomson's Tower, Duddingston

Fishing is permitted in Duddingston Loch, mainly coarse fishing, and free permits can be obtained from the Holyrood Park Ranger Service. Fishing is only permitted from the north shore and any fish caught must be released back into the loch. The main species fished for are common carp, perch and roach. There are also pike in the loch.

== Wildlife ==
Duddingston Loch has been a bird sanctuary since 1925. The Scottish Wildlife Trust also have a wildlife reserve at Bawsinch on the southern shore of the loch which has an area of 26 hectares (64 acres). As well as open water, scrub, and woodland the loch has the most extensive bed of common reed Phragmites australis in the Lothians. The mammals seen around Duddingston Loch include otter, hedgehog and water vole.

The loch is well known for its birds. The western end of the loch is the location of the largest heronry in the Lothians which had 27 nests in 2017. Other breeding species include Canada goose, mute swan, tufted duck, great crested grebe, sparrowhawk, sedge warbler and reed bunting. Non-breeding visitors to the loch include a number of other species of wildfowl as well as records of rarer species such as smew, ring-necked duck, ruddy duck and Great bittern.

== See also ==
- Lost lochs in Edinburgh
