= Edinburgh Skating Club =

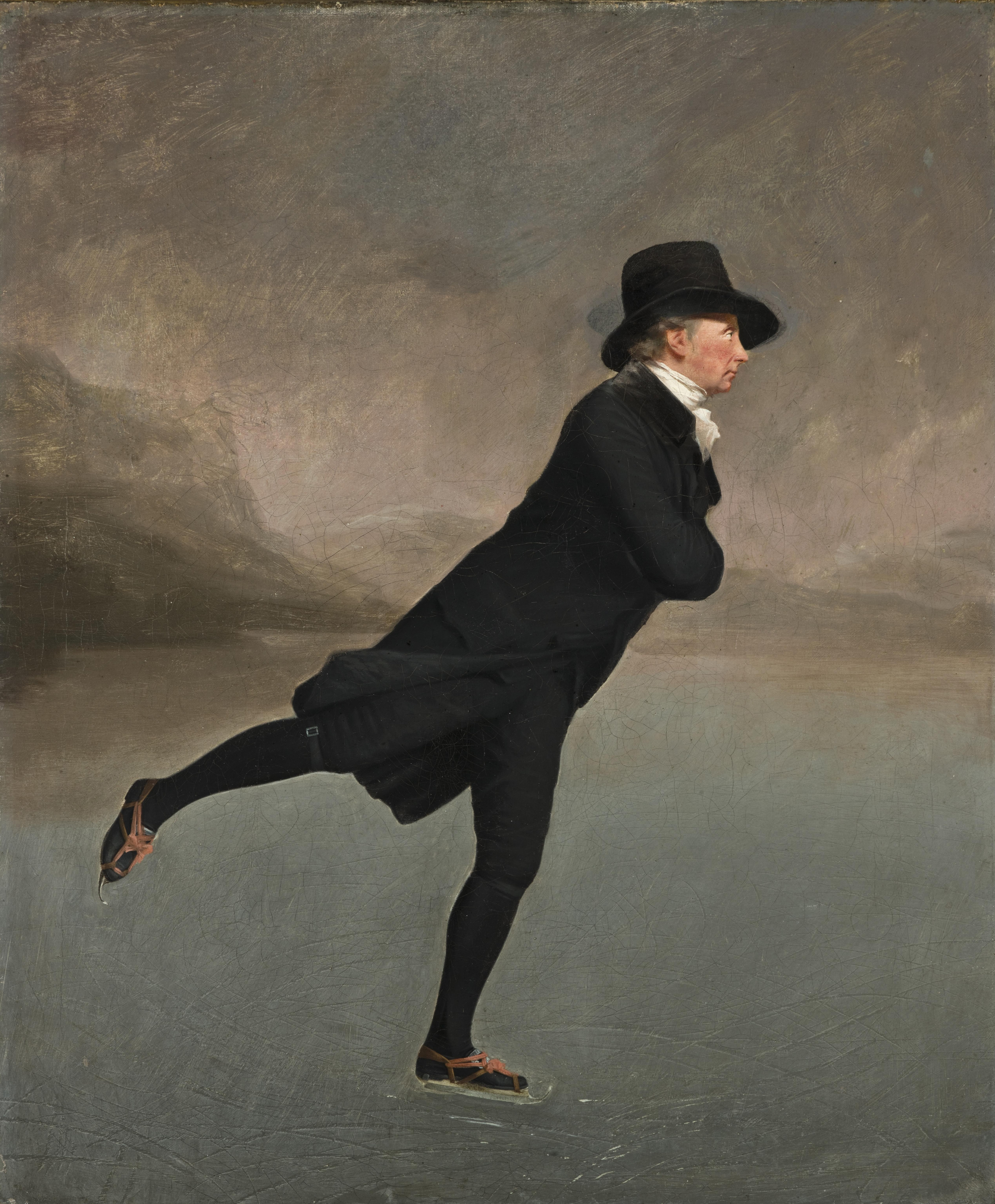
- The club's most famous member, The Skating Minister
- Formation: 1742-1744
- Dissolved: 1966
- Location: Edinburgh, Scotland

The Edinburgh Skating Club is recognized as the first organized figure skating club. While some sources claim the club was established in 1642, most sources accept 1742 or 1744 as the date of its founding. (Note: According to figure skating historian James R. Hines, the club was formed in 1744.) The next-oldest skating club, in London, was not founded until 1830. The club was dissolved in 1966 after the decline in interest in combined figure-skating.

The claim to the 1642 founding date appears to derive from a small book published by the club council in 1865, The Edinburgh Skating-Club with Diagrams of Figures and a List of the Members. As of that writing, the club's oldest extant records were dated January 1778, and the reference to 1642 appeared only in club records from long after that period.

There was an early contemporary reference to the Club in the second edition (1783) of the Encyclopædia Britannica that supports the 1742 or 1744 founding date:

The metropolis of Scotland has produced more instances of elegant skaters than perhaps any country whatever: and the institution of a skating club about 40 years ago has contributed not a little to the improvement of this elegantement.

From this description and others, it is apparent that the form of skating practiced by club members was indeed an early form of figure skating rather than speed skating. For admission to the club, candidates had to pass a skating test where they performed a complete circle on either foot (e.g., a figure eight), and then jumped over first one hat, then two and three, placed over each other on the ice. Prospective members had to demonstrate flow and control on edges by skating a complete circle in the ice on each foot, similar to figure eights in compulsory figures but unlike them in that the circles did not have to be joined together. Skaters also had to "demonstrate athletic daring" by jumping over one to three hats placed on the ice.

The favorite meeting place of club members was Duddingston Loch, near Edinburgh, Scotland. The principal object of the club was the practice of a form of choreographed group skating. The club also held an annual dinner where the standard dish served was "sheeps-heads and trotters", perhaps in deference to the local Sheep Heid Inn in Duddingston.

Today the club is best known for its association with the painting The Skating Minister by Henry Raeburn, more formally titled The Reverend Robert Walker Skating on Duddingston Loch.
