= Robert Walker (archdeacon of Peterborough) =

Robert Percival Walker was a Canadian Anglican priest in the middle of the 20th century.

Walker was educated at University of Toronto. Ordained in the 1930s, his first post was a curacy in Guelph. After that he served at several parishes in Toronto. He was Rector of St Luke, Peterborough, Ontario from 1956 to 1972; and its Archdeacon from 1962.
