= Kite ice skating =

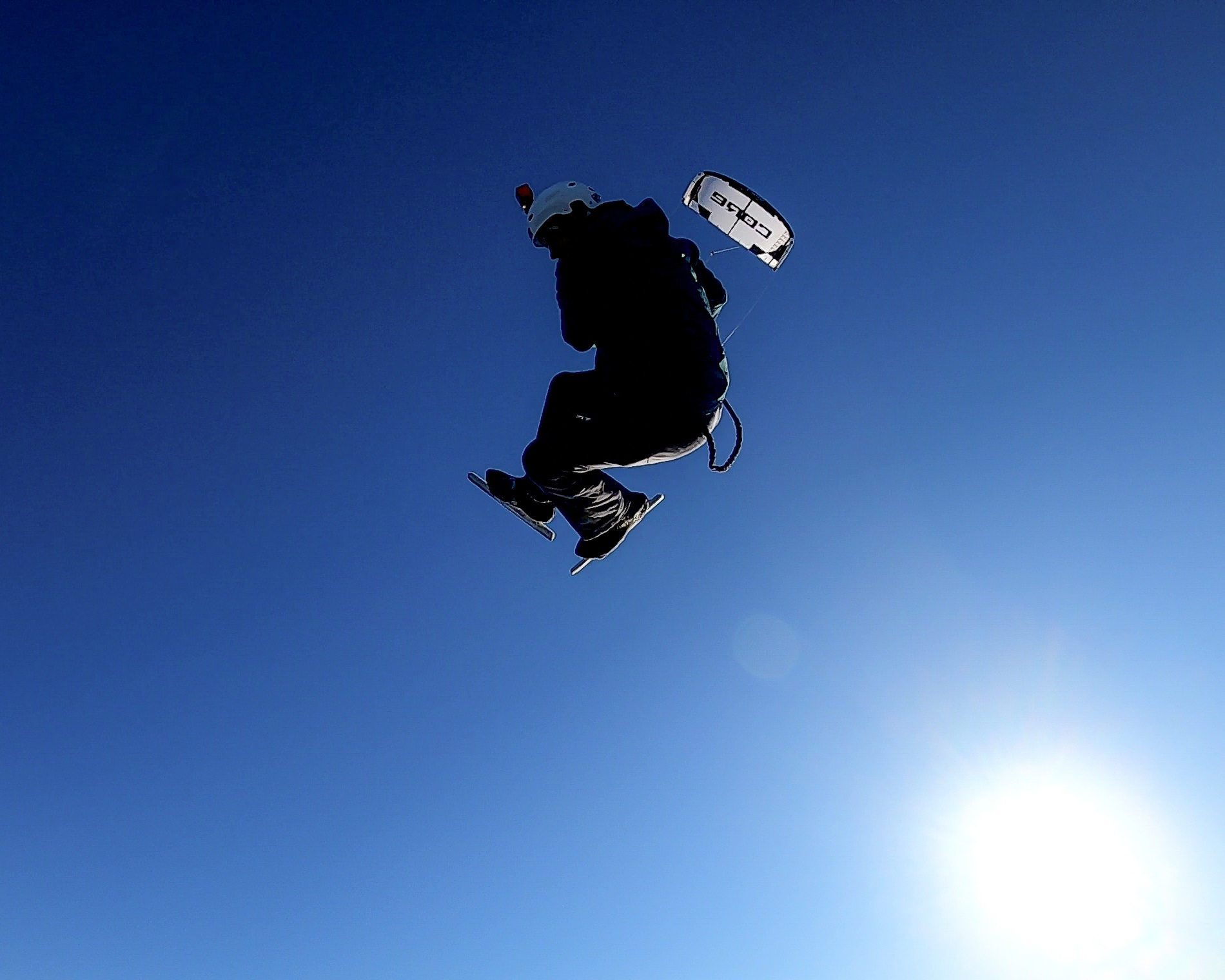
Aerial trick while kiteskating by rider Martins Sprogis

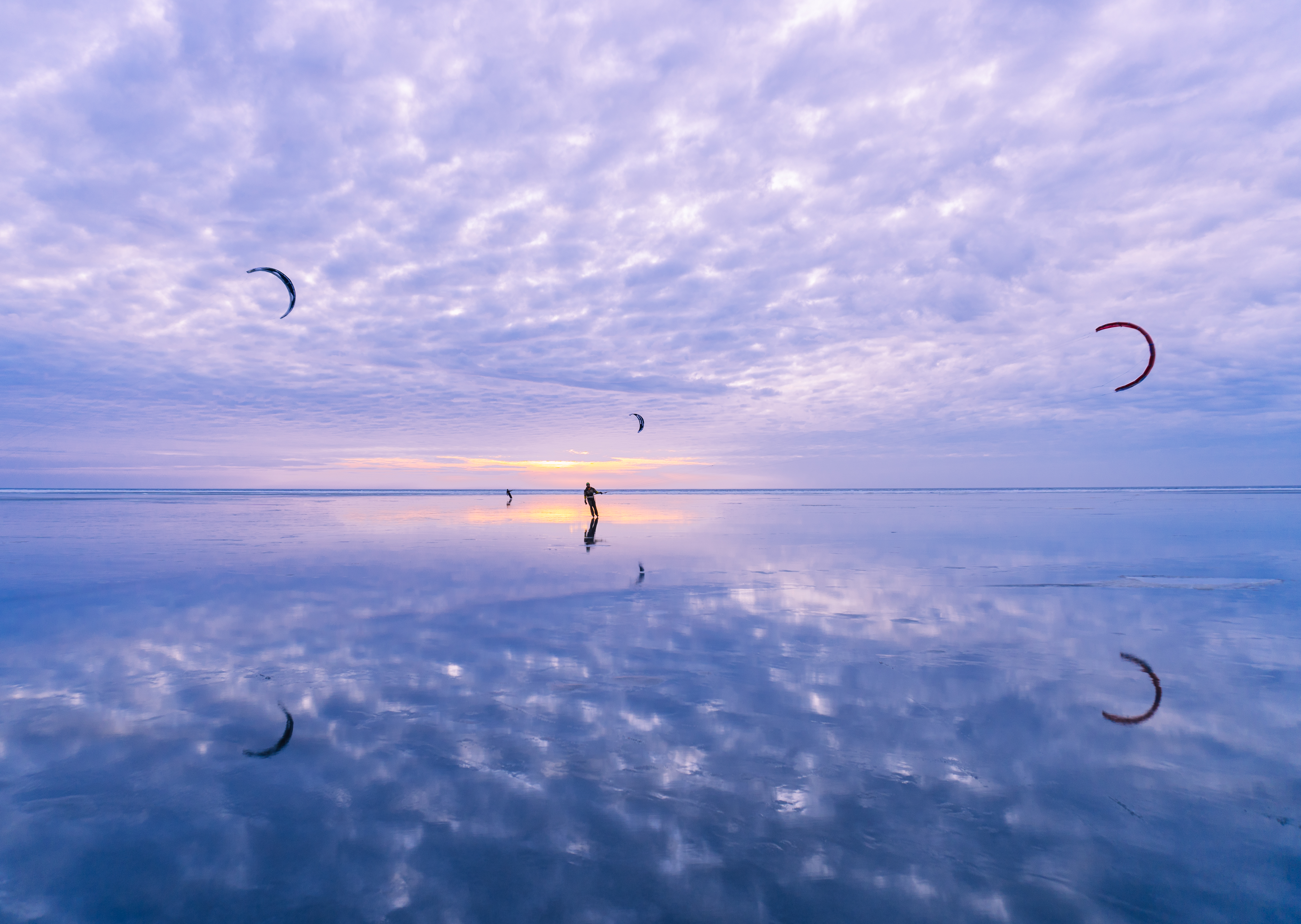
Kiteskating during a sunset

Kite ice skating, sometimes referred to as ice kiting, ice kite skating, para-skating or para ice skating, is a sport practised on ice skates using a large controllable kite to propel across frozen rivers, frozen lakes and other frozen surfaces.

In gusty conditions, speed must be controlled by raising the kite in the air parallel to the ice, or moving it in the opposite direction to the direction of riding to slow down. Kite ice skaters often perform tricks and invent new ones, for example, "Double around the world".

== Safety considerations ==
Kite skaters can travel faster than wind speed by angling the kite, similarly to the method used in sailing to trim a boat's course and sails for greater speed. It is possible to quickly exceed safe speeds, exhausting the skater's legs from absorbing the shock of bumpy ice, and becoming susceptible to crashes.

A helmet, elbow, and knee protection are strongly advised. Care should be taken not to ride over the lines while setting up. Selecting the correct kite size is also important; smaller kites should be used than one would use on water (for example, in kite surfing) in the same wind conditions, as ice skates offer very little friction or resistance.

== See also ==
- Kite rollerskating
