= Robert Walker (footballer, born 1922) =

Scottish footballer

Personal information
- Full name: Robert Wilson Walker
- Date of birth: 21 May 1922
- Place of birth: Aberdeen, Scotland
- Date of death: 13 September 1991 (aged 69)
- Place of death: Aberdeen, Scotland
- Position: Centre-forward

Senior career*
Years	Team	Apps	(Gls)
	Aberdeen	0	(0)
1946–1947	Bournemouth	2	(2)
1947–1948	Wrexham	2	(0)
- * Club domestic league appearances and goals

Robert Wilson Walker (21 May 1922 – 13 September 1991) was a Scottish professional footballer, who played as a centre-forward. He made appearances in the English Football League for Bournemouth and Wrexham
