= Figure skating club =

A figure skating club is a local organization of figure skaters, often centered on a single ice rink. Typical club activities include arranging practice ice time, hosting test sessions and competitions, and producing an annual ice show in which club skaters may take part. Some clubs also emphasize non-skating social activities.

== Practice ice ==
Many ice rinks, particularly those that are municipally owned, do not sell practice ice directly to figure skaters. Instead, the local figure skating club contracts with the rink for blocks of ice time, which the club then resells to its members. At some clubs, the normal procedure is for skaters to contract in advance for an entire season's worth of ice time.

In North America, a relatively small number of skating clubs own their own rink instead of buying ice time. In recent years, it has also become more common for privately owned commercial rinks to run figure skating sessions themselves.

Figure skating coaches are typically private contractors paid directly by the skaters for their work, rather than employees of the skating club or rink. However, skating clubs can effectively make hiring decisions by requiring coaches to go through an approval process before being allowed to work on practice sessions controlled by the club.

== Tests, competitions, and shows ==
Some national skating federations such as the United States Figure Skating Association and Skate Canada define a graduated series of skill tests which are used to measure and reward skaters' progress, and to classify them into competition levels. Administration of these tests is largely left up to the individual skating clubs. Some clubs with a large and active membership may have a test session each month, or even more frequently. Other clubs that cater primarily to recreational skaters may have only one test session each year. In addition to being of benefit to skaters, test sessions are the primary means by which figure skating judges are trained.

Many clubs organize an annual competition. Most club competitions are focused on giving children an opportunity to perform. A low-level skater might compete a few times a year at competitions hosted by various clubs in their region. A few of the larger established club competitions attract elite competitors as well, who may use these events to try out new programs or receive a critique or evaluation from international judges.

Clubs may also host or assist in organizing a major competition from time to time. For example, the U.S. Figure Skating Championships are typically organized with the assistance of one or more local skating clubs in the host city, which share a portion of the event's profits.

Ice shows or "carnivals" are another annual tradition at many clubs. Again, the focus is usually on giving younger skaters an opportunity to participate. Often club shows feature one or two invited elite guest skaters who perform solos, while the club members skate in groups sorted by age or ability.
