= William Walker =

William Walker may refer to:

== Arts ==
- William Walker (English engraver) (1729–1793), English engraver
- William Walker (Scottish engraver) (1791–1867), mezzotint engraver of portrait of Robert Burns
- William Sidney Walker (1795–1846), English Shakespearean critic
- William Walker (composer) (1809–1875), American Baptist song leader and composer, compiler of Southern Harmony (1835)
- William Aiken Walker (1839–1921), American artist
- Blind Willie Walker (1896–1933), American blues guitarist and singer
- Bill Walker (actor) (William Franklin Walker, 1896–1992), African-American film actor (To Kill a Mockingbird)
- William Walker (muralist) (1927–2011), muralist in Chicago
- William Walker (baritone) (1931–2010), singer with the Metropolitan Opera
- Wee Willie Walker (1941–2019), American soul blues singer
- Sugar Belly (William Walker), Jamaican mento musician

== Military ==
- William H. T. Walker (1816–1864), Confederate general in the American Civil War
- William Stephen Walker (1822–1899), Confederate brigadier general
- William Walker (filibuster) (1824–1860), American filibuster in Latin America; briefly ruled Nicaragua
- William George Walker (1863–1936), recipient of the Victoria Cross
- William Walker (RFC airman), British First World War flying ace
- William Walker (RAF officer) (1913–2012), at the time of his death the oldest survivor of the Battle of Britain
- William J. Walker, United States Army general

== Politics ==
- Bill Walker (American politician) (born 1951), governor of Alaska
- William Walker (Quebec merchant) (1790–1863), Lower Canada merchant and politician
- William Walker (Quebec politician) (1797–1844), Lower Canada lawyer and politician
- William Walker (Wyandot leader) (1800–1874), Native American leader, sometime chief of the Wyandot Nation in Ohio and Kansas
- William Adams Walker (1805–1861), U.S. representative from New York
- William Walker (filibuster) (1824–1860), American mercenary who usurped the office of president of Nicaragua in 1856–1857
- William Walker (New South Wales politician) (1828–1908), Australian politician
- William Walker (New South Wales colonial politician) (1820–1889), Australian politician
- William Walker (trade unionist) (1871–1918), Irish trade unionist and socialist
- William Campbell Walker (1837–1904), New Zealand politician
- William Froggatt Walker (1841–1890), Australian politician
- William H. Walker (New York City politician) (1842–1916), American politician, father of New York City mayor Jimmy Walker
- William H. Walker (Canadian politician) (1847–1913), member of the Legislative Assembly of Quebec
- William L. Walker Jr. (born 1960), American politician, former Arkansas state senator
- William O. Walker (1896–1981), American publisher, politician and editor
- William G. Walker (born 1935), former US ambassador to El Salvador and leader of the Kosovo Verification Mission
- William Walker (Iowa politician) (1834–1899), American politician in Iowa

== Sports ==
- William Walker (Australian cricketer) (1835–1886), Australian cricketer
- William Walker (footballer, born 1871) (1871–1907), Scottish footballer
- Billy Walker (jockey) (1860–1933), African-American jockey
- William Walker (footballer, born 1884) (1884–1945), Scottish footballer (Clyde FC and Scotland)
- William Walker (English cricketer) (1889–1938), English cricketer
- William Walker (Scottish cricketer) (1894–1960), Scottish cricketer and cricket administrator
- Willie Walker (footballer, born 1891) (1891–1968), English football outside left
- Willie Walker (Queen's Park footballer) (1888–1974), Scottish footballer
- Willie Walker (footballer, born 1906), Scottish footballer
- Willie Walker (rugby union) (born 1978), New Zealand rugby union footballer
- William Walker (cyclist) (born 1985), Australian racing cyclist
- Will Walker (Australian footballer) (born 1999), Australian rules footballer
- William Walker (baseball) (fl. 1937), baseball center fielder in the Negro leagues
- Willie Walker (American football) (born 1942), American football player

== Other ==
- William Walker (schoolmaster) (1623–1684), English schoolmaster
- William Walker (principal) (1704–1761), British Principal of New Inn Hall
- William Walker (surgeon) (1813–1875), Scottish surgeon
- William R. Walker (architect) (1830–1905), American architect
- William H. Walker (Vermont judge) (1832–1896), Vermont attorney and judge
- William Walker (1838–1908), Scottish-born Australian writer
- William Walker (priest) (died 1911), Dean of Aberdeen and Orkney
- William R. Walker (publisher), 19th-century English printer and publisher
- William David Walker (1839–1917), bishop in the Episcopal Church
- William Walker, 1st Baron Wavertree (1856–1933), British businessman, art collector, and racehorse breeder
- William Walker (diver) (1869–1918), diver who saved Winchester Cathedral from collapse
- William Hultz Walker (1869–1934), American chemistry professor and a pioneer of chemical engineering
- William F. Walker (1937–2007), President of Auburn University 2001–2007
- William R. Walker (born 1944), Canadian leader in The Church of Jesus Christ of Latter-day Saints
- Black Racer (DC Comics) or Sgt. William "Willie" Walker, a character in DC Comics

== See also ==
- Bill Walker (disambiguation)
- Billy Walker (disambiguation)
