= Bill Walker =

Bill Walker may refer to:

== Australian rules football ==
- Bill A. Walker (1886–1934), Australian rules footballer for Essendon
- Bill Walker (Australian footballer, born 1883) (1883–1971), Australian rules footballer for Fitzroy
- Bill J. V. Walker (1886–1949), Australian rules footballer for University
- Bill Walker (Australian footballer, born 1942), Australian rules footballer for Swan Districts

== US sport ==
- Bill Walker (American football) (1933–2019), American football end for the Detroit Lions
- Bill Walker (American football guard) (1920–2002), American football guard for the Boston Yanks
- Bill Walker (baseball) (1903–1966), American baseball pitcher
- Bill Walker (Toledo basketball) (c. 1926–2001), American basketball player
- Henry Walker (basketball) (born 1987), American basketball player previously known as Bill Walker

== Politics ==
- Bill Walker (American politician) (born 1951), American lawyer and politician, former Governor of Alaska
- Bill Walker (American politician, Arkansas) (born 1960), American politician, former member of the Arkansas House of Representatives and Arkansas Senate.
- Bill Walker (Canadian politician) (born 1966), Member of the Legislative Assembly of Ontario
- Bill Walker (Scottish Conservative politician) (1929–2017), Scottish politician, Conservative Party MP, 1979–1997
- Bill Walker (SNP politician) (born 1942), Scottish politician, MSP for Dunfermline, 2011–2013

== Other ==
- Bill Walker (music director) (1927–2022), Australian music composer and director
- Bill Walker (actor) (1896–1992), American television and film actor
- Bill Walker (other actor), American film actor, co-star of 1961 film The Mask
- Bill Walker (artist) (1917–2011), Chicago muralist
- Bill Walker (broadcaster) (1922–1995), Canadian broadcaster and actor

== See also ==
- William Walker (disambiguation)
- Billy Walker (disambiguation)
