= Lettsom =

Lettsom is a surname. Notable people with the surname include:

- John Coakley Lettsom (1744–1815), English physician and philanthropist
- William Garrow Lettsom (1805–1887), British diplomat and scientist
- William Nanson Lettsom (1796–1865), English man of letters
