= William Lettsom =

William Lettsom may refer to:

- William Nanson Lettsom, English man of letters
- William Garrow Lettsom, British diplomat, mineralogist and spectroscopist
