= Tom Cringle =

Tom Cringle may refer to:

- Tom Cringle, pseudonym of Michael Scott (Scottish author) (1789–1835), British author
- Tom Cringle, nom-de-plume of William Walker (1838–1908), Scottish-born Australian writer
