= Billy Walker =

Billy Walker may refer to:

- Billy Walker (footballer, born 1897) (1897–1964), English footballer of the 1920s and 1930s, later a football manager
- Billy Walker (footballer, born 1879) (1879–?), English footballer
- Billy Walker (boxer) (born 1939), English heavyweight boxer of the 1960s
- Billy Walker (musician) (1929–2006), American country music singer and guitarist
- Billy Walker (Scottish footballer) (1893–after 1925), Scottish footballer of the 1910s and 1920s
- Billy Walker (rugby union) (born 1996), English rugby tighthead prop
- Billy Joe Walker Jr. (1952–2017), session guitarist and New Age musician

== Fictional characters ==
- Billy Walker, in the UK TV soap opera Coronation Street, played by Kenneth Farrington

== See also ==
- Bill Walker (disambiguation)
- William Walker (disambiguation)
