= Bill J. V. Walker =

Australian rules footballer (1886–1949)

Bill Walker

Personal information
- Full name: William James Vincent Walker
- Born: 4 August 1886; Castlemaine, Victoria
- Died: 20 April 1949 (aged 62); Caulfield, Victoria
- Original team: Teachers Training College
- Height: 168 cm (5 ft 6 in)
- Weight: 66 kg (146 lb)

Playing career^{1}
Years	Club	Games (Goals)
1912–13	University	10 (3)
- ^{1} Playing statistics correct to the end of 1913.

William James Vincent Walker (4 August 1886 – 20 April 1949) was an Australian rules footballer who played with University in the Victorian Football League in 1912 and 1913.

A teacher, Walker enlisted in August 1915 and served in the Army Educational Services, rising through the ranks from Private to become a commissioned officer by the end of the war.
