= William Sidney Walker =

English Shakespearean critic

William Sidney Walker (1795–1846) was an English Shakespearean critic.

== Life ==
Born at Pembroke in Wales, on 4 December 1795, he was the eldest child of John Walker, a naval officer, who died at Twickenham in 1811 from the effects of wounds received in action. The boy was named after his godfather, Admiral Sir Sidney Smith, under whom his father had served. His mother's maiden name was Falconer. William Sidney, always called Sidney, spent some years at a school at Doncaster, kept by his mother's brother, and with a private tutor at Forest Hill; he then entered Eton College in 1811. At Eton he learnt the whole of Homer by heart, and wrote Greek verse with facility. There, too, he began lifelong friendships with Winthrop Mackworth Praed and John Moultrie.

Walker, small, uncouth and absent-minded, was bullied at school. He was entered as a sizar at Trinity College, Cambridge, on 16 February 1814, but did not come into residence until the following year. He won the Craven scholarship in 1817, and the Porson prize for Greek verse in 1818, and he was admitted scholar of Trinity on 3 April of the latter year. Although his weak mathematics rendered his passing the examination for the degree of B.A. in 1819 difficult, he was elected for his classical attainments to a fellowship at his college in 1820. He maintained close relations with Praed and Moultrie, and formed a friendship with Derwent Coleridge.

In 1824 he was an unsuccessful candidate for the Greek professorship at Cambridge. He made no other effort to engage in educational work. While a fellow of Trinity he lived in seclusion in his college rooms, reading desultorily.

As an undergraduate Walker had religious doubts, and had applied for guidance to William Wilberforce. During 1818–19 Wilberforce wrote him letters in which he endeavoured to confirm his beliefs. The influence of Charles Simeon helped him for a time; but he deemed himself disqualified by his sceptical views regarding eternal punishment from taking holy orders. As a consequence he resigned his fellowship in 1829.

Without income, he fell into debt. His friend Praed came to his assistance in 1830, and, after paying his debts, settled on him an income for life of £52 a year; Trinity College added £20. Walker moved to London in 1831, lodging at first in Bloomsbury, and then in the neighbourhood of St. James's Street. He lived entirely alone, and suffered from mental illness. He neglected himself, and social life.

He died of the stone at his lodging, a single room on the top floor of 41 St. James's Place, on 15 October 1846. He was buried in Kensal Green Cemetery. On the tomb were engraved some lines from his friend Moultrie's poem The Dream of Life.

== Works ==
In 1813, when he was seventeen, he published by subscription the first four books of an epic in a volume entitled ‘Gustavus Vasa, and other Poems.’ After leaving school, he made some contributions to the Etonian, which Praed edited. In 1815 he published ‘The Heroes of Waterloo: an Ode,’ as well as translations of ‘Poems from the Danish, selected by Andreas Andersen Feldborg.’ In 1816 appeared another ode by Walker, ‘The Appeal of Poland.’

He contributed philological essays to the Classical Journal, and both verse and prose to Charles Knight's Quarterly Magazine. In 1823 he prepared for publication John Milton's newly discovered treatise De Ecclesia Christiana, of which Charles Richard Sumner, then librarian at Windsor, was the ostensible editor. In 1828 he edited for Knight a Corpus Poetarum Latinorum (other editions 1848 and 1854).

John Moultrie published in 1852 a collection of his letters and poems, as ‘The Poetical Remains of William Sidney Walker, formerly Fellow of Trinity College, Cambridge, with a Memoir of the Author.’

Walker left voluminous manuscripts, examined by William Nanson Lettsom, who published in 1854 ‘Shakespeare's Versification, and its Apparent Irregularities explained by Examples from Early and Late English Writers.’ This volume was printed at the expense of George Crawshay, who made Walker's acquaintance just before he left Cambridge; it reached a second edition in 1857, and a third in 1859. There followed in 1860, in three volumes, which Lettsom also edited, ‘A Critical Examination of the Text of Shakespeare, with Remarks on his Language and that of his Contemporaries, together with Notes on his Plays and Poems.’ Walker's two Shakespearean works mainly deal with minute points of Shakespearean prosody and syntax, but with a wealth of illustrative quotation from Elizabethan literature.
