= Billy Walker (footballer, born 1879) =

English footballer

Personal information
- Full name: Walter William Walker
- Date of birth: 1879
- Place of birth: Horseley Heath, England
- Position: Inside forward

Senior career*
| Years | Team | Apps | (Gls) |
| 1897–1899 | Toll End Wesley | | |
| 1899–1902 | West Bromwich Albion | 34 | (5) |
| 1903–1908 | Brierley Hill Alliance | | |
| 1908 | Dudley | | |
| Total | | 34 | (5) |
- * Club domestic league appearances and goals

Walter William Walker (1879–unknown) was an English footballer who played in the Football League for West Bromwich Albion.
