= William Walker (Iowa politician) =

American politician (1834–1899)

William Walker (2 March 1834 – 7 November 1899) was an American farmer and politician in Iowa.

Walker was born in Huron County, Ohio, on 2 March 1834. He was one of ten children born to a father of English descent and a mother of Irish descent. Walker was raised primarily in Michigan. He moved to Audubon County, Iowa, in 1855 and began farming. In 1858, Walker married fellow Ohio native Nancy J. Bowen, who had relocated to Audubon, Iowa. The couple raised five sons and four daughters to adulthood. Alongside his agricultural investments, Walker owned a general store in Exira, Iowa, and was a Freemason. In later life, he converted from Methodism to Congregationalism.

Walker voted for John C. Frémont in the 1856 United States presidential election and continued supporting Republican political candidates throughout his life. Though he lived in an area dominated by the Democratic Party, Walker was elected to consecutive terms on the Iowa House of Representatives in 1888 and 1890, and held the District 34 seat until 1892.

In 1899, Walker was diagnosed with stomach cancer. He sought medical treatment in Chicago, and died of the disease in Exira on 7 November 1899. Walker was buried two days later, in Exira.
