= William Walker (1838–1908) =

Australian writer (1838–1908)

William Walker (1838–1908), was a Scottish-born Australian writer. Also known as William Walker of Bombay, Walker wrote a series of letters under the name of "Tom Cringle". The nom-de-plume derives from Tom Cringles Log published pseudonymously by Michael Scott in Blackwood's Magazine.

== Bibliography ==
- Jottings of an Invalid in search of Health, comprising a run through British India and a visit to Singapore and Java. A series of letters reprinted from the Times of India. (British Library 2010)
- Proposed Excretal Sewage System for Melbourne
- On the philosophy of stinks which do not affect public health whilst the neglect of house ventilation fills our grave-yards
- The hand and physiognomy of the human form in relation to the mind
- A brief memoir of Mr. James Cooke, royal jester and circus clown (1866)
- Australian sand-bar harbours and rivers : with hints on the sea defences of Melbourne
- Earthquake waves : are they possible? (1868)
- Ella Zoyara, the beautiful : the fairy of the magic ring
- Facts for Factories

Manuscript copies of letters from Walker (writing as Tom Cringle) to William H. Herndon relating to Abraham Lincoln's defense of William Armstrong for the murder of James Metzker are in the Lincoln Collection at the University of Chicago (William E. Barton Collection of Lincolniana) (2 letters, 3pp and 2pp).
