= William Nanson Lettsom =

British intellectual (1796–1865)

William Nanson Lettsom (1796–1865) was an English man of letters.

== Life ==
He was the son of John Miers Lettsom, M.D. (son of John Coakley Lettsom), by Rachel, daughter of William Nanson, born 4 February 1796. He passed from Eton College to Trinity College, Cambridge, where he graduated B.A. in 1818 and M.A. in 1822, and won prizes for the Latin ode and two epigrams in 1816, and for the ode again in 1817.

Having ample private means, he devoted his life to a study of literature. He died on 3 September 1865 at Westbourne Park, Paddington.

== Works ==
He published a translation of the Nibelungenlied, with the title ‘The Fall of the Nebelungers; otherwise the book of Kriemhild’, in 1850. He edited from the author's manuscripts William Sidney Walker's ‘Shakespeare's Versification’ (1854) and his ‘Critical Examination of the Text of Shakespeare’ (1860). His friend Alexander Dyce was assisted by Lettsom in his preparation of his edition of Shakespeare. Lettsom also interested himself in textual criticism of the New Testament.
