= William L. Walker Jr. =

State legislator in Arkansas (b. 1960)

William L. "Bill" Walker Jr. (born October 24, 1960) is an American politician and member of the Democratic Party, who has served in the Arkansas House of Representatives and Arkansas Senate. He served in the Arkansas House of Representatives from 1987–1994; and the Arkansas Senate from 1995–2002. He often uses the name Bill Walker, and lives in Little Rock.

Walker was born in Little Rock. He is Baptist. He is married and has a daughter. He unsuccessfully campaigned in 2006 to be Mayor of Little Rock.'

After leaving the senate, Walker took a job as director of the Arkansas Career Education Department and then president of a funeral home company. In 2017, Walker was on the Board of Trustees of Arkansas Baptist College. As of 2026, Walker's role on the same board is treasurer.

On September 30, 2025, Walker was handcuffed during a dispute with Little Rock police officers before being released at the direction of Police Chief Heath Helton. That decision came after Little Rock Mayor Frank Scott Jr. reached out to Helton. The dispute stemmed from an altercation Walker's daughter had with Little Rock Police.
