= 2026 Kingston upon Thames London Borough Council election =

2026 English local government election

- 7 May 2026

All 48 seats to Kingston upon Thames London Borough Council 25 seats needed for a majority
	First party	Second party
Leader	Andreas Kirsch	Rowena Bass
Party	Liberal Democrats	Conservative
Last election	44 seats, 47.9%	3 seats, 25.4%
Seats won	44	2
Seat change	0	-1
	Third party
Leader	James Giles
Party	KIRG
Last election	1 seat, 5.7%
Seats won	2
Seat change	+1
- Results of the 2026 Kingston upon Thames council election. Liberal Democrats in orange, Conservatives in blue and the KIRG in pink.
Leader before election
Andreas Kirsch
Liberal Democrats
Leader after election
Andreas Kirsch
Liberal Democrats

The 2026 Kingston upon Thames London Borough Council election took place on 7 May 2026. All 48 members of Kingston upon Thames London Borough Council were elected. The elections took place alongside local elections in the other London boroughs and elections to local authorities across the United Kingdom.

The council was under Liberal Democrat majority control prior to the election. They increased their majority at this election, winning 44 of the 48 seats.

== Background ==
In 2022 the Liberal Democrats retained control of Kingston upon Thames council. The Conservatives formed the opposition with three seats.

== Previous council composition ==
After 2022 election		Before 2026 election		After 2026 election	
Party	Seats	Party	Seats	Party	Seats
Liberal Democrats	44	Liberal Democrats	42	Liberal Democrats	44
Conservative	3	Conservative	2	Conservative	2
KIRG	1	KIRG	4	KIRG	2

Changes 2022–2026:

- September 2022: Tim Cobbett (Liberal Democrats) resigns – by-election held November 2022
- November 2022: Yvonne Tracey (KIRG) wins by-election
- November 2023: Jamal Chohan (Conservative) joins KIRG
- May 2024: Steph Archer (Liberal Democrats) resigns – by-election held July 2024
- July 2024: Lorraine Dunstone (Liberal Democrats) wins by-election
- August 2024: Kamala Kugan (Liberal Democrats) joins KIRG

== Election results ==
Council composition after the 2022 election

Council composition after the 2026 election

2026 Kingston upon Thames London Borough Council election
Party	Candidates	Seats	Gains	Losses	Net gain/loss	Seats %	Votes %	Votes	+/−
Liberal Democrats	48	44	1	1	Steady	91.66	45.04	66,405	▼2.86
Conservative	48	2	-	1	▼1	4.17	14.99	22,099	▼10.41
KIRG	34	2	1	-	▲1	4.17	8.35	12,306	▲2.65
Green	40	0	-	-	Steady	-	13.10	19,310	▲5.50
Reform	41	0	-	-	Steady	-	11.56	17,049	NEW
Labour	48	0	-	-	Steady	-	6.48	9,557	▼6.22
Independent	2	0	-	-	Steady	-	0.27	391	▲0.07
Monster Raving Loony Party	3	0	-	-	Steady	-	0.19	279	▼0.21
Heritage	1	0	-	-	Steady	-	0.02	30	NEW

== Ward results ==
=== Alexandra ===
Alexandra (2)
Party	Candidate	Votes	%	±%
Liberal Democrats	Ian Manders	1,006	42	
Liberal Democrats	Amir Khan	951	40	
Conservative	Simon Illsley	451	19	
Conservative	Arjun Johal	413	17	
Reform	Jill Anderson	318	13	
KIRG	Aaron Mafi	315	13	
Green	Anna Burlingsby	290	12	
KIRG	Gavin Pushparajan	286	12	
Reform	Ann Buchan	277	12	
Green	Des Kay	238	10	
Labour	Margaret Freedman	129	5	
Labour	James Lock	91	4	
Total votes				
Turnout				
Liberal Democrats hold		Swing		
Liberal Democrats hold		Swing		

=== Berrylands ===
Berrylands (2)
Party	Candidate	Votes	%	±%
Liberal Democrats	Anita Schaper	1,331	48	
Liberal Democrats	Rizwana Malik	1,203	44	
Conservative	Steve Kent	662	24	
Conservative	Paul Bedforth	654	24	
Green	Joyce Kay	397	14	
Reform	Garfield Bateman	329	12	
Green	Philip Smith	317	12	
Reform	Anthony Ayoola	289	11	
Labour	Estelle Buchanan	159	6	
Labour	Roy Green	148	5	
Total votes				
Turnout				
Liberal Democrats hold		Swing		
Liberal Democrats hold		Swing		

=== Canbury Gardens ===
Canbury Gardens (2)
Party	Candidate	Votes	%	±%
Liberal Democrats	Christopher Higgins	1,362	52	
Liberal Democrats	Nicolai Due-Gundersen	1,311	50	
Green	Linda Jane Sawyer	455	17	
Conservative	Anand Rajpurohit	357	14	
Reform	Maria Blake	321	12	
Conservative	Mohammad Beheshti	320	12	
Green	Ian Bryn Worrall	314	12	
Reform	Anthony Larkin	304	12	
Labour	Kelly Galvin	168	6	
Labour	Christopher Priest	134	5	
KIRG	Mihaela McKendrick	133	5	
KIRG	Ali Abdulla	102	4	
Turnout		5,281		
Liberal Democrats hold		Swing		
Liberal Democrats hold		Swing		

=== Chessington South & Malden Rushett ===
Chessington South & Malden Rushett (3)
Party	Candidate	Votes	%	±%
Liberal Democrats	Andreas Kirsch	1,641	51	
Liberal Democrats	Griseldis Kirsch	1,542	47	
Liberal Democrats	Sharukh Mirza	1,518	47	
Reform	Simon Bain	1,001	31	
Reform	Kevin Eggleton	946	29	
Reform	Pawel Lachowski	855	26	
Conservative	Sue Towner	590	18	
Conservative	Irena Boylett	502	15	
Conservative	John Eakin	496	15	
Labour	Laurie South	178	5	
Labour	Alfred Pirotta	173	5	
Labour	Fe Wood	148	2	
Monster Raving Loony	Captain Coiley	79	1	
Monster Raving Loony	A Chinners	74	2	
Total votes				
Turnout				
Liberal Democrats hold		Swing		
Liberal Democrats hold		Swing		
Liberal Democrats hold		Swing		

=== Coombe Hill ===
Coombe Hill (2)
Party	Candidate	Votes	%	±%
Conservative	Rowena Bass	854	38	
Conservative	Ian George	760	34	
KIRG	Jamal Chohan	636	28	
KIRG	Zebunisa Rao	494	22	
Liberal Democrats	Zain Abbas	407	18	
Liberal Democrats	Tushar Aneja	383	17	
Green	Patrick Goodacre	227	10	
Reform	Jeanine Bateman	203	9	
Labour	Anthony Murray	92	4	
Labour	Sally Richardson	69	3	
Total votes				
Turnout				
Conservative hold		Swing		
Conservative hold		Swing		

=== Coombe Vale ===
Coombe Vale (3)
Party	Candidate	Votes	%	±%
Liberal Democrats	Kim Bailey	1,744	48	
Liberal Democrats	Brian Austen	1,608	44	
Liberal Democrats	Andrew Sillett	1,378	38	
Conservative	Cathy Roberts	755	21	
Conservative	Lee Marcel	738	7	
Green	Chloe Bell	699	19	
Conservative	Pallavi Konwar	670	18	
KIRG	David Giles	561	15	
KIRG	Phil Doyle	511	14	
Green	Peter Whitworth	472	13	
KIRG	Suniya Qureshi	441	12	
Reform	Sandy Piercey	426	12	
Independent	Kamala Kugan	319	9	
Labour	Ian Parker	252	7	
Labour	Nick Draper	242	7	
Labour	Brian Thomas	181	5	
Total votes				
Turnout				
Liberal Democrats hold		Swing		
Liberal Democrats hold		Swing		
Liberal Democrats hold		Swing		

=== Green Lane & St James ===
Green Lane & St James (2)
Party	Candidate	Votes	%	±%
KIRG	James Giles	1,043	45	
KIRG	Yvonne Tracey	1,001	44	
Liberal Democrats	Simon Foylan	863	38	
Liberal Democrats	Rory Hall	772	34	
Reform	Lucy Grimstone	175	8	
Labour	Pat Dobson	165	7	
Reform	Gregory Jarrett	161	7	
Labour	Gerry Jones	133	6	
Conservative	Mike Chattey	129	6	
Conservative	Rosemary Salusbury	86	4	
Independent	Dunia Al-Baghdadi	72	3	
Total votes				
Turnout				
KIRG hold		Swing		
KIRG hold		Swing		

=== Hook & Chessington North ===
Hook & Chessington North (3)
Party	Candidate	Votes	%	±%
Liberal Democrats	Joanne Barker	1,510	46	
Liberal Democrats	Sue Ansari	1,496	46	
Liberal Democrats	Lorraine Dunstone	1,460	45	
Reform	Angus Cameron	900	28	
Reform	Stephen Cherry	888	27	
Conservative	David Phillips	621	19	
Conservative	Noëlle Carteret	599	18	
Conservative	Kye Slawson-Powell	486	15	
Green	Elizabeth Hill	376	11	
Green	David Webb	326	10	
Green	Parsa Bahadori	317	10	
KIRG	Liam Hebborn	268	8	
Labour	David Cooper	159	5	
Labour	Christine Thompson	148	5	
Labour	Rosemary Vase	138	4	
Monster Raving Loony	Liam Secrett	126	4	
Total votes				
Turnout				
Liberal Democrats hold		Swing		
Liberal Democrats hold		Swing		
Liberal Democrats hold		Swing		

=== King George's & Sunray ===
King George's & Sunray (2)
Party	Candidate	Votes	%	±%
Liberal Democrats	Helen Grocott	916	49	
Liberal Democrats	Mark Beynon	902	48	
Conservative	Nausheen Arnold	492	26	
Conservative	Gia Borg-Darcy	418	22	
Green	Pauline Howard	240	13	
Green	Kate Worley	218	12	
KIRG	Julian McCarthy	166	9	
Labour	Bob Freedman	150	8	
Labour	Andrew Prosser	146	8	
KIRG	Danyaal Khwaja	110	6	
Total votes				
Turnout				
Liberal Democrats hold		Swing		
Liberal Democrats hold		Swing		

=== Kingston Gate ===
Kingston Gate (3)
Party	Candidate	Votes	%	±%
Liberal Democrats	Sarah Wait-Sillett	1,807	49	
Liberal Democrats	Nicholas Evans	1,797	49	
Liberal Democrats	Peter Manners	1,668	45	
Green	Matt Browne	824	22	
Green	Elizabeth Walter	718	19	
Green	Michael Wright	544	15	
Conservative	Donald Porter	431	12	
Conservative	Leela Seaton	402	11	
Conservative	Rahul Naithani	392	11	
Reform	Robert Edwards	351	9	
KIRG	Kerry Giles	321	9	
Reform	Alexander Horsfall	316	9	
Reform	Graham Matthews	307	8	
KIRG	Noor Jamal Chohan	306	8	
Labour	Tam Holmes	276	7	
KIRG	Sonu Ali Sayeed	250	7	
Labour	James Oatridge	193	5	
Labour	Frank Kitson	184	5	
Total votes				
Turnout				
Liberal Democrats hold		Swing		
Liberal Democrats hold		Swing		
Liberal Democrats hold		Swing		

=== Kingston Town ===
Kingston Town (3)
Party	Candidate	Votes	%	±%
Liberal Democrats	Roger Hayes	1,277	42	
Liberal Democrats	Nicola Nardelli	1,184	39	
Liberal Democrats	Sabah Hamed	1,175	39	
Green	James Dean	592	20	
Green	Peter Czaja	573	19	
Green	Raffaele Litto	563	19	
Labour	Elizabeth Coleman	441	15	
Conservative	Gillian Aston	405	13	
Conservative	Terry Bowers	384	13	
Reform	Tony James	375	12	
Reform	John Ennett	374	12	
Conservative	Marie McGuire	348	12	
Labour	James Stanton	318	11	
Reform	Osvaldina Prezilius	313	10	
Labour	Keegan Hillier	302	10	
KIRG	Rubina Cassell	161	5	
KIRG	Hayley Smithers	147	5	
KIRG	Jabeen Shah	115	4	
Total votes				
Turnout				
Liberal Democrats hold		Swing		
Liberal Democrats hold		Swing		
Liberal Democrats hold		Swing		

=== Motspur Park & Old Malden East ===
Motspur Park & Old Malden East (2)
Party	Candidate	Votes	%	±%
Liberal Democrats	Callum Morrissey	1,182	47	
Liberal Democrats	Wimal Wimalathasan	1,005	40	
Conservative	Terry Paton	718	28	
Conservative	Rob Smith	656	26	
Reform	Diane Ferguson-Smith	443	17	
Reform	Riona Woodman	399	16	
Green	Bea Osbourne	370	15	
Labour	Alastair Breen	151	6	
Labour	Sean Casey	144	6	
Total votes				
Turnout				
Liberal Democrats hold		Swing		
Liberal Democrats hold		Swing		

=== New Malden Village ===
New Malden Village (3)
Party	Candidate	Votes	%	±%
Liberal Democrats	Mark Durrant	1,524	44	
Liberal Democrats	Dongsung Kim	1,320	38	
Liberal Democrats	Lesley Heap	1,327	38	
KIRG	Richard Hebborn	1,043	30	
KIRG	Deepa Veneik	899	26	
KIRG	Raju Pandya	851	25	
Green	Lucy Howard	531	15	
Conservative	Caroline Bowis	371	11	
Conservative	John Bowis	336	10	
Green	Jem Kale	329	10	
Green	Joel Monroe	314	9	
Reform	David Bent	306	9	
Conservative	Valerie McIntyre	278	8	
Labour	Tess Bowyer	261	8	
Reform	James Stileman	254	7	
Labour	Michelle Gordon	232	7	
Labour	Gary See	201	6	
Total votes				
Turnout				
Liberal Democrats hold		Swing		
Liberal Democrats hold		Swing		
Liberal Democrats hold		Swing		

=== Norbiton ===
Norbiton (3)
Party	Candidate	Votes	%	±%
Liberal Democrats	Emily Davey	1,416	49	
Liberal Democrats	Olly Wehring	1,297	45	
Liberal Democrats	Sam Foulder-Hughes	1,124	39	
Labour	Tony Banks	537	19	
Green	Martin Hall	524	18	
Green	Fahima Mahomed	497	17	
Green	Dylan Stewart	438	15	
Labour	Liz Meerabeau	410	14	
Labour	Tom Wingfield	391	13	
Reform	Christopher Last	359	12	
Reform	Andrew Parker	358	12	
Reform	Jo Melbourne	352	12	
Conservative	Kevin Davis	275	9	
KIRG	Soha Sultana	264	9	
Conservative	Sandira Beeko	229	8	
Conservative	John Rutter	222	8	
Total votes				
Turnout				
Liberal Democrats hold		Swing		
Liberal Democrats hold		Swing		
Liberal Democrats hold		Swing		

=== Old Malden ===
Old Malden (2)
Party	Candidate	Votes	%	±%
Liberal Democrats	Mike Massimi	1,311	52	
Liberal Democrats	Elizabeth Park	1,228	49	
Conservative	John Baek	467	19	
Conservative	Harry Foskin	450	18	
Reform	Nicholas Badham	394	16	
Reform	Ismail Birant	284	11	
Green	David Charlton	249	10	
Green	Harrie Vischjager	194	8	
Labour	Graeme Hodge	147	3	
Labour	Rahul Khandelwal	138	5	
KIRG	Clair Hebborn	91	4	
KIRG	Chris Walton	63	2	
Heritage	Michael Watson	30	1	
Total votes				
Turnout				
Liberal Democrats hold		Swing		
Liberal Democrats hold		Swing		

=== St Mark's & Seething Wells ===
St Mark's & Seething Wells (3)
Party	Candidate	Votes	%	±%
Liberal Democrats	Helen Milestone	2,146	52	
Liberal Democrats	Robert Sadler	1,943	47	
Liberal Democrats	Yogan Yoganathan	1,892	46	
Green	Archie Coyne	1,103	27	
Green	Ayse Demir	1,065	26	
Green	Abbas Aref	1,062	26	
Conservative	Tim Brown	513	12	
Conservative	Carole Robinson	470	11	
Reform	Caroline Ford	468	11	
Reform	Nick Frei	418	10	
Conservative	Ian Wilson	402	10	
Reform	Marcus Mohammed	344	8	
Labour	Emma Francis	260	6	
Labour	Joseph Al-Khalili	198	5	
Labour	John Matthews	172	4	
Total votes				
Turnout				
Liberal Democrats hold		Swing		
Liberal Democrats hold		Swing		
Liberal Democrats hold		Swing		

=== Surbiton Hill ===
Surbiton Hill (3)
Party	Candidate	Votes	%	±%
Liberal Democrats	Alison Holt	1,948	55	
Liberal Democrats	Tom Reeve	1,833	52	
Liberal Democrats	Manish Shukla	1,619	46	
Green	Emma Loffler	599	17	
Green	Nannette Herbert	578	16	
Green	Conor McGovern-Paul	459	13	
Conservative	Kristine Boudreau	458	13	
Reform	Jackie Alex	428	12	
Conservative	Alasdair Rennie	426	12	
Reform	Noel Alex	418	12	
Conservative	Colin Suckling	407	11	
Reform	Peter Harris	399	11	
KIRG	Glen Colegate	223	6	
Labour	Oliver Freedman	204	6	
Labour	Rebecca Way	189	5	
KIRG	Andrea Chambers	175	5	
Labour	Kris Saravanan	171	5	
KIRG	Easha-tir-Raazi Khawaja	113	3	
Total votes				
Turnout				
Liberal Democrats hold		Swing		
Liberal Democrats hold		Swing		
Liberal Democrats hold		Swing		

=== Tolworth ===
Tolworth (3)
Party	Candidate	Votes	%	±%
Liberal Democrats	Jane Lim	1,861	52	
Liberal Democrats	Thay Thayalan	1,838	51	
Liberal Democrats	Andrew Wooldrige	1,754	49	
Green	Louise Burlingsby	563	16	
Reform	John Butcher	509	14	
Green	Luma Al-Azzawi	474	13	
Reform	Alan Seager	458	13	
Reform	Silva Kaludura	444	12	
Green	Owen Oastler	442	12	
KIRG	Jessica Dearlove	428	12	
Conservative	Mary Perham	321	9	
Conservative	Martin Pike	287	8	
KIRG	Mark Thomas	269	7	
Labour	Victoria Bowers	265	7	
Conservative	Andrew Willson	265	7	
KIRG	Michael Firth	249	7	
Labour	Christopher Ellis	199	6	
Labour	Gill Gray	187	5	
Total votes				
Turnout				
Liberal Democrats hold		Swing		
Liberal Democrats hold		Swing		
Liberal Democrats hold		Swing		

=== Tudor ===
Tudor (2)
Party	Candidate	Votes	%	±%
Liberal Democrats	Blaise Murphet	1,355	48	
Liberal Democrats	Sachin Tulyani	1,270	45	
Conservative	Julian Bedale	642	23	
Conservative	Jamila Bibi-Sarwar	491	17	
Green	Alison Gomez-Russell	433	15	
Green	Lydia Poole	386	14	
Reform	Bernado Barreto-Kuhlbrodt	319	11	
Reform	Jithwin Venkata	266	9	
KIRG	Maureen Wilkins	137	5	
KIRG	Syreeta Howard-James	134	5	
Labour	Michael Middleton	101	4	
Labour	James Pike	82	1	
Total votes				
Turnout				
Liberal Democrats hold		Swing		
Liberal Democrats gain from Conservative		Swing		
