= Kingston and Surbiton =

UK Parliament constituency (since 1997)

Coordinates: 51.377°N 0.291°W

- Borough constituency for the House of Commons
- Interactive map of boundaries since 2024
- Location within Greater London
- County: Greater London
- Electorate: 75,410 (March 2020)
- Major settlements: Kingston (part), Surbiton and Malden

Current constituency
- Created: 1997
- Member of Parliament: Ed Davey (Liberal Democrats)
- Created from: Surbiton and Kingston (part)

Kingston and Surbiton (/ˈkɪŋstən ənd ˈsɜːrbɪtən/) is a constituency (Note: A borough constituency (for the purposes of election expenses and type of returning officer).) in Greater London created in 1997 and represented in the House of Commons of the UK Parliament (Note: As with all constituencies, the constituency elects one Member of Parliament (MP) by the first past the post system of election at least every five years.) since 2017 by Ed Davey, the Leader of the Liberal Democrats. Davey previously held the seat from 1997 until losing reelection in 2015 to Conservative James Berry.

Kingston and Surbiton was considered a marginal seat between 2010 and 2019, and the seat changed hands twice in that period. However, in 2019 Davey won a majority of 17.2% and received over half of the votes cast at that election; the seat is now regarded as a safe seat for the Liberal Democrats.

== Constituency profile ==
Kingston and Surbiton is a mostly suburban constituency located in the Royal Borough of Kingston upon Thames in Greater London, around 12 miles (19 km) southwest of the centre of London. The constituency contains the town centre of Kingston upon Thames and the neighbourhoods of Surbiton, New Malden, Tolworth and Chessington. Kingston upon Thames is an ancient market town and was traditionally the site where kings were crowned during the Anglo-Saxon era. Suburban development began during the mid-19th century, and the town is today one of the country's largest retail centres. The constituency also contains Chessington World of Adventures, one of the country's most-visited theme parks. The constituency is generally affluent, particularly so in Surbiton. House prices are lower than the rest of London but considerably higher than the national average.

In general, residents of Kingston and Surbiton are young, well-educated and have very high rates of household income. A high proportion work in retail, education and professional occupations. White people made up 71% of residents at the 2021 census, a higher rate than the rest of London. Asians were the largest ethnic minority group at 16%; the constituency has large Indian and Sri Lankan populations as well as the country's largest Korean community concentrated in New Malden. At the local borough council, all seats in the constituency are represented by Liberal Democrat councillors. Voters strongly supported remaining in the European Union in the 2016 referendum; an estimated 61% voted to remain compared to the nationwide figure of 48%.

== History ==
The constituency was created in 1997, when the number of seats covering the boroughs of Kingston upon Thames and Richmond upon Thames was reduced from four to three. It replaced the former Surbiton constituency completely and also covers the south of the former Kingston constituency.

Political history

Former Chancellor of the Exchequer Norman Lamont represented Kingston from a by-election in 1972 until the 1997 general election, when he was not selected as the Conservative candidate for either of its replacements. Instead, the incumbent Surbiton MP Richard Tracey was selected, while Lamont unsuccessfully contested Harrogate and Knaresborough in North Yorkshire. In the event, Tracey was defeated by the Liberal Democrat candidate Ed Davey by the very narrow margin of 56 votes.

In the 2011 referendum on whether the UK should adopt the Alternative Vote (AV) system, the Royal Borough of Kingston upon Thames, which covers most of the constituency, voted against the proposal by 60.5%.

Davey held on to the seat until the general election of 2015, when he was defeated by the Conservative James Berry during the national Liberal Democrat vote collapse. The 2015 result gave the seat the 26th most marginal majority of the Conservative Party's 331 seats by percentage of majority.

In the 2016 referendum on the UK's membership of the European Union, the borough voted to remain in the European Union by 61.6%.

Davey, now knighted, regained the seat for the Liberal Democrats in the 2017 general election with the eighth largest vote share increase for the party nationally.

The local council, which covers most of the constituency, alternates between Liberal Democrat majority control (1994–1998 and 2002–2014) and no overall control (1986–1994 and 1998–2002). However, in 2014, it became a Conservative-majority council; the last Conservative administration was between 1964 and 1986. Traditionally, the southern wards vote for the Liberal Democrats, whereas the north and north-eastern wards vote for the Conservatives, with some Labour representation in the Norbiton ward.

In all seven elections since its establishment, Kingston and Surbiton has voted for a candidate from the same party as the neighbouring constituency of Twickenham, which was established at the same time. Both seats have seen one Conservative win and six Liberal Democrat wins.

In December 2023, the Labour Party included the seat in its published list of 211 non-battleground seats, suggesting they did not see it as winnable.

== Boundaries ==
=== Historic ===
1997–2010: The Royal Borough of Kingston upon Thames wards of Berrylands, Burlington, Chessington North, Chessington South, Grove, Hook, Malden Manor, Norbiton Park, Norbiton, St James, St Mark's, Surbiton Hill, Tolworth East, Tolworth South, and Tolworth West.

Map of boundaries 2010-2024

2010–2024: The Royal Borough of Kingston upon Thames wards of Alexandra, Berrylands, Beverley, Chessington North and Hook, Chessington South, Grove, Norbiton, Old Malden, St James, St Mark's, Surbiton Hill, and Tolworth and Hook Rise.

The new contents reflected the revision of ward names and boundaries which came into effect at the 2002 local elections.

As part of its Fifth periodic review of Westminster constituencies, the Boundary Commission (Note: For the subregion used see South London) made minor changes to re-align the constituency boundaries with the boundaries of the local government divisions (wards); moving the entirety of the Beverley ward, which had been partly in Richmond Park, into Kingston and Surbiton. The associated public consultation received 11 submissions, of which 10 in support. The revisions came into effect at the 2010 general election.

=== Current ===
Further to the completion of the 2023 review of Westminster constituencies, which came into effect for the 2024 general election, the seat was subject to boundary changes, with the Old Malden and St James wards (as they existed on 1 December 2020) being transferred to Wimbledon. In part compensation, the Coombe Vale ward was transferred in from Richmond Park.

Following these changes, as well as reflecting the 2022 local government review, the constituency now comprises the following:

- The Royal Borough of Kingston upon Thames wards of Alexandra, Berrylands, Chessington South & Malden Rushett, Coombe Vale (nearly all), Green Lane & St James (part), Hook & Chessington North, King George's & Sunray, Kingston Town, New Malden Village (most), Norbiton, St Mark's & Seething Wells, Surbiton Hill, Tolworth, and Old Malden (small part).

The constituency covers most of the Royal Borough of Kingston upon Thames, covering the town of Surbiton, Chessington, New Malden, Tolworth and the south of Kingston itself. The northern part of Kingston has remained since 1997 in the Richmond Park seat and Old Malden is now included in Wimbledon.

== Members of Parliament ==
Election	Member	Party
1997	Ed Davey	Liberal Democrats
2015	James Berry	Conservative
2017	Ed Davey	Liberal Democrats

== Elections ==
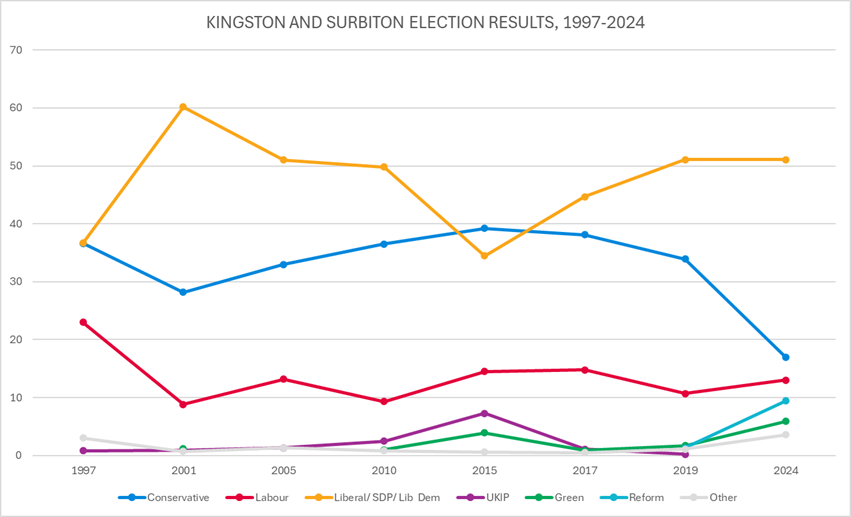
Election results 1997-2024

=== Elections in the 2020s ===
(Note: As the constituency borders changed, the percentage changes are based on notional values.)

General election 2024: Kingston and Surbiton
Party	Candidate	Votes	%	±%
Liberal Democrats	Ed Davey	25,870	51.1	−1.5
Conservative	Helen Edward	8,635	17.0	−16.0
Labour	Eunice O'Dame	6,561	13.0	+2.7
Reform	Mark Fox	4,787	9.4	+8.3
Green	Debojyoti Das	3,009	5.9	+4.4
KIRG	Yvonne Tracey	1,177	2.3	N/A
Workers Party	Ali Abdulla	395	0.8	N/A
Monster Raving Loony	A.Gent Chinners	230	0.5	+0.2
Majority		17,235	34.0	+14.4
Turnout		50,664	65.5	−10.2
Registered electors		77,340		
Liberal Democrats hold		Swing	+7.2	

=== Elections in the 2010s ===
2019 notional result
Party	Vote	%
Liberal Democrats	30,058	52.6
Conservative	18,884	33.1
Labour	5,829	10.2
Green	900	1.6
Brexit Party	649	1.1
Others	775	1.3
Turnout	57,095	75.7
Electorate	75,410	

General election 2019: Kingston and Surbiton
Party	Candidate	Votes	%	±%
Liberal Democrats	Ed Davey	31,103	51.1	+6.4
Conservative	Aphra Brandreth	20,614	33.9	−4.2
Labour	Leanne Werner	6,528	10.7	−4.1
Green	Sharron Sumner	1,038	1.7	+0.8
Brexit Party	Scott Holman	788	1.3	New
Independent	James Giles	458	0.8	New
Monster Raving Loony	Chinners Chinnery	193	0.3	+0.0
UKIP	Roger Glencross	124	0.2	−0.9
Majority		10,489	17.2	+10.6
Turnout		60,846	74.2	−2.0
Registered electors		81,975		
Liberal Democrats hold		Swing	+5.3	

Results of UK House of Commons seat Kingston and Surbiton

General election 2017: Kingston and Surbiton
Party	Candidate	Votes	%	±%
Liberal Democrats	Ed Davey	27,810	44.7	+10.3
Conservative	James Berry	23,686	38.1	−1.1
Labour	Laurie South	9,203	14.8	+0.3
UKIP	Graham Matthews	675	1.1	−6.2
Green	Chris Walker	536	0.9	−3.1
Monster Raving Loony	Chinners	168	0.3	New
Independent	Michael Basman	100	0.2	New
Majority		4,124	6.6	N/A
Turnout		62,178	76.2	+3.3
Registered electors		81,588		
Liberal Democrats gain from Conservative		Swing	+5.7	

General election 2015: Kingston and Surbiton
Party	Candidate	Votes	%	±%
Conservative	James Berry	23,249	39.2	+2.7
Liberal Democrats	Ed Davey	20,415	34.5	−15.3
Labour	Lee Godfrey	8,574	14.5	+5.2
UKIP	Ben Roberts	4,321	7.3	+4.8
Green	Clare Keogh	2,322	3.9	+2.9
CPA	Daniel Gill	198	0.3	−0.1
TUSC	Laurel Fogarty	174	0.3	New
Majority		2,834	4.8	N/A
Turnout		59,253	72.9	+2.5
Registered electors		81,238		
Conservative gain from Liberal Democrats		Swing	+9.0	

General election 2010: Kingston and Surbiton
Party	Candidate	Votes	%	±%
Liberal Democrats	Ed Davey	28,428	49.8	−1.3
Conservative	Helen Whately	20,868	36.5	+3.6
Labour	Max Freedman	5,337	9.3	−3.8
UKIP	Jonathan Greensted	1,450	2.5	+1.2
Green	Chris Walker	555	1.0	New
Monster Raving Loony	Monkey The Drummer	247	0.4	New
CPA	Tony May	226	0.4	New
Majority		7,560	13.2	−4.8
Turnout		57,111	70.4	+1.9
Registered electors		81,115		
Liberal Democrats hold		Swing	−2.4	

=== Elections in the 2000s ===
2005 notional result
Party	Vote	%
Liberal Democrats	25,659	51.1
Conservative	16,558	33.0
Labour	6,610	13.2
Others	1,411	2.8
Turnout	50,238	68.5
Electorate	73,341	

General election 2005: Kingston and Surbiton
Party	Candidate	Votes	%	±%
Liberal Democrats	Ed Davey	25,397	51.0	−9.1
Conservative	Kevin Davis	16,431	33.0	+4.8
Labour	Nick Parrott	6,553	13.2	+4.4
UKIP	Barry Thornton	657	1.3	+0.4
Socialist Labour	John Hayball	366	0.7	+0.1
Veritas	David Henson	200	0.4	New
Rainbow Dream Ticket	George Weiss	146	0.3	New
Majority		8,966	18.0	−14.0
Turnout		49,750	68.5	+1.0
Registered electors		72,658		
Liberal Democrats hold		Swing	−7.0	

General election 2001: Kingston and Surbiton
Party	Candidate	Votes	%	±%
Liberal Democrats	Ed Davey	29,542	60.2	+23.5
Conservative	David Shaw	13,866	28.2	−8.3
Labour	Philip Woodford	4,302	8.8	−14.3
Green	Christopher Spruce	572	1.2	New
UKIP	Patricia Burns	438	0.9	+0.1
Socialist Labour	John Hayball	319	0.6	New
Unrepresented People's Party	Jeremy Middleton	54	0.1	New
Majority		15,676	31.9	+31.8
Turnout		49,093	67.5	−7.8
Registered electors		72,687		
Liberal Democrats hold		Swing	+15.9	

=== Elections in the 1990s ===
General election 1997: Kingston and Surbiton
Party	Candidate	Votes	%	±%
Liberal Democrats	Ed Davey	20,411	36.7	+10.7
Conservative	Richard Tracey	20,355	36.6	−16.5
Labour	Sheila Griffin	12,811	23.0	+3.4
Referendum	Gail Tchiprout	1,470	2.6	New
UKIP	Amy Burns	418	0.8	New
Natural Law	Mark Leighton	100	0.2	New
Rainbow Dream Ticket	Clifford Port	100	0.2	New
Majority		56	0.1	N/A
Turnout		55,665	75.4	–4.2
Registered electors		73,836		
Liberal Democrats gain from Conservative		Swing	+13.6	

1992 notional result
Party	Vote	%
Conservative	29,674	53.0
Liberal Democrats	14,510	25.9
Labour	10,991	19.6
Others	762	1.4
Turnout	55,937	79.6
Electorate	70,238	

== See also ==
- parliamentary constituencies in London
