= Coombe, Kingston upon Thames =

Neighbourhood in London, England

Coordinates: 51.41885°N 0.26415°W

Coombe
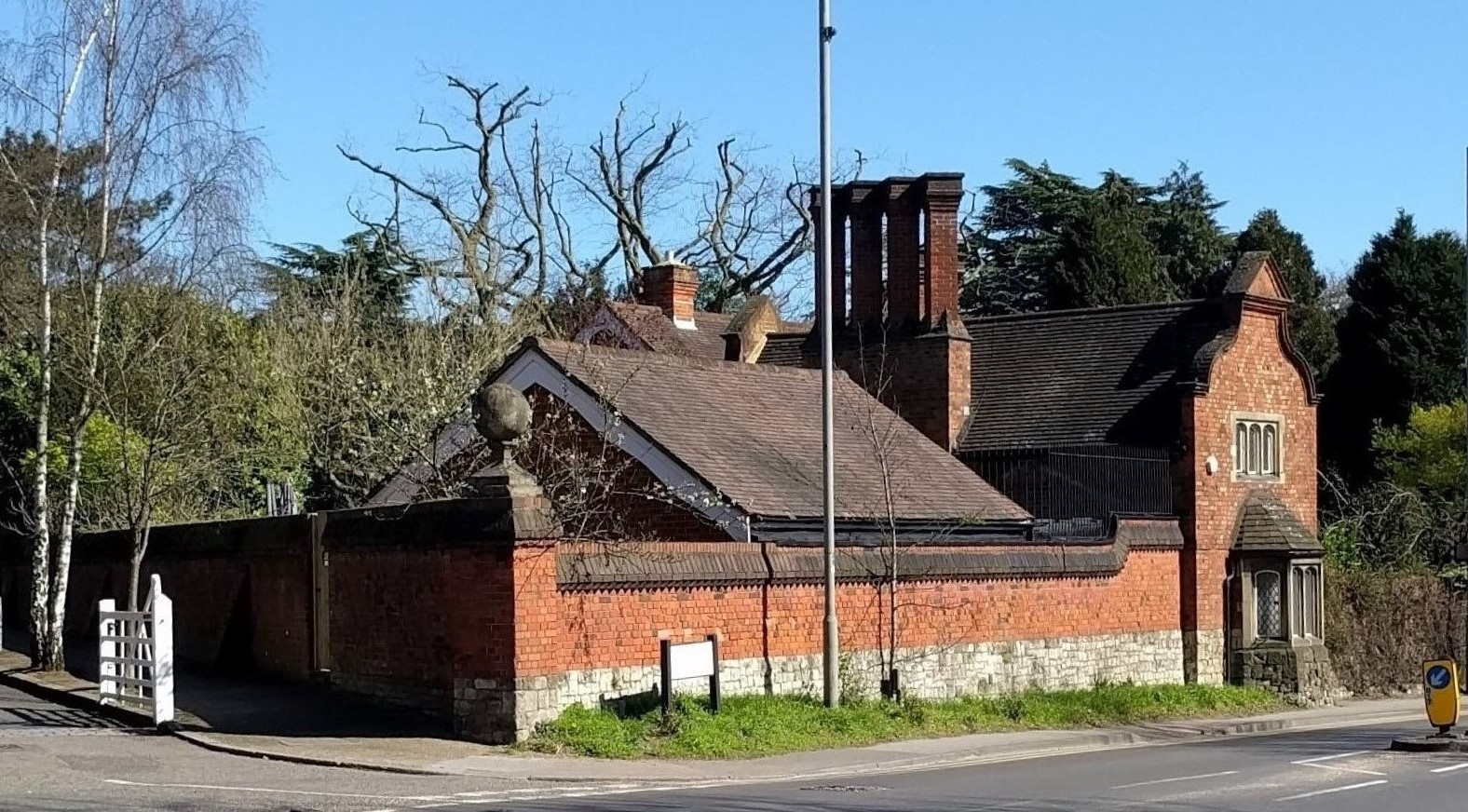
- Coombe Warren Lodge, Coombe Lane

- Location within Greater London
- Population: 20,108 (2011 Census. Coombe Hill and Vale Wards)
- OS grid reference: TQ208703
- London borough: Kingston
- Ceremonial county: Greater London
- Region: London
- Country: England
- Sovereign state: United Kingdom
- Post town: KINGSTON UPON THAMES
- Postcode district: KT2
- Post town: NEW MALDEN
- Postcode district: KT3
- Dialling code: 020
- Police: Metropolitan
- Fire: London
- Ambulance: London
- UK Parliament: Kingston and Surbiton
- London Assembly: South West

Coombe is a historic neighbourhood in the Royal Borough of Kingston upon Thames in south west London, England. It sits on high ground, east of Norbiton. Most of the area was part of the former Municipal Borough of Malden and Coombe before local government re-organisation in 1965. It now shares borders with the boroughs of Merton and Sutton with, to the north, the small, inter-related neighbourhoods of Kingston Hill and Kingston Vale, beyond which is Richmond Park in Richmond; and Roehampton/Putney Vale in Wandsworth. To the east are public playing fields and Wimbledon Common.

== History ==
Coombe centres on what was originally Coombe House, a large residence built in the 1750s. The house, now demolished, was located at the southwest corner of the junction of Coombe Lane (A238) and Traps Lane. Its red brick boundary walls can still be seen on the west side of Traps Lane.

The area has a long history. Roman coins and other ancient remains have been found in the area around Warren Road. Coombe appears in the Domesday Book of 1086 as Cumbe. It was held partly by Hunfrid (Humfrey) the Chamberlain and partly by Ansgot the Interpreter. Its domesday assets were: 1½ hides; 4 ploughs, 12 acres (4.9 ha) of meadow, herbage worth 4 hogs. It rendered £8.

The Neville name has long been associated with the area. In 1215 King John gave Coombe to Hugh de Nevill, and the area was known as Coombe Nevill by 1260. At the beginning of the 14th century the manor was held by William de Nevill. The 1911 Ordnance Survey map identified an estate known as Coombe Nevile at the junction of George and Warren Roads. The present-day cul-de-sac known as Coombe Neville is at the same location. Neville Avenue is a short distance away, south of Coombe Lane.

16th-century records speak of a gallows in Coombe, most likely near what is now Kingsnympton Park estate, reputedly the scene of public executions.

In the early 1700s a public house known as the Fox and Coney was established at the junction of George Road and Kingston Hill (A308). It was rebuilt in 1728 and soon thereafter was renamed the George and Dragon, operating as such until 1985, when it became the Kingston Lodge Hotel.

By 1761 Coombe was owned by John Spencer, 1st Earl Spencer.

Coombe Warren was a wild woodland on the ridge known as Coombe Hill. It was used for hunting and public fairs. 'The Coombe Wood Highwayman', Jerry Abershaw, frequented the area in the late 1700s. Being based at the "Bald Face Stag" pub, he sheltered in the woods. An 1835 map placed Coombe Warren in an area now bisected by Warren Road between Kingston Hill (A308) and Coombe Lane (A238). Portions of the Warren are now covered by the Coombe Hill estate and Coombe Wood Golf Course.

In 1822 the Admiralty opened a semaphore station in the Warren, which was part of the semaphore line from London to Portsmouth. The station has disappeared, but survived in the name of "Telegraph Cottage."

At the time of the 1865 Ordnance Survey, the area west of Warren Road remained largely open country. By 1911 two golf courses were in place, as were a number of large houses located along George Road, including Coombe Croft (briefly home to John Galsworthy's family, now Rokeby School for Boys), Coombe Ridge (now Holy Cross Preparatory School), Coombe Court, Coombe End, Ballard Coombe and Fairview.

Numerous German bombs struck Coombe during World War II.

== Today ==
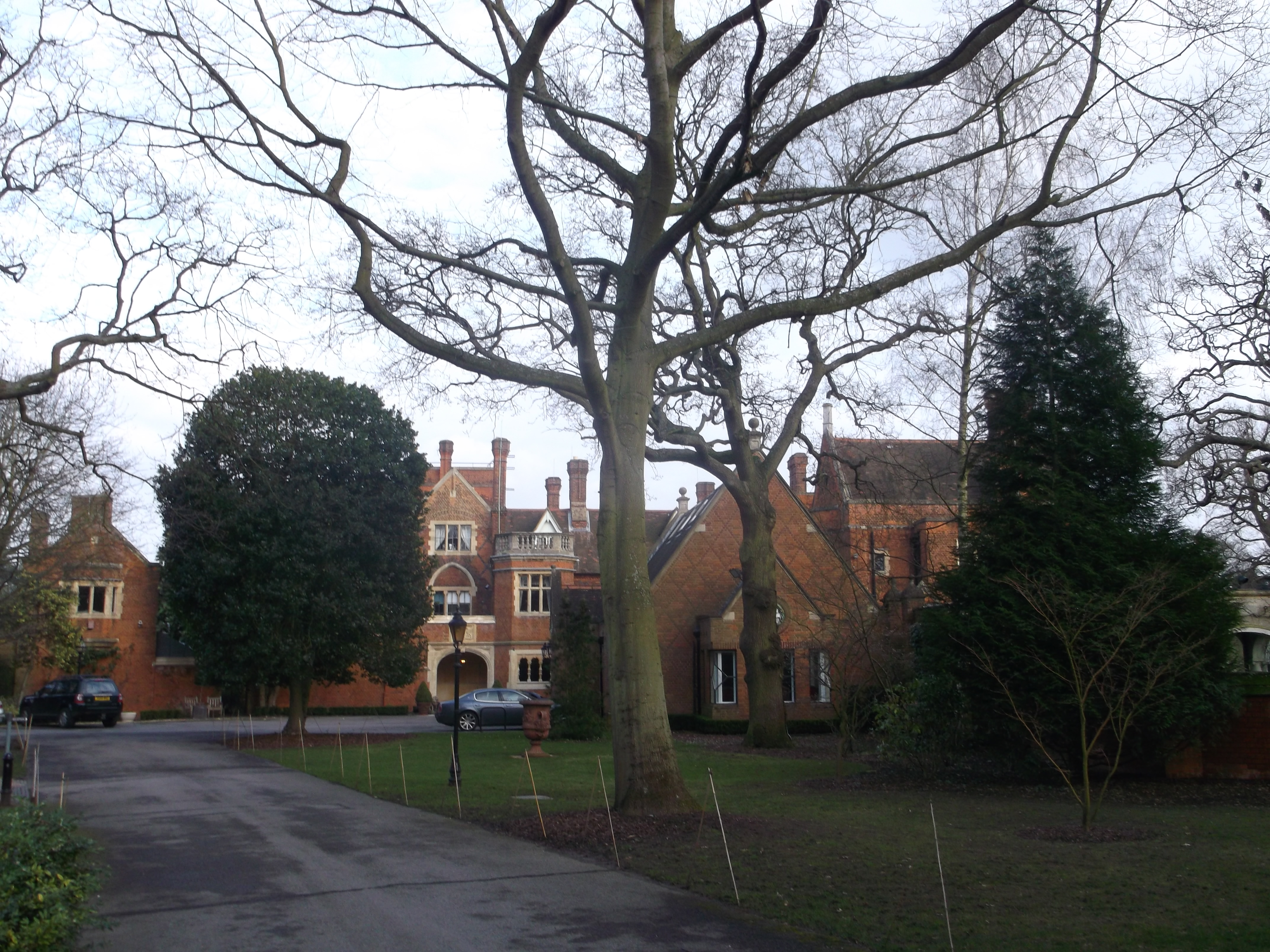
Warren House, a hotel and conference centre on Warren Road

Coombe is a prestigious residential location, with a premium on house prices. Much of the area is occupied by two golf courses, Coombe Wood and Coombe Hill; and three private estates partly on private roads, though in practice access is mostly open, apart from Coombe Park. These are called Coombe Hill, Coombe Warren and Coombe Park. Once the site of now-demolished Coombe Warren, a 19th-century property built by architect George Devey, Coombe Hill estate today consists of Coombe Hill Road and cul-de-sacs such as Greenwood Park and Devey Close; and along Warren Road, George Road and Golf Club Drive.

== Politics ==
Coombe is part of the Kingston and Surbiton constituency for elections to the House of Commons of the United Kingdom.

Coombe is part of the Coombe Hill and Coombe Vale wards for elections to Kingston upon Thames London Borough Council.

Coombe was historically a chapelry in the ancient parish of Kingston. in 1894 Coombe became a civil parish, being formed from the rural part of Kingston upon Thames, on 1 April 1965 the parish was abolished. At the 1951 census (one of the last before the abolition of the parish), Coombe had a population of 8504.

== Notable buildings ==
Grade II-listed buildings and ancient monuments in Coombe include:

- Three Tudor-era structures built as a system for supplying water to Hampton Court Palace from springs in Coombe: Coombe Conduit on Coombe Lane West, Ivy Conduit on the grounds of Holy Cross Preparatory School on George Road, Gallows Conduit on the grounds of Hampton Spring house on George Road;
- Warren House on Warren Road, constructed in the 1860s for banker Hugh Hammersley and extended in 1884–1886 by the architect George Devey; and
- Cedar Court on Coombe Hill Road, built on its present site in 1911–12 incorporating timbers from a late medieval timber-framed building from Colchester (probably the Perseverance Inn, demolished in 1910)

== Notable residents and visitors ==
- Actor Joss Ackland lived at Ravenswood Court.
- Edward Charles Baring commissioned George Devey to create several buildings, including Coombe Hill Stables (1863) and Coombe Warren Lodge.
- The scientist and spiritual leader John G. Bennett lived and taught at Coombe Springs until 1966 when he passed it to Idries Shah, who sold the estate for housing development.
- Kenelm Lee Guinness, member of the Guinness brewing family, racing driver, former holder of the world land speed record and inventor of KLG sparking plugs lived at The White House, Coombe Warren, Kingston Hill.
- Malcolm Campbell, racing driver and former holder of the world land speed record lived at the junction of Kingston Hill and Warboys Approach.
- Donald Campbell, son of Malcolm Campbell and former holder of the world water speed record lived in the same house as his father on Kingston Hill.
- Former tennis player Annabel Croft lives in Coombe Park.
- Dwight D. Eisenhower, when Supreme Allied Commander during World War II, based in Bushy Park, lived at "Telegraph Cottage" in Coombe, which was adjacent to the golf course which he used at weekends.
- Elizabeth I of England visited in 1602.
- John Galsworthy, author of The Forsyte Saga and winner of the 1932 Nobel Prize in Literature, was born in a house on Kingston Hill called Parkfield, which was later named after him. Today, it is a care home for the elderly. The Galsworthy family also lived in Coombe Warren which they renamed Coombe Leigh and which later under new ownership became Coombe Ridge and Coombe Croft. (See Lown and Panizzo book referred to below.)
- William Ewart Gladstone, British Prime Minister and Chancellor of the Exchequer, spent extended periods as a house-guest of friends in Coombe.
- British politician George Glyn (1824–1877) lived in Warren House.
- Douglas Haig, 1st Earl Haig (1861–1928), World War I general, lived at Ravenswood Court.
- Sir Leonard "Len" Hutton, English cricketer, lived on Coombe Neville in the late 1960s.
- Coombe House was owned by Robert Jenkinson, Lord Liverpool (Prime Minister, 1812–27), and later by Prince Adolphus, Duke of Cambridge, a son of George III.
- Dame Nellie Melba, operatic singer, lived in a house here for many years.
- Elisabeth Murdoch, media executive, lived in Coombe for several years.
- Sir Wilfrid Sheldon, a consulting paediatrician and physician paediatrician to the Household of Queen Elizabeth II, lived on Edgecombe Close after his retirement in 1967.
- Jimmy Tarbuck, English comedian and entertainer and his wife live in Coombe.
- Rolling Stones guitarist Ronnie Wood used to live in a Victorian-era home known as Holmwood on Kingston Hill, opposite the entrance of Coombe Park and near Galsworthy House.
- Winston Churchill, British statesman, military officer, and writer, was an early member of Coombe Hill Golf Club.

== Gallery ==
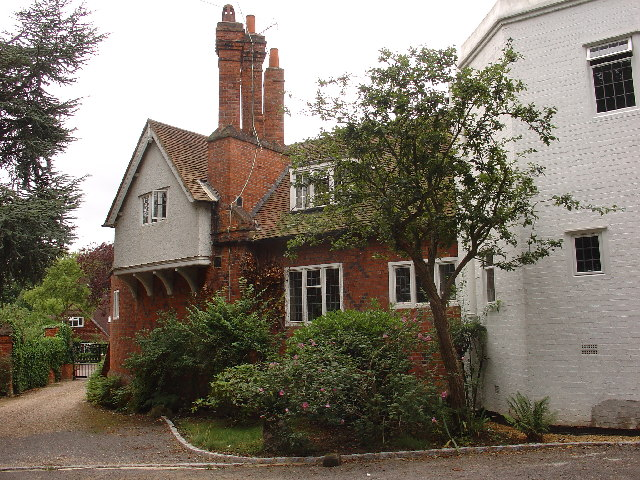
House, Coombe Hill Road

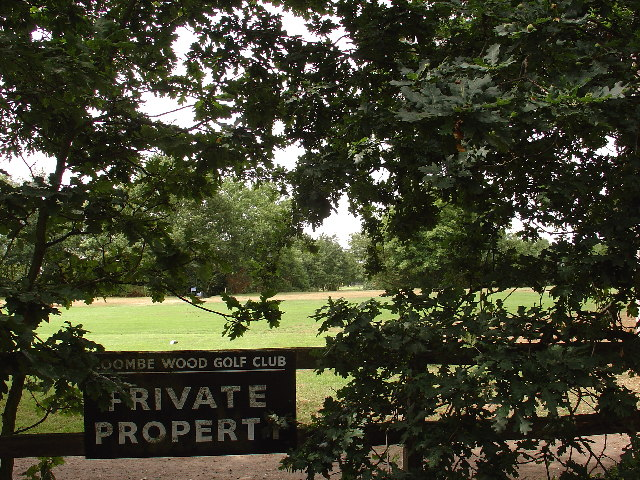
Coombe Wood Golf Club

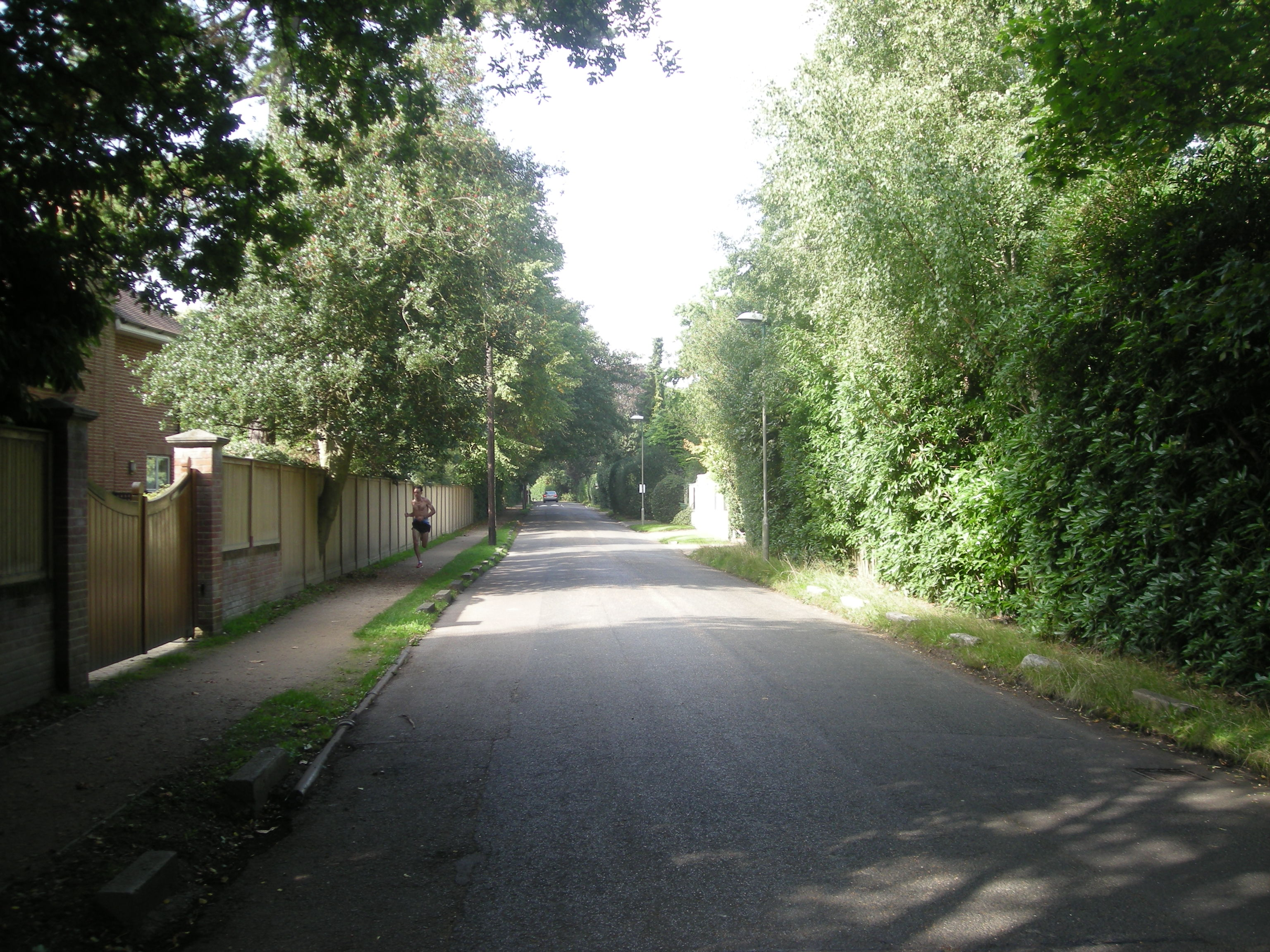
Warren Road looking north from Coombe Neville

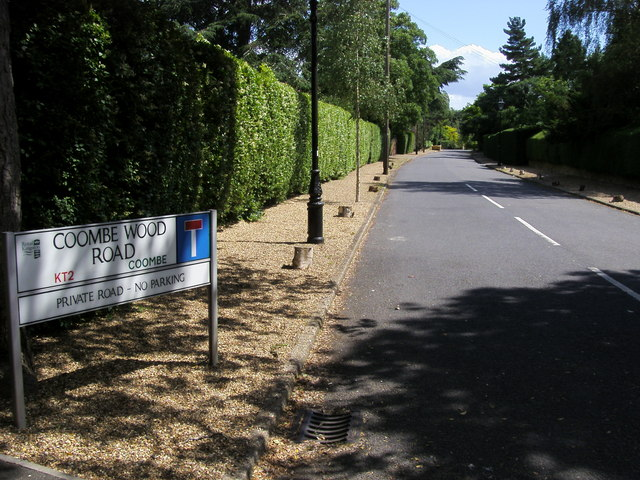
Coombe Wood Road

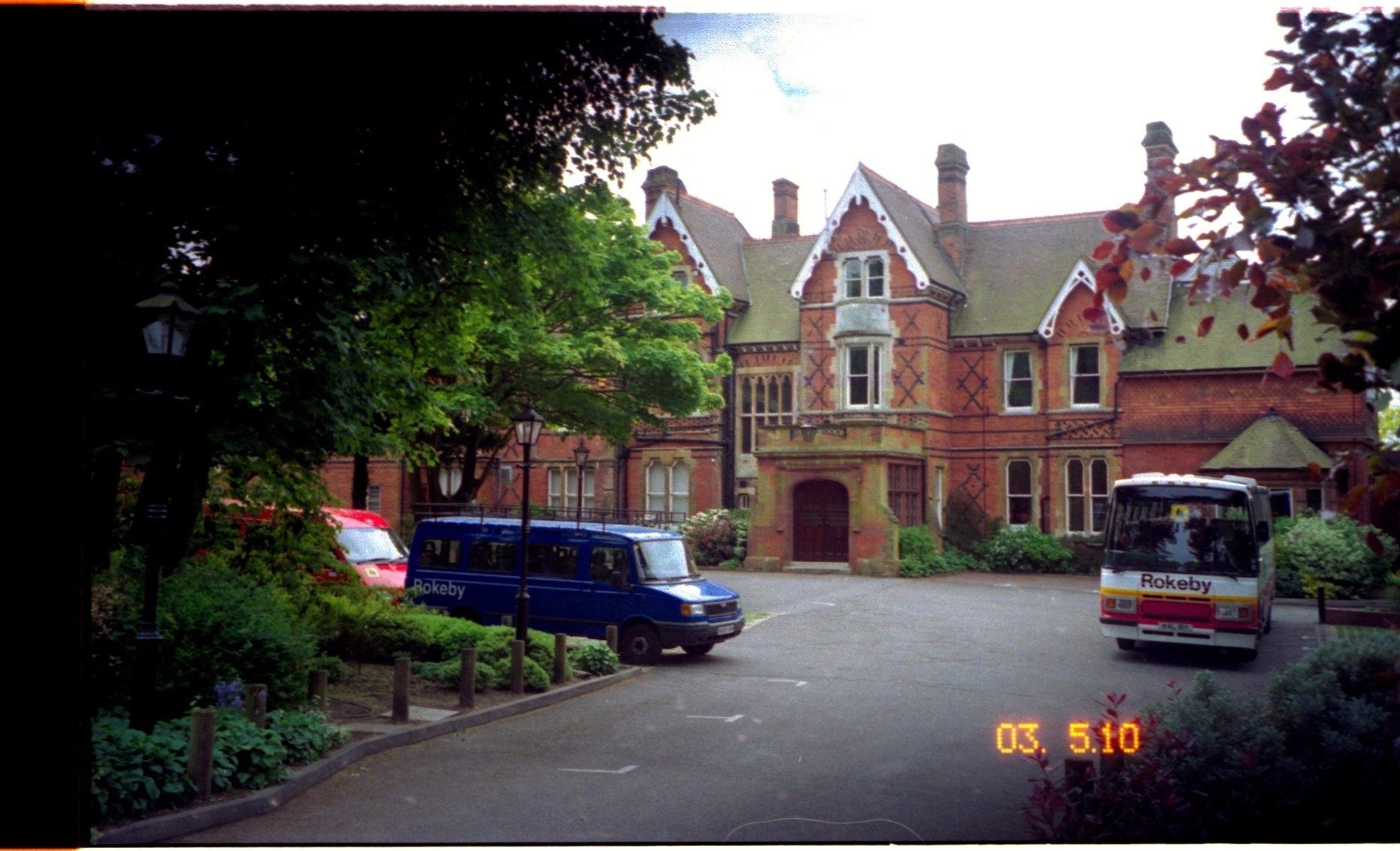
Rokeby School, formerly Coombe Croft, George Road, Coombe

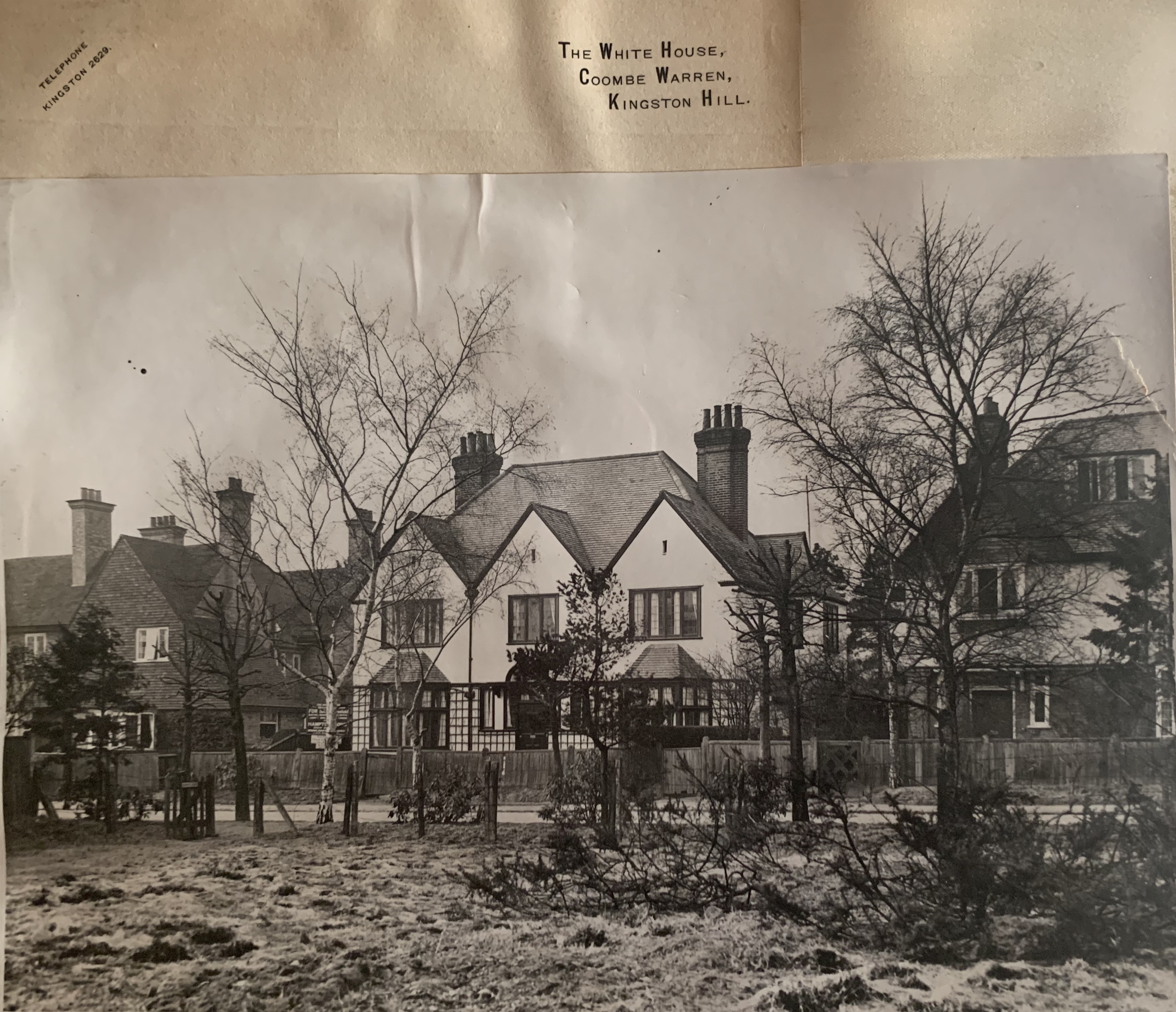
The White House. Formerly owned by Kenelm Lee Guinness

== See also ==
- Lown, Sue and Panizzo, Patricia. 'A Fair and High Locality.' The Chronicle of Coombe Ridge House and the Manor of Coombe. PWP Press, Kingston, Surrey KT2 7DE. 1996. 63 pages. Illustrated by Ian Dunn. ISBN 0 9528594 0 8.
- Other listed buildings in Coombe
- Maldens and Coombe Heritage Society
- Malden & Coombe Residents' Association Ltd.

| Next station upwards | Admiralty Semaphore line 1822 | Next station downwards |
| Putney Heath | Coombe Warren | Cooper's Hill |
