= 2022 Kingston upon Thames London Borough Council election =

2022 local election in Kingston upon Thames

2022 Kingston upon Thames Council election
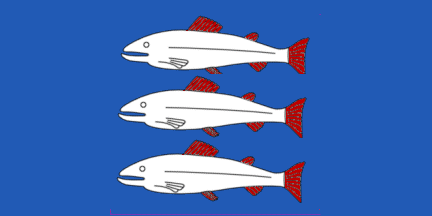
- 5 May 2022

All 48 seats on Kingston upon Thames Borough Council 25 seats needed for a majority
| | First party | Second party | Third party |
|---|---|---|---|
| Leader | Andreas Kirsch | Kevin Davis | James Giles |
| Party | Liberal Democrats | Conservative | KIRG |
| Leader since | October 2021 | May 2014 | May 2022 |
| Leader's seat | Chessington South and Malden Rushett | lost seat | Green Lane and St James |
| Last election | 39 seats, 51.7% | 9 seats, 30.6% | 0 seats |
| Seats before | 44 | 3 | 1 |
| Seats won | 44 | 3 | 1 |
| Seat change | ▲5 | ▼6 | ▲1 |
| Popular vote | 60,732 | 32,179 | 4,935 |
| Percentage | 47.9% | 25.4% | 5.7% |
| Swing | | | = |
- Results of the 2022 Kingston upon Thames council election. Liberal Democrats in yellow, Conservatives in blue and the KIRG in pink.
Council control before election
Liberal Democrats
Subsequent council control
Liberal Democrats

The 2022 Kingston upon Thames London Borough Council election took place on 5 May 2022 to elect all 48 members of Kingston upon Thames London Borough Council. The elections took place alongside local elections in the other London boroughs and elections to local authorities across the United Kingdom.

The Liberal Democrats retained overall majority control of the council, the fifth time in the last six elections that the party has won overall control.

== Background ==
=== History ===
The thirty-two London boroughs were established in 1965 by the London Government Act 1963. They are the principal authorities in Greater London and have responsibilities including education, housing, planning, highways, social services, libraries, recreation, waste, environmental health and revenue collection. Some of the powers are shared with the Greater London Authority, which also manages passenger transport, police and fire.

Since its formation, Kingston upon Thames has been under Liberal Democrat control, Conservative control and no overall control. The Liberal Democrats have controlled the council since 2002, apart from the period between 2014 and 2018 when the Conservatives had an overall majority. The Liberal Democrats regained control in the most recent election in 2018, where they won 39 seats with 51.7% of the vote and the Conservatives won the remaining nine seats with 30.6% of the vote. The Labour Party lost both seats they were defending and received 11.9% of the vote across the borough.

=== Council term ===
A Liberal Democrat councillor, Sharon Falchikov-Sumner, left her party in 2018 after the council voted to close their last residential care home. She joined the Green Party in February 2019. In March 2020, the council leader Liz Green was successfully challenged by Caroline Kerr, a Liberal Democrat councillor who was first elected in 2018. A Liberal Democrat councillor for Chessington South, Tricia Bamford, resigned in December 2020 due to a change in her family circumstances. A by-election to replace her was not held until 6 May 2021 due to the COVID-19 pandemic. The by-election, which was contested by thirteen Official Monster Raving Loony Party candidates, was won by the Liberal Democrat candidate Andrew MacKinlay. Mackinlay had previously served as the Labour MP for Thurrock. In September 2021, the Liberal Democrat councillor Jon Tolley left his party due to policy disagreements with the council executive. He announced that he wouldn't contest the next election, saying "I think we were lying to the public" about the demolition of a leisure centre in his ward. Kerr announced her resignation as council leader in October 2021.

As with most London boroughs, Kingston upon Thames was electing its councillors under new boundaries decided by the Local Government Boundary Commission for England, which it produced after a period of consultation. The number of councillors remained at 48, but the commission produced new boundaries following a period of consultation, with ten three-member wards and nine two-member wards.

== Electoral process ==
Kingston upon Thames, like other London borough councils, elects all of its councillors at once every four years. The previous election took place in 2018. The election took place by multi-member first-past-the-post voting, with each ward being represented by two or three councillors. Electors had as many votes as there are councillors to be elected in their ward, with the top two or three being elected.

All registered electors (British, Irish, Commonwealth and European Union citizens) living in London aged 18 or over were entitled to vote in the election. People who lived at two addresses in different councils, such as university students with different term-time and holiday addresses, were entitled to be registered for and vote in elections in both local authorities. Voting in-person at polling stations took place from 7:00 to 22:00 on election day, and voters were able to apply for postal votes or proxy votes in advance of the election.

== Previous council composition ==
Council composition after the 2018 election

Council composition ahead of the 2022 election

| After 2018 election | | Before 2022 election | |
| Party | Seats | Party | Seats |
|---|---|---|---|
| Liberal Democrats | 39 | Liberal Democrats | 37 |
| Conservative | 9 | Conservative | 8 |
| | | Green | 1 |
| | | Independent | 2 |

== Results summary ==
2022 Kingston upon Thames London Borough Council election
| Party | Seats | Gains | Losses | Net gain/loss | Seats % | Votes % | Votes | +/− |
|---|---|---|---|---|---|---|---|---|
| Liberal Democrats | 44 | 5 | 0 | ▲5 | 91.1 | 47.9 | 60,732 | -3.8 |
| Conservative | 3 | 0 | 6 | ▼6 | 6.7 | 25.4 | 32,179 | -5.2 |
| KIRG | 1 | 1 | 0 | ▲1 | 2.2 | 5.7 | 7,221 | +3.4 |
| Labour | 0 | 0 | 0 | 0 | 0.0 | 12.7 | 16,123 | +0.8 |
| Green | 0 | 0 | 0 | 0 | 0.0 | 7.6 | 9,622 | +4.3 |
| Monster Raving Loony | 0 | 0 | 0 | 0 | 0.0 | 0.4 | 474 | +0.3 |
| Independent | 0 | 0 | 0 | 0 | 0.0 | 0.2 | 213 | +0.1 |
| Women's Equality | 0 | 0 | 0 | 0 | 0.0 | 0.2 | 212 | New |
| Liberal | 0 | 0 | 0 | 0 | 0.0 | 0.1 | 97 | New |

== Ward results ==
Since elections were fought on new boundaries, vote share can't be directly compared with the 2018 results. Candidates marked * were sitting councillors at the time of election.

=== Alexandra ===
Alexandra (2)
| Party | Candidate | Votes | % |
|---|---|---|---|
| Liberal Democrats | Peter Herlinger | 991 | 44.2 |
| Liberal Democrats | Ian Manders | 976 | 43.5 |
| Conservative | Andy Rowe | 754 | 33.6 |
| Conservative | Simon Illsley | 735 | 32.8 |
| Labour | Lizzie Hensman | 255 | 11.4 |
| Green | Kate Worley | 231 | 10.3 |
| Green | Des Kay | 213 | 9.5 |
| Labour | Alexander Lock | 195 | 8.7 |
| Total votes | | 4,350 | |
| Turnout | | 2,244 | 50.9 |
| Liberal Democrats win (new seat) | | | |
| Liberal Democrats win (new seat) | | | |

=== Berrylands ===
Berrylands (2)
| Party | Candidate | Votes | % |
|---|---|---|---|
| Liberal Democrats | Jackie Davies | 1,340 | 51.4 |
| Liberal Democrats | Anita Schaper * | 1,232 | 47.3 |
| Conservative | Claire Harding | 752 | 28.9 |
| Conservative | Jagie Rai | 679 | 26.1 |
| Labour | Johnnie Byrne | 279 | 10.7 |
| Green | Philip Smith | 271 | 10.4 |
| Labour | Lawrence Green | 245 | 9.4 |
| Green | Peter Whitworth | 188 | 7.2 |
| Liberal | Carole Ann | 97 | 3.7 |
| Total votes | | 5,083 | |
| Turnout | | 2,606 | 54.5 |
| Liberal Democrats win (new seat) | | | |
| Liberal Democrats win (new seat) | | | |

=== Canbury Gardens ===
Canbury Gardens (2)
| Party | Candidate | Votes | % |
|---|---|---|---|
| Liberal Democrats | James Manthel | 1,191 | 46.8 |
| Liberal Democrats | Noel Hadjimichael | 1,173 | 46.1 |
| Conservative | Maria Netley* | 767 | 30.1 |
| Conservative | Martin Pike | 692 | 27.2 |
| Green | Fiona Campbell | 395 | 15.5 |
| Green | Linda Sawyer | 262 | 10.3 |
| Labour | Chris Priest | 243 | 9.6 |
| Labour | Bilal Chohan | 236 | 9.3 |
| Total votes | | 4,959 | |
| Turnout | | 2,544 | 46.4 |
| Liberal Democrats win (new seat) | | | |
| Liberal Democrats win (new seat) | | | |

=== Chessington South & Malden Rushett ===
Chessington South and Malden Rushett (3)
| Party | Candidate | Votes | % |
|---|---|---|---|
| Liberal Democrats | Andreas Kirsch * | 1,453 | 49.6 |
| Liberal Democrats | Sharukh Mirza | 1,353 | 46.1 |
| Liberal Democrats | Griseldis Kirsch | 1,335 | 45.5 |
| Conservative | Sue Towner | 1,087 | 37.1 |
| Conservative | Harry Woods | 997 | 34.0 |
| Conservative | Bushra Aziz | 869 | 29.6 |
| Labour | Clare Keogh | 349 | 11.9 |
| Labour | Mawell Freedman | 339 | 11.6 |
| Labour | Alexander Nelson | 292 | 10.0 |
| Monster Raving Loony | Director of Undertaking Brunskill | 90 | 3.1 |
| Monster Raving Loony | Joe Guv | 65 | 2.2 |
| Monster Raving Loony | A.Gent Chinners | 61 | 2.1 |
| Monster Raving Loony | Captain Coiley | 47 | 1.6 |
| Total votes | | 8,337 | |
| Turnout | | 2,932 | 40.4 |
| Liberal Democrats win (new seat) | | | |
| Liberal Democrats win (new seat) | | | |
| Liberal Democrats win (new seat) | | | |

=== Coombe Hill ===
Coombe Hill (2)
| Party | Candidate | Votes | % |
|---|---|---|---|
| Conservative | Rowena Bass * | 960 | 48.4 |
| Conservative | Ian George * | 875 | 44.1 |
| Liberal Democrats | Kim Bailey * | 678 | 34.2 |
| Liberal Democrats | Jason Pethers | 587 | 29.6 |
| Labour | Dave Cooper | 240 | 12.1 |
| Labour | Anthony Murray | 199 | 10.0 |
| KIRG | Kerry Giles | 154 | 7.8 |
| KIRG | Adrian King | 139 | 7.0 |
| Total votes | | 3,832 | |
| Turnout | | 1,984 | 38.5 |
| Conservative win (new seat) | | | |
| Conservative win (new seat) | | | |

=== Coombe Vale ===
Coombe Vale (3)
| Party | Candidate | Votes | % |
|---|---|---|---|
| Liberal Democrats | Andrew Bolton | 1,624 | 44.1 |
| Liberal Democrats | Kamala Kugan | 1,612 | 43.7 |
| Liberal Democrats | Andrew Sillett | 1,475 | 40.0 |
| Conservative | Cathy Adams | 1,213 | 32.9 |
| Conservative | Roy Arora * | 1,163 | 31.6 |
| Conservative | Itret Latif | 955 | 25.9 |
| Green | John Grant | 675 | 18.3 |
| Labour | Liz Meerabeau | 532 | 14.4 |
| KIRG | David Giles | 504 | 13.7 |
| Labour | Ian Parker | 431 | 11.7 |
| Labour | Gareth Thomas | 379 | 10.3 |
| Total votes | | 10,563 | |
| Turnout | | 3,686 | 50.5 |
| Liberal Democrats win (new seat) | | | |
| Liberal Democrats win (new seat) | | | |
| Liberal Democrats win (new seat) | | | |

=== Green Lane & St James ===
Green Lane and St James (2)
| Party | Candidate | Votes | % |
|---|---|---|---|
| Liberal Democrats | Tim Cobbett * | 888 | 39.8 |
| KIRG | James Giles | 853 | 38.2 |
| Liberal Democrats | Simon Edwards * | 845 | 37.8 |
| KIRG | Yvonne Tracey | 757 | 33.9 |
| Conservative | David Condry | 288 | 12.9 |
| Labour | Gerry Jones | 253 | 11.3 |
| Conservative | Suniya Qureshi | 240 | 10.7 |
| Labour | Gary See | 216 | 9.7 |
| Total votes | | 4,340 | |
| Turnout | | 2233 | 48.1 |
| Liberal Democrats win (new seat) | | | |
| KIRG win (new seat) | | | |

=== Hook & Chessington North ===
Hook and Chessington North (3)
| Party | Candidate | Votes | % |
|---|---|---|---|
| Liberal Democrats | Steph Archer * | 1,750 | 54.2 |
| Liberal Democrats | Sue Ansari | 1,627 | 50.4 |
| Liberal Democrats | Afy Afilaka | 1,566 | 48.5 |
| Conservative | Adam Stannard | 909 | 28.1 |
| Conservative | Gia Borg-Darcy | 908 | 28.1 |
| Conservative | Romana Chohan | 874 | 27.1 |
| Labour | Christine Thompson | 472 | 14.6 |
| Labour | Paul Mitchell | 447 | 13.8 |
| Labour | Clive Simmons | 423 | 13.2 |
| Monster Raving Loony | Lady Dave | 121 | 3.7 |
| Monster Raving Loony | Colonel Cramps | 90 | 2.8 |
| Total votes | | 9,187 | |
| Turnout | | 3,230 | 41.2 |
| Liberal Democrats win (new seat) | | | |
| Liberal Democrats win (new seat) | | | |
| Liberal Democrats win (new seat) | | | |

=== King George's & Sunray ===
King George's and Sunray (2)
| Party | Candidate | Votes | % |
|---|---|---|---|
| Liberal Democrats | Mark Beynon * | 813 | 48.3 |
| Liberal Democrats | Helen Grocott | 784 | 46.6 |
| Conservative | Mihaela McKendrick | 566 | 33.7 |
| Conservative | Stephen Cherry | 536 | 31.9 |
| Labour | Nicholas Draper | 272 | 16.2 |
| Labour | Claire Johns-Perring | 269 | 16.0 |
| Total votes | | 3,240 | |
| Turnout | | 1,682 | 40.1 |
| Liberal Democrats win (new seat) | | | |
| Liberal Democrats win (new seat) | | | |

=== Kingston Gate ===
Kingston Gate (3)
| Party | Candidate | Votes | % |
|---|---|---|---|
| Liberal Democrats | Anne Owen | 1,614 | 45.6 |
| Liberal Democrats | Sabah Hamed | 1,504 | 42.5 |
| Liberal Democrats | Farshid Sadr-Hashemi | 1,315 | 37.1 |
| Conservative | Andy Bickerstaff | 771 | 21.8 |
| Conservative | George Callaghan | 723 | 20.4 |
| Conservative | Jamila Bibi | 650 | 18.4 |
| Green | Jennifer Child | 606 | 17.1 |
| KIRG | Helen Hinton | 596 | 16.8 |
| KIRG | Deepa Veneik | 442 | 12.5 |
| Labour | Sally Richardson | 412 | 11.6 |
| Labour | James Leather | 381 | 10.8 |
| Green | Alison Gomez-Russell | 373 | 10.5 |
| Green | Paul Wright | 309 | 8.7 |
| Labour | Ashley Zhang-Borges | 290 | 8.2 |
| Independent | Caroline Shah | 213 | 6.0 |
| Total votes | | 10,199 | |
| Turnout | | 3,542 | 47.9 |
| Liberal Democrats win (new seat) | | | |
| Liberal Democrats win (new seat) | | | |
| Liberal Democrats win (new seat) | | | |

=== Kingston Town ===
Kingston Town (3)
| Party | Candidate | Votes | % |
|---|---|---|---|
| Liberal Democrats | Roger Hayes | 1,243 | 43.6 |
| Liberal Democrats | Nicola Nardelli | 1,243 | 43.6 |
| Liberal Democrats | John Sweeney * | 1,104 | 38.7 |
| Labour | Kezia Coleman | 625 | 21.9 |
| Labour | Charles Bamford | 556 | 19.5 |
| Conservative | Steve Kent | 501 | 17.6 |
| Conservative | Richard Paton | 485 | 17.0 |
| Labour | Martin Ellis | 480 | 16.8 |
| Conservative | Colin Suckling | 436 | 15.3 |
| Green | Fiona Johnson | 370 | 13.0 |
| KIRG | Georgina Hinton | 294 | 10.3 |
| Green | Jamie Brilley | 293 | 10.3 |
| KIRG | Bob Tyler | 284 | 10.0 |
| KIRG | Phil Doyle | 281 | 9.8 |
| Green | John Johnson | 185 | 6.5 |
| Total votes | | 8,380 | |
| Turnout | | 2,854 | 41.9 |
| Liberal Democrats win (new seat) | | | |
| Liberal Democrats win (new seat) | | | |
| Liberal Democrats win (new seat) | | | |

=== Motspur Park & Old Malden East ===
Motspur Park and Old Malden East (2)
| Party | Candidate | Votes | % |
|---|---|---|---|
| Liberal Democrats | Lynn Henderson | 1,132 | 46.0 |
| Liberal Democrats | Richard Thorpe | 1,009 | 41.0 |
| Conservative | Terry Paton | 906 | 36.8 |
| Conservative | Rob Smith | 822 | 33.4 |
| Labour | Alice Campbell | 352 | 14.3 |
| Labour | Amina Rasool | 259 | 10.5 |
| Green | Stuart Newton | 222 | 9.0 |
| Total votes | | 4,702 | |
| Turnout | | 2,461 | 46.9 |
| Liberal Democrats win (new seat) | | | |
| Liberal Democrats win (new seat) | | | |

=== New Malden Village ===
Election was postponed due to the death of Mary Clark

New Malden Village (3)
| Party | Candidate | Votes | % |
|---|---|---|---|
| Liberal Democrats | Mark Durrant * | 1,217 | 42.5 |
| Liberal Democrats | Dongsung Kim | 1,184 | 41.3 |
| Liberal Democrats | Lesley Heap * | 1,182 | 41.2 |
| Green | Lucy Howard | 867 | 30.3 |
| KIRG | Richard Hebborn | 724 | 25.3 |
| KIRG | Marc Tracey | 703 | 24.5 |
| Conservative | Paul Bedforth | 467 | 16.3 |
| Labour | Pat Dobson | 436 | 15.2 |
| Labour | Sean Casey | 429 | 15.0 |
| Labour | Stephen Dunkling | 374 | 13.0 |
| Conservative | Philip Cockle | 372 | 13.0 |
| Conservative | Saad Hindosh | 327 | 11.4 |
| Total votes | | | |
| Turnout | | 2,866 | 42.7 |
| Registered electors | | 6,708 | |
| Liberal Democrats win (new seat) | | | |
| Liberal Democrats win (new seat) | | | |
| Liberal Democrats win (new seat) | | | |

=== Norbiton ===
Norbiton (3)
| Party | Candidate | Votes | % |
|---|---|---|---|
| Liberal Democrats | Emily Davey * | 1,541 | 51.7 |
| Liberal Democrats | Olly Wehring * | 1,495 | 50.1 |
| Liberal Democrats | Susan Skipwith | 1,258 | 42.2 |
| Labour | Marcela Benedetti | 904 | 30.3 |
| Labour | Alex Benn-Amir | 719 | 24.1 |
| Labour | Laurie South | 712 | 23.9 |
| Conservative | Charlotte Gray | 375 | 12.6 |
| Conservative | Alexander Williams | 366 | 12.3 |
| Conservative | Sandira Beekoo | 348 | 11.7 |
| Green | Martin Hall | 239 | 8.0 |
| Green | Charlie Redman | 225 | 7.5 |
| KIRG | Valerie Jenner | 197 | 6.6 |
| Green | Tony Robinson | 163 | 5.5 |
| Total votes | | 8.542 | |
| Turnout | | 2,983 | 43.1 |
| Liberal Democrats win (new seat) | | | |
| Liberal Democrats win (new seat) | | | |
| Liberal Democrats win (new seat) | | | |

=== Old Malden ===
Old Malden (2)
| Party | Candidate | Votes | % |
|---|---|---|---|
| Liberal Democrats | Elizabeth Park | 1,162 | 48.6 |
| Liberal Democrats | Mike Massimi | 1,093 | 45.7 |
| Conservative | Kevin Davis * | 880 | 36.8 |
| Conservative | Jason Hughes * | 802 | 33.6 |
| Labour | Grace Bollins | 263 | 11.0 |
| Labour | Emma Francis | 244 | 10.2 |
| Green | Pauline Howard | 175 | 7.3 |
| Total votes | | 4,619 | |
| Turnout | | 2,390 | 48.4 |
| Liberal Democrats win (new seat) | | | |
| Liberal Democrats win (new seat) | | | |

=== St Mark's & Seething Wells ===
St. Mark's and Seething Wells (3)
| Party | Candidate | Votes | % |
|---|---|---|---|
| Liberal Democrats | Elizabeth Green * | 1,830 | 46.2 |
| Liberal Democrats | Diane White * | 1,726 | 43.6 |
| Liberal Democrats | Yogan Yoganathan * | 1,669 | 42.1 |
| Green | Sharron Sumner * | 1,351 | 34.1 |
| Green | Tariq Shabbeer | 992 | 25.0 |
| Green | Hubert Kwisthout | 925 | 23.3 |
| Conservative | Cameron Davis | 526 | 13.3 |
| Conservative | Calum Paton | 472 | 11.9 |
| Conservative | Ian Wilson | 467 | 11.8 |
| Labour | Naomi Bamford-Hurrell | 463 | 11.7 |
| Labour | Charlie Deacon | 360 | 9.1 |
| Labour | Conor Bollins | 349 | 8.8 |
| Women's Equality | Deborah Olszewski | 212 | 5.3 |
| KIRG | Leslie Jones | 210 | 5.3 |
| Total votes | | 11,552 | |
| Turnout | | 3,963 | 46.4 |
| Liberal Democrats win (new seat) | | | |
| Liberal Democrats win (new seat) | | | |
| Liberal Democrats win (new seat) | | | |

Sharron Sumner was elected in 2018 in Alexandra ward as a Liberal Democrat, but resigned from the council in early 2022.

=== Surbiton Hill ===
Surbiton Hill (3)
| Party | Candidate | Votes | % |
|---|---|---|---|
| Liberal Democrats | Alison Holt * | 1,810 | 53.4 |
| Liberal Democrats | Tom Reeve | 1,629 | 48.1 |
| Liberal Democrats | Amir Khan | 1,596 | 47.1 |
| Conservative | Caroline Bowis | 679 | 20.0 |
| Conservative | Andrew Innes | 642 | 19.0 |
| Conservative | Richard Hudson | 535 | 15.8 |
| Labour | Simon Ayre | 382 | 11.3 |
| Green | Anna Burlingsby | 370 | 10.9 |
| Labour | Greta Farian | 338 | 10.0 |
| Labour | Rebecca Way | 333 | 9.8 |
| Green | Claire Burlingsby | 310 | 9.4 |
| Green | Patrick Goodacre | 291 | 8.9 |
| KIRG | Glen Colegate | 285 | 8.7 |
| KIRG | Hayley Smithers | 225 | 6.8 |
| KIRG | Mo Rajput | 181 | 5.5 |
| Total votes | | 9,606 | |
| Turnout | | 3,287 | 42.2 |
| Liberal Democrats win (new seat) | | | |
| Liberal Democrats win (new seat) | | | |
| Liberal Democrats win (new seat) | | | |

=== Tolworth ===
Tolworth (3)
| Party | Candidate | Votes | % |
|---|---|---|---|
| Liberal Democrats | Mariana Goncalves | 2,047 | 59.5 |
| Liberal Democrats | Andrew Wooldridge | 2,002 | 58.2 |
| Liberal Democrats | Thay Thayalan * | 1,998 | 58.1 |
| Conservative | Jemima Katherine | 608 | 17.7 |
| Labour | Anthony Banks | 592 | 17.2 |
| Conservative | Julian Bedale | 571 | 16.6 |
| Labour | Praveen Kolluguri | 484 | 14.1 |
| Labour | Benjamin Kerkham | 479 | 13.9 |
| Conservative | Amia Tania | 475 | 13.8 |
| KIRG | Kelv Foote | 392 | 11.4 |
| Total votes | | 9,648 | |
| Turnout | | 3,440 | 44.3 |
| Liberal Democrats win (new seat) | | | |
| Liberal Democrats win (new seat) | | | |
| Liberal Democrats win (new seat) | | | |

=== Tudor ===
Tudor (2)
| Party | Candidate | Votes | % |
|---|---|---|---|
| Liberal Democrats | Patrick Hall | 1,321 | 45.5 |
| Conservative | Jamal Chohan | 1,167 | 40.2 |
| Conservative | Ben Mallett | 1,153 | 39.7 |
| Liberal Democrats | Jack Smith | 1,098 | 37.8 |
| Green | David Horgan | 387 | 13.3 |
| Labour | Mark Garland | 234 | 8.1 |
| Labour | Frank Wingate | 206 | 7.1 |
| Total votes | | 5,566 | |
| Turnout | | 2,904 | 56.0 |
| Liberal Democrats win (new seat) | | | |
| Conservative win (new seat) | | | |

== 2022–2026 by-elections ==
=== Green Lane & St James ===
Green Lane & St James, 10th November 2022
| Party | Candidate | Votes | % | ±% |
|---|---|---|---|---|
| KIRG | Yvonne Tracey | 855 | 46.3 | +9.2 |
| Liberal Democrats | Mahmood Rafiq | 647 | 35.1 | −4.9 |
| Labour | Nick Draper | 265 | 14.4 | +3.6 |
| Conservative | Suniya Qureshi | 78 | 4.2 | −7.9 |
| Turnout | | 1,845 | 40.0 | |
| KIRG gain from Liberal Democrats | | Swing | +7.0 | |

=== Hook & Chessington North ===
Hook & Chessington North by-election: 4 July 2024
| Party | Candidate | Votes | % | ±% |
|---|---|---|---|---|
| Liberal Democrats | Lorraine Dunstone | 2,278 | 47.7 | –6.1 |
| Conservative | Gia Borg-Darcy | 1,293 | 27.1 | –0.9 |
| Labour | Kezia Coleman | 773 | 16.2 | +1.7 |
| Green | Lucy Howard | 434 | 9.1 | N/A |
| Majority | | 985 | 20.6 | N/A |
| Turnout | | 4,778 | | |
| Liberal Democrats hold | | Swing | ▼2.9 | |
