= Canbury Gardens (ward) =

Electoral ward in London, England

- Electoral ward for the Kingston upon Thames London Borough Council
- Borough: Kingston upon Thames
- County: Greater London
- Population: 8,263 (2021)
- Area: 0.8780 km²

Current electoral ward
- Created: 2022
- Councillors: 2
- Created from: Canbury

Canbury Gardens is an electoral ward in the Royal Borough of Kingston upon Thames. The ward was first used in the 2022 elections and elects two councillors to Kingston upon Thames London Borough Council.

== Geography ==
The ward is named after the Canbury Gardens area.

== Councillors ==
Election	Councillors	
2022	Noel Hadjimichael (Liberal Democrats)	James Manthel (Liberal Democrats)
2026	Peter Higgins (Liberal Democrats)	Nicolai Due-Gunderson (Liberal Democrats)

== Elections ==
=== 2022 ===
Canbury Gardens (2)
Party	Candidate	Votes	%
Liberal Democrats	James Noel Manthel	1,191	46.8
Liberal Democrats	Noel Walter Hadjimichael	1,173	46.1
Conservative	Maria Jane Netley*	767	30.1
Conservative	Martin Pike	692	27.2
Green	Fiona Campbell	395	15.5
Green	Linda Sawyer	262	10.3
Labour	Chris Priest	243	9.6
Labour	Bilal Ashraf Chohan	236	9.3
Total votes		4,959	
Turnout		2,544	46.4
Liberal Democrats win (new seat)			
Liberal Democrats win (new seat)			

== See also ==
- List of electoral wards in Greater London
