= Old Malden =

South-western suburb of London, England

Coordinates: 51.388°N 0.256°W

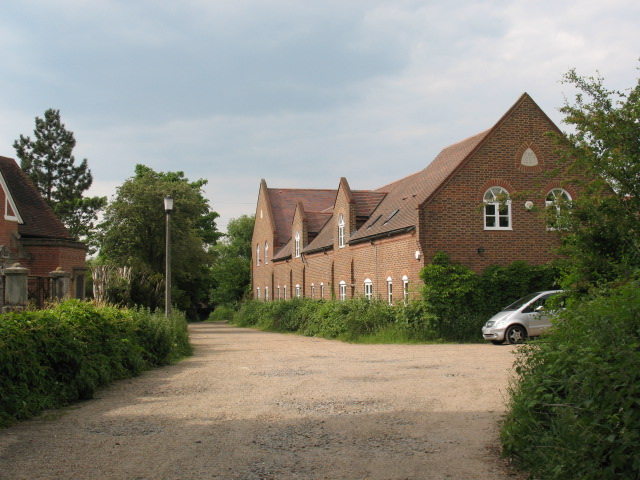
- Church Lane, Old Malden

- Location within Greater London
- Population: 9,012 (2001 Census); 9,431 (2011 Census)
- OS grid reference: TQ215685
  - Charing Cross: 10 mi (16 km) NE
- London borough: Kingston
- Ceremonial county: Greater London
- Region: London
- Country: England
- Sovereign state: United Kingdom
- Post town: WORCESTER PARK
- Postcode district: KT4
- Post town: NEW MALDEN
- Postcode district: KT3
- Dialling code: 020
- Police: Metropolitan
- Fire: London
- Ambulance: London
- UK Parliament: Wimbledon
- London Assembly: South West

Old Malden is an area of the Royal Borough of Kingston upon Thames in south London, 10 miles (16 km) south-west of Charing Cross. It is between New Malden and Worcester Park, along the A2043 road, here named Malden Road.

Malden Manor is an alternative name for part of Old Malden, popularised by the name made up by Southern Railway for its local station built in 1938.

== History ==
The area has a long history as the ancient parish of Malden, derived from the Old English mæl duna, meaning 'the cross on the hill'.

Malden appears in Domesday Book of 1086 as Meldone, held partly by William de Wateville and partly by Robert de Wateville. Its domesday assets were: 4 hides and 3 virgates; 1 chapel, 1 mill worth 12s, 6½ ploughs, 5 acres (2.0 ha) of meadow, woodland worth 1 hog out of 7 hogs. It rendered £7 12s 0d.

St John the Baptist Church, close to the Hogsmill, is a Grade II listed building. The medieval church was built by Walter de Merton, Bishop of Rochester. It comprised nave, chancel and west tower. The flint south and east walls of the chancel survive. In 1611 the chancel's old flint walls were repaired and the nave and the tower rebuilt in brick. The church was restored in 1863 by T G Jackson. In 1875 a new nave and chancel were added, and in 2004 a two-storey extension was completed.

The Grade II listed Manor House, next to St John's, is also mentioned in the Domesday Book; in 1264 Walter de Merton, Bishop of Rochester, founded a college here that was later moved to Oxford as Merton College. The house was later used as a court in the reign of Henry VIII, and in the mid 18th century the house was the home of Captain Cook. In 1852 the Hogsmill River was the setting for the background of Ophelia painted by John Everett Millais.

Malden became Old Malden in 1870, with the development of New Malden, two miles (3 km) to the north in the parish of Kingston upon Thames.

== Geography ==
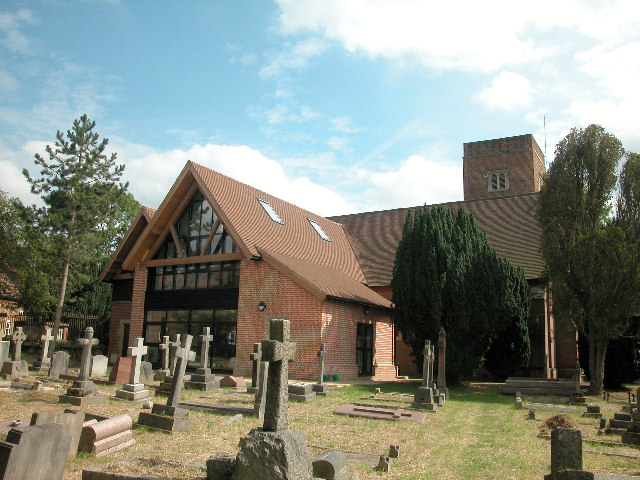
St John the Baptist Church, showing 2004 extension

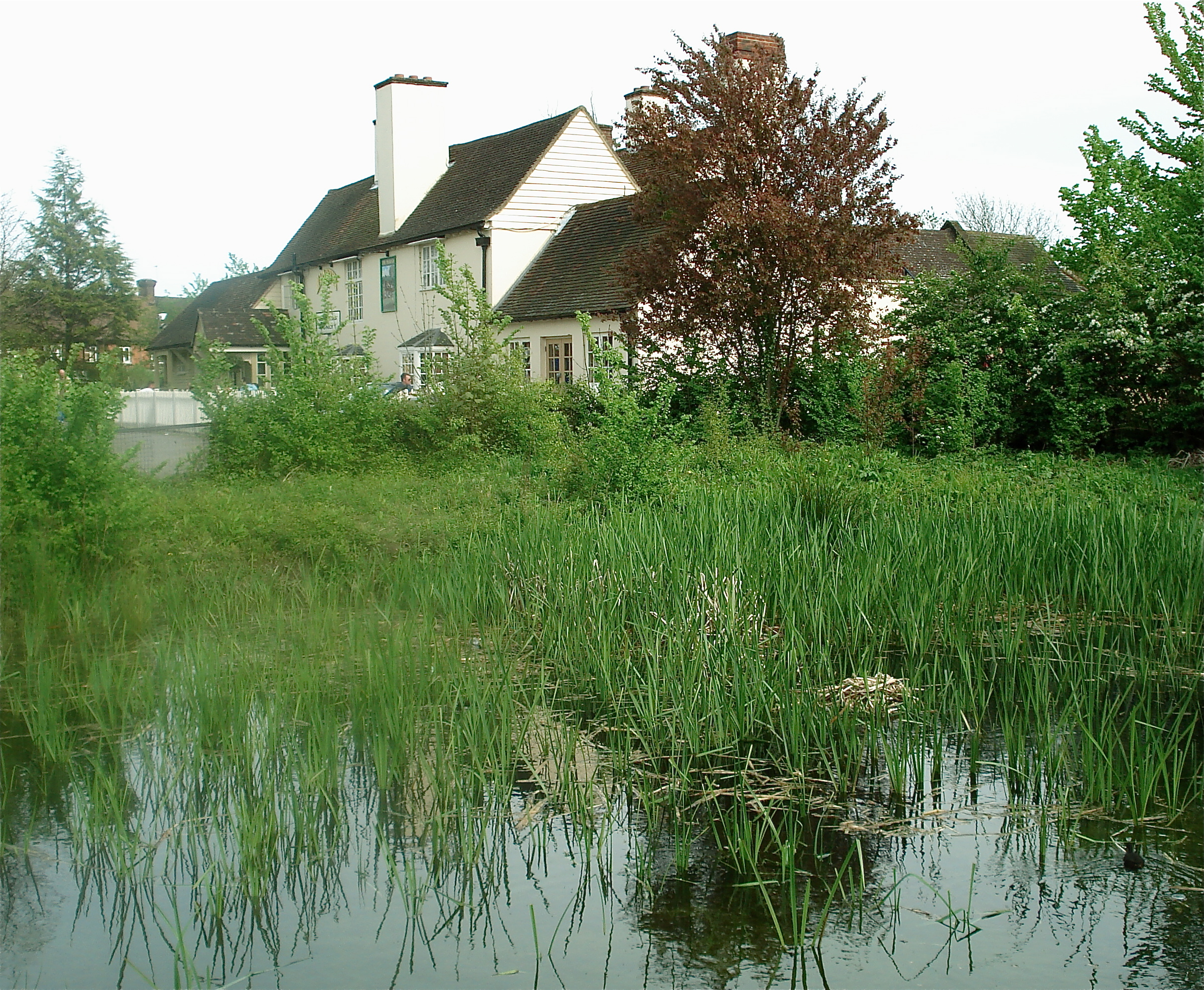
Plough Pond

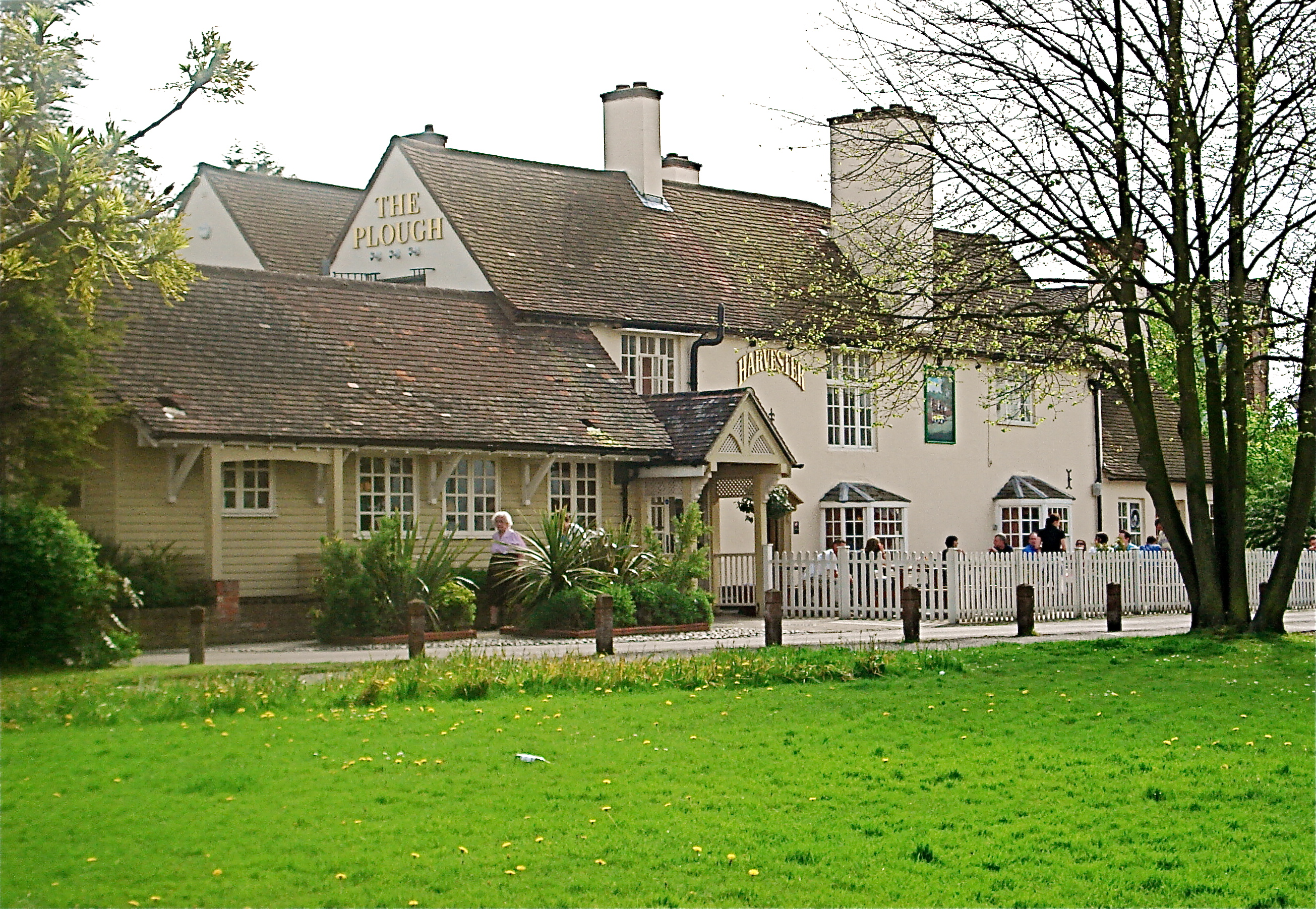
The Plough

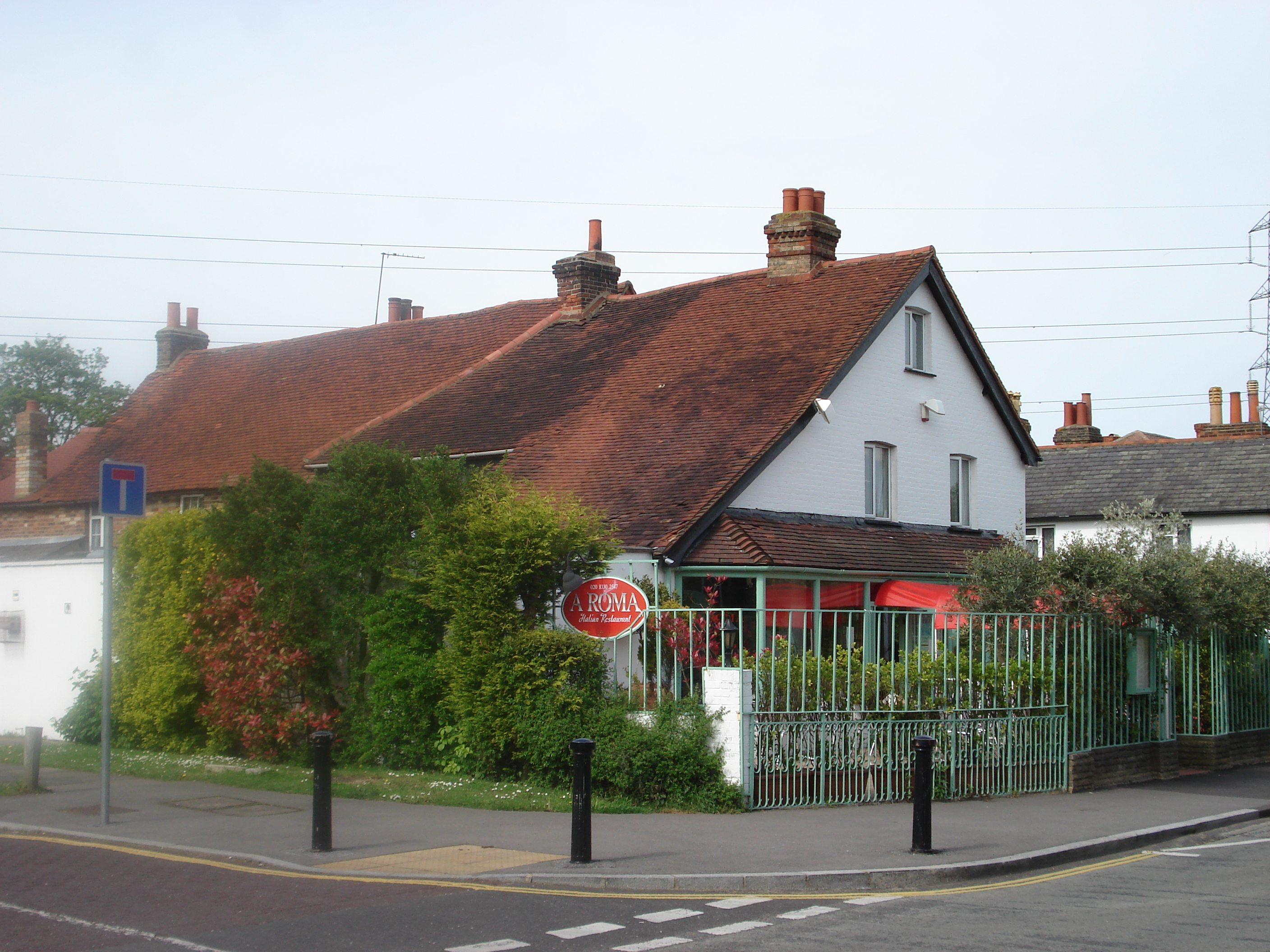
The A Roma restaurant (closed for redevelopment in 2018)

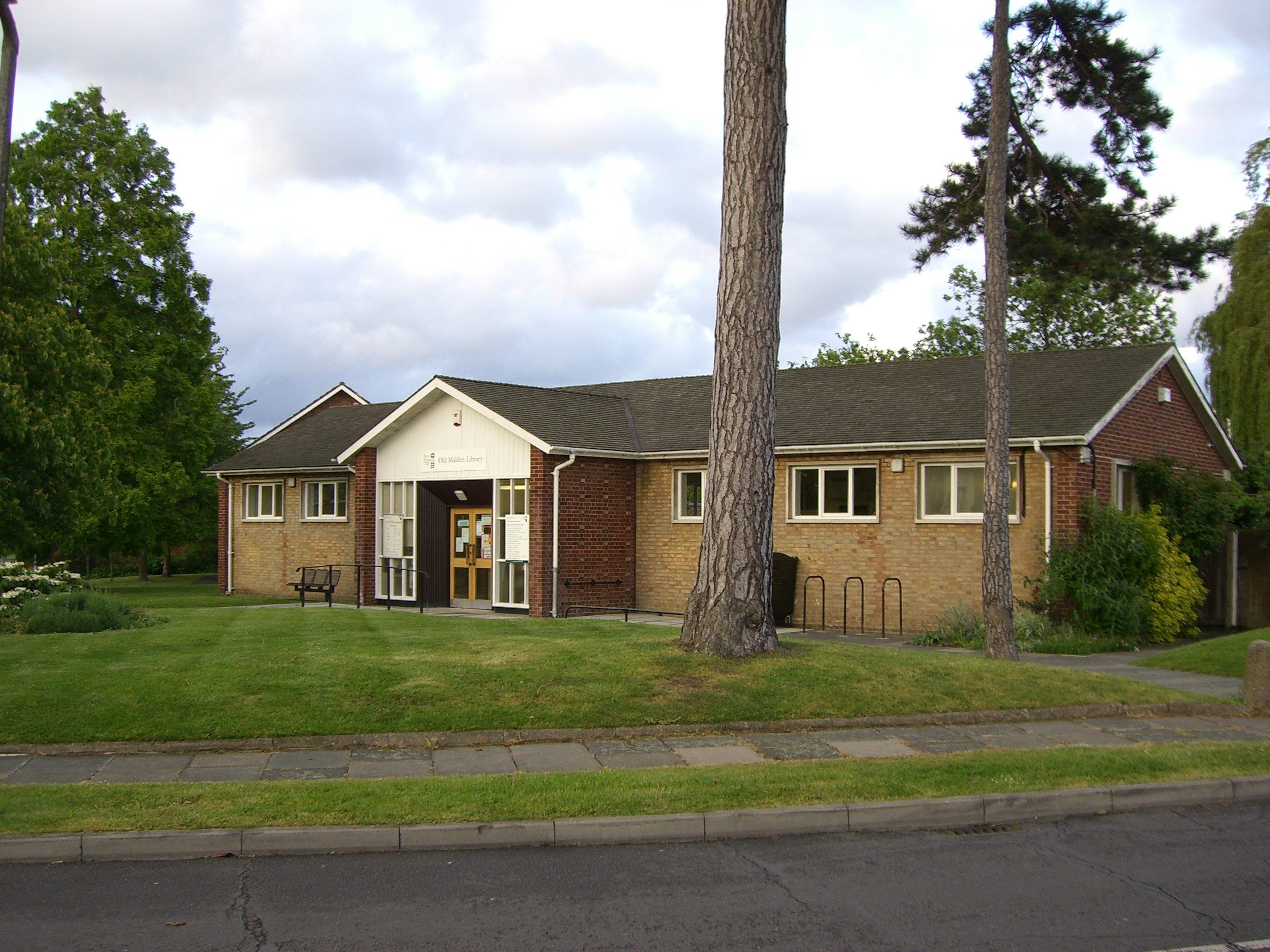
Old Malden Library

At the heart of Old Malden is Plough Green, a traditional village green, surrounded by:

- The Plough, a 15th-century public house, containing a Miller & Carter restaurant (previously Harvester);
- a small parade of shops, which includes the Plough Bakery, Persian, Japanese and Italian restaurants, a hairdresser, a barber, a dentist and two convenience stores
- Plough Pond

Plough Green is used in the summer to hold two fetes; one for St John the Baptist Church and the other for the 1st Old Malden Scout Group.

To the west of Plough Green is Old Malden Library.

The Parish Church of Old Malden is St John the Baptist, and can be found just beyond the width restriction in Church Road. There was a church building here at the time of the Domesday Book. The present building comprises the 1611 re-build, the 1875 extension and another extension added in 2004. The Vicar is the Revd Michael Roper who was inducted to the benefice in 2019.

Old Malden is served by Malden Manor station to the north and Worcester Park station to the south, both 25 minutes from Waterloo. Malden Road, joining the green and Worcester Park station, was flanked by two rows of over forty mature poplar trees until 2010, when most were felled as a safety measure due to internal rotting. Replacement oaks were planted later that year. A minor tributary of the River Thames, the Hogsmill, flows through the west of Old Malden.

== Nearby places ==
- Berrylands
- New Malden
- Motspur Park
- Tolworth
- North Cheam
- Lower Morden
- Ewell
- Stoneleigh
- Worcester Park

== Conservation area ==
Old Malden Conservation Area was created in March 1971, designating the area as being "of special architectural or historic interest the character or appearance of which it is desirable to preserve or enhance". (Planning (Listed Buildings and Conservation Areas) Act 1990, Section 69). It contains two distinct parts, St Johns’ and Plough Green, whose special character is summarised in the designation as:

St Johns’: A medieval village centre above the Hogsmill River, containing the Saxon Church of St. John the Baptist, the site of its vicarage, the 18th century Manor House and ancient fields.

Plough Green: A village green with a pond, a 15th-century public house, and a picturesque group of mainly 19th century cottages. The public house is currently operated as a steak house.

== Politics ==
Old Malden is part of the Wimbledon constituency for elections to the House of Commons of the United Kingdom.

Old Malden is part of the Old Malden and Motspur Park and Old Malden East wards for elections to Kingston upon Thames London Borough Council.

On 1 April 1965 the civil parish of "Malden" was abolished. At the 1951 census (one of the last before the abolition of the parish), Malden had a population of 14,307.

== Notable residents ==
- Ian Hutchinson, Chelsea footballer, lived in 'The Glebe' during the 1970s
- Daley Thompson, British double-Olympic champion decathlete, lived near The Plough
- William Gush, portrait painter
- Thomas Ravis, Church of England clergyman and academic
- Guy Chambers, songwriter

In addition, Millais' created the background of Ophelia in Old Malden at the Hogsmill River. Millais Road is named after him, and several adjacent streets are all named after painters:

| Road Name | Referring to: |
|---|---|
| Gainsborough Road | Thomas Gainsborough |
| Kneller Road | Godfrey Kneller |
| Landseer Road | Edwin Landseer |
| Lawrence Avenue | Thomas Lawrence |
| Reynolds Road | Joshua Reynolds |
| Romney Road | George Romney |
| Turner Road | Joseph Mallord William Turner |
| Van Dyck Avenue | Anthony van Dyck |

== Notable open spaces close by ==
- Wimbledon Common
- Richmond Park
- Bushy Park
- Nonsuch Park
