= Coombe Hill (Kingston upon Thames ward) =

Electoral ward in London, England

- Electoral ward for the Kingston upon Thames London Borough Council
- Borough: Kingston upon Thames
- County: Greater London
- Population: 7,418 (2021)
- Area: 4.157 km²

Current electoral ward
- Created: 2002
- Councillors: 2 (since 2022); 3 (until 2022)

Coombe Hill is an electoral ward in the Royal Borough of Kingston upon Thames. The ward was first used in the 2002 elections and elects two councillors to Kingston upon Thames London Borough Council.

== Geography ==
The ward is named after the Coombe Hill area.

== Councillors ==
Election	Councillors	
2022	Rowena Bass (Conservative Party)	Ian George (Conservative Party)

== Elections ==
=== 2022 ===
Coombe Hill (2)
Party	Candidate	Votes	%
Conservative	Rowena Bass *	960	48.4
Conservative	Ian George *	875	44.1
Liberal Democrats	Kim Natasha Bailey *	678	34.2
Liberal Democrats	Jason James Pethers	587	29.6
Labour	Dave Cooper	240	12.1
Labour	Anthony Michael Murray	199	10.0
KIRG	Kerry Giles	154	7.8
KIRG	Adrian King	139	7.0
Total votes		3,832	
Turnout		1,984	38.5
Conservative win (new seat)			
Conservative win (new seat)			

== See also ==
- List of electoral wards in Greater London
