= Kingston Gate =

Electoral ward in London, England

- Electoral ward for the Kingston upon Thames London Borough Council
- Borough: Kingston upon Thames
- County: Greater London
- Population: 10,824 (2021)
- Area: 1.067 km²

Current electoral ward
- Created: 2022
- Councillors: 3

Kingston Gate is an electoral ward in the Royal Borough of Kingston upon Thames. The ward was first used in the 2022 elections and elects three councillors to Kingston upon Thames London Borough Council.

== Geography ==
The ward is named after the Kingston Gate area.

== Councillors ==
Election	Councillors		
2022	Sabah Hamed (Liberal Democrats)	Anne Owen (Liberal Democrats)	Farshid Sadr-Hashemi (Liberal Democrats)

== Elections ==
=== 2022 ===
Kingston Gate (3)
Party	Candidate	Votes	%
Liberal Democrats	Anne Owen	1,614	45.6
Liberal Democrats	Sabah Hamed	1,504	42.5
Liberal Democrats	Farshid Sadr-Hashemi	1,315	37.1
Conservative	Andy Bickerstaff	771	21.8
Conservative	George William Callaghan	723	20.4
Conservative	Jamila Bibi	650	18.4
Green	Jennifer Child	606	17.1
KIRG	Helen Hinton	596	16.8
KIRG	Deepa Veneik	442	12.5
Labour	Sally Richardson	412	11.6
Labour	James Dominic Leather	381	10.8
Green	Alison Gomez-Russell	373	10.5
Green	Paul Wright	309	8.7
Labour	Ashley Zhang-Borges	290	8.2
Independent	Caroline Shah	213	6.0
Total votes		10,199	
Turnout		3,542	47.9
Liberal Democrats win (new seat)			
Liberal Democrats win (new seat)			
Liberal Democrats win (new seat)			

== See also ==
- List of electoral wards in Greater London
