= Norbiton (ward) =

Electoral ward in London, England

- Electoral ward for the Kingston upon Thames London Borough Council
- Borough: Kingston upon Thames
- County: Greater London
- Population: 11,187 (2021)
- Major settlements: Norbiton
- Area: 1.349 km²

Current electoral ward
- Created: 1965
- Councillors: 3 (since 1978); 4 (until 1978)

Norbiton is an electoral ward in the Royal Borough of Kingston upon Thames. The ward was first used in the 1964 elections and elects three councillors to Kingston upon Thames London Borough Council.

== Geography ==
The ward is named after the Norbiton area.

== Councillors ==
Election	Councillors		
2022	Emily Davey (Liberal Democrats)	Susan Skipwith (Liberal Democrats)	Olly Wehring (Liberal Democrats)

== Elections ==
=== 2022 ===
Norbiton (3)
Party	Candidate	Votes	%
Liberal Democrats	Emily Davey *	1,541	51.7
Liberal Democrats	Olly Wehring *	1,495	50.1
Liberal Democrats	Susan Skipwith	1,258	42.2
Labour	Marcela Veronica Benedetti	904	30.3
Labour	Alex Benn-Amir	719	24.1
Labour	Laurie South	712	23.9
Conservative	Charlotte Karis Gray	375	12.6
Conservative	Alexander Williams	366	12.3
Conservative	Sandira Bye Beekoo	348	11.7
Green	Martin Hall	239	8.0
Green	Charlie Redman	225	7.5
KIRG	Valerie Jenner	197	6.6
Green	Tony Mark Robinson	163	5.5
Total votes		8.542	
Turnout		2,983	43.1
Liberal Democrats win (new seat)			
Liberal Democrats win (new seat)			
Liberal Democrats win (new seat)			

== See also ==
- List of electoral wards in Greater London
