= New Malden Village =

Electoral ward in London, England

- Electoral ward for the Kingston upon Thames London Borough Council
- Borough: Kingston upon Thames
- County: Greater London
- Population: 9,582 (2021)
- Major settlements: New Malden
- Area: 1.674 km²

Current electoral ward
- Created: 2022
- Councillors: 3

New Malden Village is an electoral ward in the Royal Borough of Kingston upon Thames. The ward was first used in the 2022 elections and elects three councillors to Kingston upon Thames London Borough Council.

== Geography ==
The ward is named after New Malden.

== Councillors ==
| Election | Councillors | | |
|---|---|---|---|
| 2022 | Mark Durrant (Liberal Democrats) | Lesley Heap (Liberal Democrats) | Robert Dongsung Kim (Liberal Democrats) |

== Elections ==
=== 2022 ===
New Malden Village (3)
| Party | Candidate | Votes | % |
|---|---|---|---|
| Liberal Democrats | Mark Durrant * | 1,217 | 42.5 |
| Liberal Democrats | Dongsung Kim | 1,184 | 41.3 |
| Liberal Democrats | Lesley Anne Heap * | 1,182 | 41.2 |
| Green | Lucy Howard | 867 | 30.3 |
| KIRG | Richard Hebborn | 724 | 25.3 |
| KIRG | Marc Tracey | 703 | 24.5 |
| Conservative | Paul Ashworth Bedforth | 467 | 16.3 |
| Labour | Pat Dobson | 436 | 15.2 |
| Labour | Sean Paul Casey | 429 | 15.0 |
| Labour | Stephen Dunkling | 374 | 13.0 |
| Conservative | Philip Cockle | 372 | 13.0 |
| Conservative | Saad Hindosh | 327 | 11.4 |
| Total votes | | | |
| Turnout | | 2,866 | 42.7 |
| Registered electors | | 6,708 | |
| Liberal Democrats win (new seat) | | | |
| Liberal Democrats win (new seat) | | | |
| Liberal Democrats win (new seat) | | | |

== See also ==
- List of electoral wards in Greater London
