= Tolworth (ward) =

Electoral ward in London, England

- Electoral ward for the Kingston upon Thames London Borough Council
- Borough: Kingston upon Thames
- County: Greater London
- Population: 11,188 (2021)
- Major settlements: Tolworth
- Area: 1.591 km²

Current electoral ward
- Created: 2022
- Councillors: 3

Tolworth is an electoral ward in the Royal Borough of Kingston upon Thames. The ward was first used in the 2022 elections and elects three councillors to Kingston upon Thames London Borough Council.

== Geography ==
The ward is named after the Tolworth area.

== Councillors ==
Election	Councillors		
2022	Mariana Goncalves (Liberal Democrats)	Thay Thayalan (Liberal Democrats)	Andrew Wooldridge (Liberal Democrats)

== Elections ==
=== 2022 ===
Tolworth (3)
Party	Candidate	Votes	%
Liberal Democrats	Mariana Goncalves	2,047	59.5
Liberal Democrats	Andrew John Wooldridge	2,002	58.2
Liberal Democrats	Thay Thayalan *	1,998	58.1
Conservative	Jemima Lucy Katherine	608	17.7
Labour	Anthony John Banks	592	17.2
Conservative	Julian Stewart Harvey Bedale	571	16.6
Labour	Praveen Kumar Kolluguri	484	14.1
Labour	Benjamin Joseph Gillmore Kerkham	479	13.9
Conservative	Amia Akter Tania	475	13.8
KIRG	Kelv Foote	392	11.4
Total votes		9,648	
Turnout		3,440	44.3
Liberal Democrats win (new seat)			
Liberal Democrats win (new seat)			
Liberal Democrats win (new seat)			

== See also ==
- List of electoral wards in Greater London
