= Kingston Town (ward) =

Electoral ward in London, England

- Electoral ward for the Kingston upon Thames London Borough Council
- Borough: Kingston upon Thames
- County: Greater London
- Population: 10,289 (2021)
- Major settlements: Kingston upon Thames
- Area: 1.769 km²

Current electoral ward
- Created: 2022
- Councillors: 3

Kingston Town is an electoral ward in the Royal Borough of Kingston upon Thames. The ward was first used in the 2022 elections and elects three councillors to Kingston upon Thames London Borough Council.

== Geography ==
The ward is named after the Kingston Town area.

== Councillors ==
| Election | Councillors | | |
|---|---|---|---|
| 2022 | Roger Hayes (Liberal Democrats) | Nicola Nardelli (Liberal Democrats) | John Sweeney (Liberal Democrats) |

== Elections ==
=== 2022 ===
Kingston Town (3)
| Party | Candidate | Votes | % |
|---|---|---|---|
| Liberal Democrats | Roger Mark Hayes | 1,243 | 43.6 |
| Liberal Democrats | Nicola Nardelli | 1,243 | 43.6 |
| Liberal Democrats | John Nicholas Sweeney * | 1,104 | 38.7 |
| Labour | Kezia Elizabeth Coleman | 625 | 21.9 |
| Labour | Charles St John Bamford | 556 | 19.5 |
| Conservative | Steve Kent | 501 | 17.6 |
| Conservative | Richard John Paton | 485 | 17.0 |
| Labour | Martin Christopher Ellis | 480 | 16.8 |
| Conservative | Colin Anthony Terence Suckling | 436 | 15.3 |
| Green | Fiona Johnson | 370 | 13.0 |
| KIRG | Georgina Lydia Anne Hinton | 294 | 10.3 |
| Green | Jamie Brilley | 293 | 10.3 |
| KIRG | Bob Tyler | 284 | 10.0 |
| KIRG | Phil Doyle | 281 | 9.8 |
| Green | John Johnson | 185 | 6.5 |
| Total votes | | 8,380 | |
| Turnout | | 2,854 | 41.9 |
| Liberal Democrats win (new seat) | | | |
| Liberal Democrats win (new seat) | | | |
| Liberal Democrats win (new seat) | | | |

== See also ==
- List of electoral wards in Greater London
