= St Mark's and Seething Wells =

Electoral ward in London, England

- Electoral ward for the Kingston upon Thames London Borough Council
- Borough: Kingston upon Thames
- County: Greater London
- Population: 11,809 (2021)
- Area: 1.528 km²

Current electoral ward
- Created: 2022
- Councillors: 3

St Mark's and Seething Wells is an electoral ward in the Royal Borough of Kingston upon Thames. The ward was first used in the 2022 elections and elects three councillors to Kingston upon Thames London Borough Council.

== Geography ==
The ward is named after the St Mark's and Seething Wells areas.

== Councillors ==
Election	Councillors		
2022	Liz Green (Liberal Democrats)	Diane White (Liberal Democrats)	Yogan Yoganathan (Liberal Democrats)

== Elections ==
=== 2022 ===
St. Mark's and Seething Wells (3)
Party	Candidate	Votes	%
Liberal Democrats	Elizabeth Shard Green *	1,830	46.2
Liberal Democrats	Diane White *	1,726	43.6
Liberal Democrats	Yogan Yoganathan *	1,669	42.1
Green	Sharron Sumner *	1,351	34.1
Green	Tariq Shabbeer	992	25.0
Green	Hubert Kwisthout	925	23.3
Conservative	Cameron John William Davis	526	13.3
Conservative	Calum John Paton	472	11.9
Conservative	Ian Alistair Wilson	467	11.8
Labour	Naomi Louise Bamford-Hurrell	463	11.7
Labour	Charlie Deacon	360	9.1
Labour	Conor Alexander Bollins	349	8.8
Women's Equality	Deborah Anne Young Olszewski	212	5.3
KIRG	Leslie Ian Jones	210	5.3
Total votes		11,552	
Turnout		3,963	46.4
Liberal Democrats win (new seat)			
Liberal Democrats win (new seat)			
Liberal Democrats win (new seat)			

== See also ==
- List of electoral wards in Greater London
