= Motspur Park and Old Malden East =

Electoral ward in London, England

- Electoral ward for the Kingston upon Thames London Borough Council
- Borough: Kingston upon Thames
- County: Greater London
- Population: 6,989 (2021)
- Major settlements: Motspur Park; Old Malden
- Area: 1.569 km²

Current electoral ward
- Created: 2022
- Councillors: 2

Motspur Park and Old Malden East is an electoral ward in the Royal Borough of Kingston upon Thames. The ward was first used in the 2022 elections and elects two councillors to Kingston upon Thames London Borough Council.

== Geography ==
The ward is named after the suburbs of Motspur Park and Old Malden.

== Councillors ==
| Election | Councillors | |
|---|---|---|
| 2022 | Lynn Henderson (Liberal Democrats) | Richard Thorpe (Liberal Democrats) |

== Elections ==
=== 2022 ===
Motspur Park and Old Malden East (2)
| Party | Candidate | Votes | % |
|---|---|---|---|
| Liberal Democrats | Lynn Isabell Henderson | 1,132 | 46.0 |
| Liberal Democrats | Richard John Thorpe | 1,009 | 41.0 |
| Conservative | Terry Paton | 906 | 36.8 |
| Conservative | Rob Smith | 822 | 33.4 |
| Labour | Alice Catherine Campbell | 352 | 14.3 |
| Labour | Amina Rasool | 259 | 10.5 |
| Green | Stuart James Newton | 222 | 9.0 |
| Total votes | | 4,702 | |
| Turnout | | 2,461 | 46.9 |
| Liberal Democrats win (new seat) | | | |
| Liberal Democrats win (new seat) | | | |

== See also ==
- List of electoral wards in Greater London
