= Hook and Chessington North =

- Electoral ward for the Kingston upon Thames London Borough Council
- Hook and Chessington North ward boundaries since 2022
- Borough: Kingston upon Thames
- County: Greater London
- Population: 11,108 (2021) (Note: 2021 Census data reported for 2022 ward boundaries)
- Electorate: 7,845 (2022)
- Area: 2.256 square kilometres (0.871 sq mi)

Current electoral ward
- Created: 2022
- Number of members: 3
- Councillors: Sue Ansari; Afy Afilaka; Lorraine Dunstone
- Created from: Chessington North and Hook, Chessington South, Tolworth and Hook Rise
- GSS code: E05013935

Hook and Chessington North is an electoral ward in the Royal Borough of Kingston upon Thames. The ward was first used in the 2022 elections. It returns three councillors to Kingston upon Thames London Borough Council.

== List of councillors ==
Term	Councillor	Party
2022–2024	Steph Archer	Liberal Democrats
2022–present	Sue Ansari	Liberal Democrats
2022–present	Afy Afilaka	Liberal Democrats
2024–present	Lorraine Dunstone	Liberal Democrats

== Kingston upon Thames council elections ==
=== 2024 by-election ===
The by-election on 4 July 2024 took place on the same day as the United Kingdom general election. It followed the resignation of Steph Archer.

2024 Hook and Chessington North by-election
Party	Candidate	Votes	%	±%
Liberal Democrats	Lorraine Dunstone	2,278		
Conservative	Gia Borg-Darcy	1,293		
Labour	Kezia Coleman	773		
Green	Lucy Howard	434		
Turnout				
Liberal Democrats hold		Swing		

=== 2022 election ===
The election took place on 5 May 2022.

2022 Kingston upon Thames London Borough Council election: Hook and Chessington North
Party	Candidate	Votes	%	±%
Liberal Democrats	Steph Archer	1,750	54.2	
Liberal Democrats	Sue Ansari	1,627	50.4	
Liberal Democrats	Afy Afilaka	1,566	48.5	
Conservative	Adam Stannard	909	28.1	
Conservative	Gia Borg-Darcy	908	28.1	
Conservative	Romana Chohan	874	27.1	
Labour	Christine Thompson	472	14.6	
Labour	Paul Mitchell	447	13.8	
Labour	Clive Simmons	423	13.2	
Monster Raving Loony	Lady Dave	121	3.7	
Monster Raving Loony	Colonel Cramps	90	2.8	
Total votes		9,187		
Turnout		3,230	41.2	
Liberal Democrats win (new seat)				
Liberal Democrats win (new seat)				
Liberal Democrats win (new seat)				
