= Chessington South and Malden Rushett =

- Electoral ward for the Kingston upon Thames London Borough Council
- Chessington South and Malden Rushett ward boundaries since 2022
- Borough: Kingston upon Thames
- County: Greater London
- Population: 9,488 (2021) (Note: 2021 Census data reported for 2022 ward boundaries)
- Electorate: 7,261 (2022)
- Area: 7.395 square kilometres (2.855 sq mi)

Current electoral ward
- Created: 2022
- Number of members: 3
- Councillors: Steph Archer; Sue Ansari; Afy Afilaka
- Created from: Chessington North and Hook, Chessington South
- GSS code: E05013931

Chessington South and Malden Rushett is an electoral ward in the Royal Borough of Kingston upon Thames. The ward was first used in the 2022 elections. It returns three councillors to Kingston upon Thames London Borough Council.

== List of councillors ==
Term	Councillor	Party
2022–present	Steph Archer	Liberal Democrats
2022–present	Sue Ansari	Liberal Democrats
2022–present	Afy Afilaka	Liberal Democrats

== Kingston upon Thames council elections ==
=== 2022 election ===
The election took place on 5 May 2022.

2022 Kingston upon Thames London Borough Council election: Chessington South and Malden Rushett
Party	Candidate	Votes	%	±%
Liberal Democrats	Steph Archer	1,750	54.2	
Liberal Democrats	Sue Ansari	1,627	50.4	
Liberal Democrats	Afy Afilaka	1,566	48.5	
Conservative	Adam Stannard	909	28.1	
Conservative	Gia Borg-Darcy	908	28.1	
Conservative	Romana Chohan	874	27.1	
Labour	Christine Thompson	472	14.6	
Labour	Paul Mitchell	447	13.8	
Labour	Clive Simmons	423	13.2	
Monster Raving Loony	Lady Dave	121	3.7	
Monster Raving Loony	Colonel Cramps	90	2.8	
Total votes		9,187		
Turnout		3,230	41.2	
Liberal Democrats win (new seat)				
Liberal Democrats win (new seat)				
Liberal Democrats win (new seat)				
