= King George's and Sunray =

Electoral ward in London, England

- Electoral ward for the Kingston upon Thames London Borough Council
- Borough: Kingston upon Thames
- County: Greater London
- Population: 5,605 (2021)
- Area: 2.487 km²

Current electoral ward
- Created: 2022
- Councillors: 2

King George's and Sunray is an electoral ward in the Royal Borough of Kingston upon Thames. The ward was first used in the 2022 elections and elects two councillors to Kingston upon Thames London Borough Council.

== Geography ==
The ward is named after the King George's and Sunray area.

== Councillors ==
Election	Councillors	
2022	Mark Beynon (Liberal Democrats)	Helen Grocott (Liberal Democrats)

== Elections ==
=== 2022 ===
King George's and Sunray (2)
Party	Candidate	Votes	%
Liberal Democrats	Mark Beynon *	813	48.3
Liberal Democrats	Helen Rachel Grocott	784	46.6
Conservative	Mihaela McKendrick	566	33.7
Conservative	Stephen John Cherry	536	31.9
Labour	Nicholas Gregory Draper	272	16.2
Labour	Claire Johns-Perring	269	16.0
Total votes		3,240	
Turnout		1,682	40.1
Liberal Democrats win (new seat)			
Liberal Democrats win (new seat)			

== See also ==
- List of electoral wards in Greater London
