= Alexandra (Kingston upon Thames ward) =

Electoral ward in London, England

- Electoral ward for the Kingston upon Thames London Borough Council
- Borough: Kingston upon Thames
- County: Greater London
- Population: 6,413 (2021)
- Area: 1.434 km²

Current electoral ward
- Created: 2002
- Councillors: 2 (since 2022); 3 (until 2022)

Alexandra is an electoral ward in the Royal Borough of Kingston upon Thames. The ward was first used in the 2002 elections and elects two councillors to Kingston upon Thames London Borough Council.

== Geography ==
The ward is named after the Alexandra Road area.

== Councillors ==
Election	Councillors	
2022	Peter Maurice Herlinger (Liberal Democrats)	Ian Manders (Liberal Democrats)

== Elections ==
=== 2022 ===
Alexandra (2)
Party	Candidate	Votes	%
Liberal Democrats	Peter Maurice Herlinger	991	44.2
Liberal Democrats	Ian Manders	976	43.5
Conservative	Andy Rowe	754	33.6
Conservative	Simon Richard George Illsley	735	32.8
Labour	Lizzie Hensman	255	11.4
Green	Kate Worley	231	10.3
Green	Des Kay	213	9.5
Labour	Alexander James Lock	195	8.7
Total votes		4,350	
Turnout		2,244	50.9
Liberal Democrats win (new seat)			
Liberal Democrats win (new seat)			

== See also ==
- List of electoral wards in Greater London
