= Coombe Vale (ward) =

Electoral ward in London, England

- Electoral ward for the Kingston upon Thames London Borough Council
- Borough: Kingston upon Thames
- County: Greater London
- Population: 10,456 (2021)
- Area: 1.725 km²

Current electoral ward
- Created: 2002
- Councillors: 3

Coombe Vale is an electoral ward in the Royal Borough of Kingston upon Thames. The ward was first used in the 2002 elections and elects three councillors to Kingston upon Thames London Borough Council.

== Geography ==
The ward is named after the Coombe Vale area.

== Councillors ==
Election	Councillors		
2022	Andrew Bolton (Liberal Democrats)	Kamala Kugan (Liberal Democrats) (Kingston Independent Residents Group since 2024)	Andrew Sillett (Liberal Democrats)

== Elections ==
=== 2022 ===
Coombe Vale (3)
Party	Candidate	Votes	%
Liberal Democrats	Andrew James Crawford Bolton	1,624	44.1
Liberal Democrats	Kamala Kugan	1,612	43.7
Liberal Democrats	Andrew Sillett	1,475	40.0
Conservative	Cathy Adams	1,213	32.9
Conservative	Roy Sanjeev Arora *	1,163	31.6
Conservative	Itret Latif	955	25.9
Green	John Grant	675	18.3
Labour	Liz Meerabeau	532	14.4
KIRG	David James Giles	504	13.7
Labour	Ian Alexander Parker	431	11.7
Labour	Gareth Brian Thomas	379	10.3
Total votes		10,563	
Turnout		3,686	50.5
Liberal Democrats win (new seat)			
Liberal Democrats win (new seat)			
Liberal Democrats win (new seat)			

== See also ==
- List of electoral wards in Greater London
