= Old Malden (ward) =

Electoral ward in London, England

- Electoral ward for the Kingston upon Thames London Borough Council
- Borough: Kingston upon Thames
- County: Greater London
- Population: 6,698 (2021)
- Major settlements: Old Malden
- Area: 1.306 km²

Current electoral ward
- Created: 2002
- Councillors: 2 (since 2022); 3 (until 2022)

Old Malden is an electoral ward in the Royal Borough of Kingston upon Thames. The ward was first used in the 2002 elections and elects two councillors to Kingston upon Thames London Borough Council.

== Geography ==
The ward is named after the Old Malden area.

== Councillors ==
Election	Councillors	
2022	Mike Massimi (Liberal Democrats)	Elizabeth Park (Liberal Democrats)

== Elections ==
=== 2022 ===
Old Malden (2)
Party	Candidate	Votes	%
Liberal Democrats	Elizabeth Park	1,162	48.6
Liberal Democrats	Mike Massimi	1,093	45.7
Conservative	Kevin John Davis *	880	36.8
Conservative	Jason Robert Hughes *	802	33.6
Labour	Grace Victoria Bollins	263	11.0
Labour	Emma Keeley Francis	244	10.2
Green	Pauline Howard	175	7.3
Total votes		4,619	
Turnout		2,390	48.4
Liberal Democrats win (new seat)			
Liberal Democrats win (new seat)			

== See also ==
- List of electoral wards in Greater London
