= Kingston upon Thames London Borough Council =

London borough council

Type
- Type: London borough council of the Royal Borough of Kingston upon Thames
- Houses: Unicameral

Leadership
- Mayor: Thay Thayalan, Liberal Democrat since 21 May 2026
- Leader: Andreas Kirsch, Liberal Democrat since 26 October 2021
- Chief Executive: Sarah Ireland since 16 May 2023

Structure
- Seats: 48 councillors
- Political groups: Administration (44) Liberal Democrats (44) Opposition (4) Kingston Independent Residents (2) Conservatives (2)
- Length of term: Whole council elected every four years

Elections
- Voting system: Plurality at-large (FPTP)
- Last election: 7 May 2026
- Next election: 2 May 2030

Meeting place
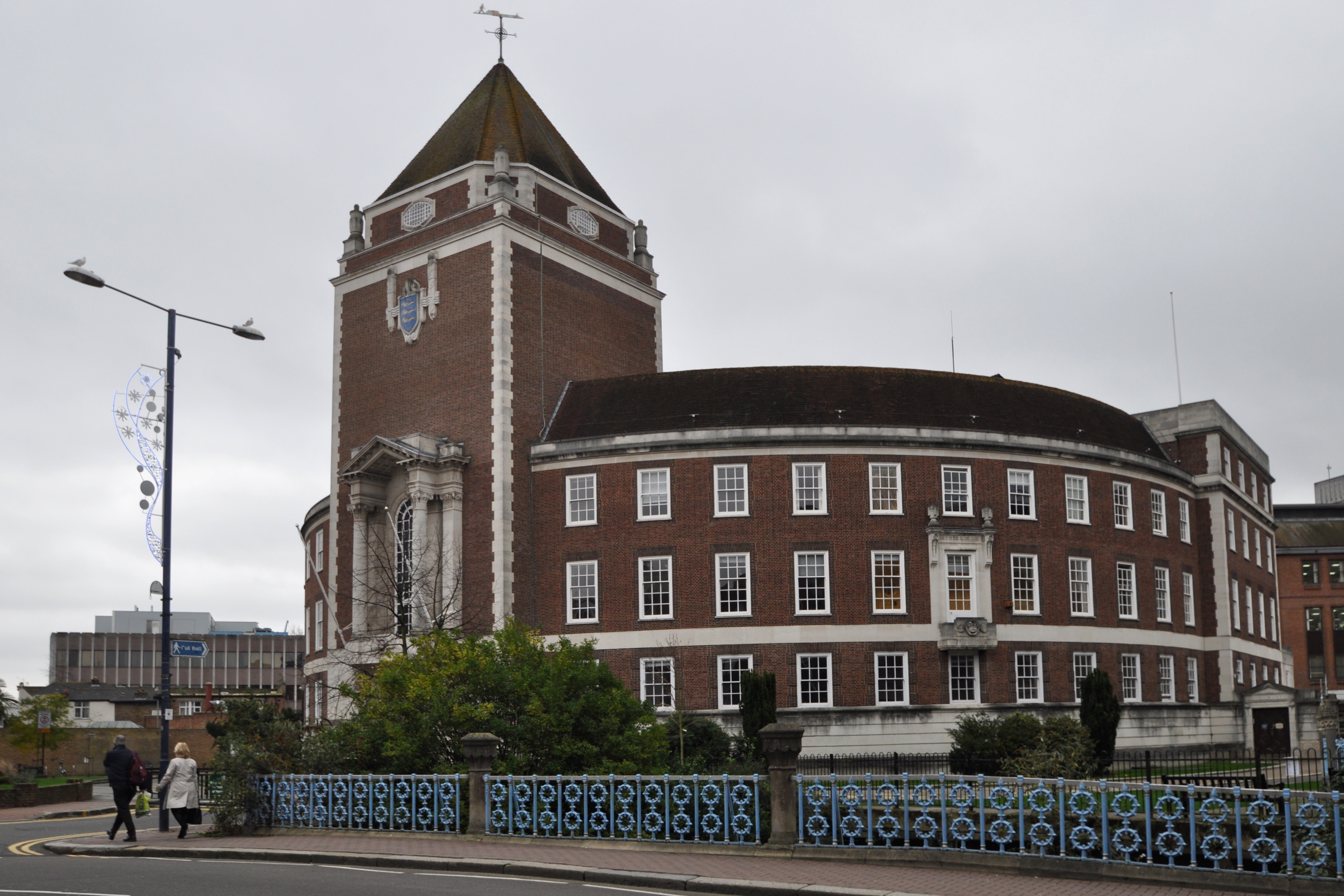
- Guildhall, High Street, Kingston upon Thames, KT1 1EU

Website
- www.kingston.gov.uk

Kingston upon Thames London Borough Council, which styles itself Kingston Council, is the local authority for the Royal Borough of Kingston upon Thames in Greater London, England. The council is responsible for providing services within the borough. The council has been under Liberal Democrat majority control since 2018. It is based at Kingston upon Thames Guildhall.

== History ==
The town of Kingston upon Thames was an ancient borough, having been formally incorporated in 1441, with a long history prior to that as a royal manor dating back to Saxon times. The borough was reformed to become a municipal borough in 1836 under the Municipal Corporations Act 1835, which standardised how most boroughs operated across the country. It was thereafter run by a body formally called the "Mayor, Aldermen and Burgesses of the Borough (or Royal Borough) of Kingston-upon-Thames". Kingston was often described as a royal borough, with its right to that title being formally confirmed in 1927.

The much larger London Borough of Kingston upon Thames and its council were created in 1965 under the London Government Act 1963, with the first election held in 1964. For its first year the council acted as a shadow authority alongside the area's outgoing authorities, being the councils of the three municipal boroughs of Kingston-upon-Thames, Malden and Coombe and Surbiton. The new council formally came into its powers on 1 April 1965, at which point the old boroughs and their councils were abolished.

Kingston's royal borough status transferred to the enlarged borough. The council's full legal name is the "Mayor and Burgesses of the Royal Borough of Kingston upon Thames", although it styles itself Kingston Council. The council counts its mayors as forming a continuous series with the mayors of the old municipal borough of Kingston-upon-Thames as first appointed in 1836.

From 1965 until 1986 the council was a lower-tier authority, with upper-tier functions provided by the Greater London Council. The split of powers and functions meant that the Greater London Council was responsible for "wide area" services such as fire, ambulance, flood prevention, and refuse disposal; with the boroughs (including Kingston upon Thames) responsible for "personal" services such as social care, libraries, cemeteries and refuse collection. As an outer London borough council Kingston upon Thames has been a local education authority since 1965. The Greater London Council was abolished in 1986 and its functions passed to the London Boroughs, with some services provided through joint committees.

Since 2000 the Greater London Authority has taken some responsibility for highways and planning control from the council, but within the English local government system the council remains a "most purpose" authority in terms of the available range of powers and functions.

== Powers and functions ==
The local authority derives its powers and functions from the London Government Act 1963 and subsequent legislation, and has the powers and functions of a London borough council. It sets council tax and as a billing authority also collects precepts for Greater London Authority functions and business rates. It sets planning policies which complement Greater London Authority and national policies, and decides on almost all planning applications accordingly. It is also the local education authority.

== Political control ==
The council has been under Liberal Democrat majority control since 2018.

The first election was held in 1964, initially operating as a shadow authority alongside the outgoing authorities until it came into its powers on 1 April 1965. Political control of the council since 1965 has been as follows:

Party in control	Years
Conservative	1965–1986
No overall control	1986–1994
Liberal Democrats	1994–1998
No overall control	1998–2002
Liberal Democrats	2002–2014
Conservative	2014–2018
Liberal Democrats	2018–present

=== Leadership ===
The role of mayor is largely ceremonial in Kingston upon Thames. Political leadership is instead provided by the leader of the council. The leaders since 1972 have been:

Councillor	Party	From	To
C. M. Cotton	Conservative	1972	1974
Mike Knowles	Conservative	1974	1983
David Edwards	Conservative	1983	1985
Frank Hartfree	Conservative	1985	1986
Chris Nicholson	Alliance	1986	1987
Steve Harris	Alliance	1987	1988
Frank Hartfree	Conservative	1988	1990
Paul Clokie	Conservative	1990	1994
John Tilley	Liberal Democrats	1994	1997
Derek Osbourne	Liberal Democrats	1997	1998
David Edwards	Conservative	1998	2001
Kevin Davis	Conservative	2001	2002
Roger Hayes	Liberal Democrats	2002	2003
Derek Osbourne	Liberal Democrats	2003	Jun 2013
Liz Green	Liberal Democrats	19 Jun 2013	May 2014
Kevin Davis	Conservative	5 Jun 2014	May 2018
Liz Green	Liberal Democrats	22 May 2018	24 Mar 2020
Caroline Kerr	Liberal Democrats	24 Mar 2020	26 Oct 2021
Andreas Kirsch	Liberal Democrats	26 Oct 2021	

=== Composition ===
Following the 2026 election, the composition of the council is as follows:

Party	Councillors
Liberal Democrats	44
Kingston Independent Residents Group	2
Conservative	2
Total	48

The next election is due in May 2030.

== Wards ==
The wards of Kingston upon Thames and the number of seats:

1. Alexandra (2)
2. Berrylands (2)
3. Canbury Gardens (2)
4. Chessington South & Malden Rushett (3)
5. Coombe Hill (2)
6. Coombe Vale (3)
7. Green Lane & St James (2)
8. Hook & Chessington North (3)
9. King George's & Sunray (2)
10. Kingston Gate (3)
11. Kingston Town (3)
12. Motspur Park & Old Malden East (2)
13. New Malden Village (3)
14. Norbiton (3)
15. Old Malden (2)
16. St Mark's & Seething Wells (3)
17. Surbiton Hill (3)
18. Tolworth (3)
19. Tudor (2)

== Elections ==
Since the last boundary changes in 2022 the council has comprised 48 councillors representing 19 wards, with each ward electing two or three councillors. Elections are held every four years.

== Premises ==
Logo of Kingston Council until 2014

The council meets at the Guildhall on the High Street in Kingston upon Thames, which had been completed in 1935 for the old borough council. Most of the council's offices are into two 1970s buildings behind the Guildhall, known as Guildhall 1 and Guildhall 2.

== Criticism ==
=== Size of staff departure payments ===
In the financial years 2015–19, under a Conservative and then Liberal Democrat administration the council spent £2.4 million of public money on so-called ‘golden goodbyes’ to departing senior staff, including:

- Over £250,000 for Bruce McDonald, the former CEO of the council.
- £316,000 to Charlie Adan, former council chief executive, who left her role two months after the May 2018 local elections, reportedly because she clashed with new council leader, Liz Green.
- £160,000 to Roy Thompson, who served as temporary Chief Executive for less than six months, while Adan's successor was found, with his post as deputy being axed as a cost saving.
- £442,000 split between five ‘senior officers’.
