= Kingston Independent Residents Group =

- Leader: Cllr James Giles
- Founded: 16 February 2017; 9 years ago
- Headquarters: 53 South Park Grove, New Malden, KT3 5DA, United Kingdom
- Colours: Pink
- Kingston upon Thames London Borough Council: 2 / 48

Website
- kirg.org.uk

The Kingston Independent Residents Group (KIRG) in Kingston, is a minor political party in the United Kingdom. Launched in 2017 by Mary Clark and James Giles, it formed from a number of residents' groups in the area of Kingston upon Thames in southwest London. At the time, the group claimed to be "proudly founded by those of all political persuasions and none". Sitting councillors Mary Clark and David Fraser defected from the Conservative Party prior to the 2018 election. The party promotes a local agenda that seeks to give residents, towns and parishes a greater say in the future of their town. Until May 2026 they had four seats on Kingston upon Thames London Borough Council, following defections, and formed the main opposition group. After the May elections, they again hold two seats.

The party was first led by Mary Clark, with Helen Hinton as her deputy. Clark died in 2022. The current leader is James Giles, who served as George Galloway's campaign chief for the 2021 Batley and Spen and 2024 Rochdale by-elections, was an advisor to the independent Members of Parliament Ayoub Khan, Shockat Adam, Adnan Hussain and Iqbal Mohamed frome July 2024 to January 2026.

== Electoral history ==
Kingston Independent Residents Group fought their first local elections in May 2018, with 15 candidates standing for seats in the Kingston upon Thames London Borough Council. They did not win any seats.

They fielded nineteen candidates in the 2022 Kingston upon Thames London Borough Council election, receiving 5% of the vote and winning a seat for James Giles in Green Lane and St James ward.

In the November 2022 Green Lane and St James by-election, Yvonne Tracey of the Kingston Independent Residents Group, Giles's grandmother and a life-long resident of New Malden, won the party's second seat on the Kingston Borough Council, gaining it a second seat of the Green Lane and St James ward from the Liberal Democrats. Following a campaign pledge, she gave her first year's councillor allowance of over £8,800 to charity.

In January 2024, KIRG councillor Yvonne Tracey announced her plan to contest the 2024 United Kingdom general election as a candidate in Kingston and Surbiton, challenging incumbent MP Ed Davey, Leader of the Liberal Democrats, in response to the ongoing Post Office scandal, for which Davey was the Under-Secretary for Postal Affairs between 2010–12. Tracey lost her deposit, coming sixth with 2.3% of the vote.

== Campaigns ==
In October 2021, Giles led a fundraising effort by the New Malden residents against the council's failure to reject the proposed nine-storey building to replace a defunct department store in the town's high street. He also announced a petition to switch to direct mayoral elections in Kingston, following their implementation in Croydon.

In September 2023, KIRG councillors Tracey and Giles launched a petition and a direct appeal for Marks & Spencer to replace Wilko in New Malden High Street.
