= Kingston upon Thames London Borough Council elections =

A map showing the wards of Kingston upon Thames since 2022

Kingston upon Thames London Borough Council is elected every four years.

== Council elections ==
Year	Conservative	Liberal Democrats	Labour	KIRG	Council control after election
1964	40	0	20	–	Conservative
1968	59	0	1	–	Conservative
1971	40	0	20	–	Conservative
1974	39	6	15	–	Conservative
1978 (Note: Boundary changes reduced the number of seats by ten.)	45	0	5	–	Conservative
1982	40	7	3	–	Conservative
1986	24	22	4	–	No overall control
1990	25	18	7	–	No overall control
1994	18	26	6	–	Liberal Democrats
1998 (Note: Boundary changes took place but the number of seats remained the same. (Note: The Greater London and Surrey (County and London Borough Boundaries) Order 1994))	21	19	10	–	No overall control
2002 (Note: Boundary changes reduced the number of seats by two.)	15	30	3	–	Liberal Democrats
2006	21	25	2	–	Liberal Democrats
2010	21	27	0	–	Liberal Democrats
2014	28	18	2	–	Conservative
2018	9	39	0	0	Liberal Democrats
2022 (Note: Boundary changes took place but the number of seats remained the same.)	3	44	0	1	Liberal Democrats
2026	2	44	0	2	Liberal Democrats

== Borough result maps ==
2002 results map

2006 results map

2010 results map

2014 results map

2018 results map

2022 results map

2026 results map

== By-election results ==
=== 1964-1968 ===
There were no by-elections.

=== 1968-1971 ===
Berrylands by-election, 15 May 1969
Party	Candidate	Votes	%	±%
Conservative	S. W. P. Barter	1777		
Liberal	D. A. S. Brooke	944		
Independent	E. Scruby	175		
Labour	William. S. Mutimer	160		
Independent	C. Baker	109		
Turnout			50.7%	

Grove by-election, 15 May 1969
Party	Candidate	Votes	%	±%
Conservative	D. C. Leeson	680		
Conservative	F. R. S. Montgomery	661		
Labour	B. G. Holloway	235		
Labour	M. H. J. Evans	220		
Liberal	D. B. Terry	125		
Independent	J. Bloomfield	71		
Turnout			23.0%	

Hill by-election, 15 May 1969
Party	Candidate	Votes	%	±%
Conservative	A. D. Parry	574		
Liberal	B. W. Toft	134		
Labour	M. E. Mace	125		
Independent	M. J. Hope	97		
Turnout			29.9%	

Malden Green by-election, 19 March 1970
Party	Candidate	Votes	%	±%
Conservative	C. M. Cotton	833		
Liberal	R. Brooker	306		
Labour	M. E. Mace	178		
Turnout			46.4%	

Tolworth South by-election, 16 July 1970
Party	Candidate	Votes	%	±%
Labour	J. A. H. Cook	733		
Conservative	A. J. Clare	644		
Liberal	L. M. Chisholm	173		
Turnout			34.6%	

Chessington by-election, 10 December 1970
Party	Candidate	Votes	%	±%
Labour	H. J. Halford	1315		
Conservative	S. A. Leggett	706		
Liberal	J. F. Wainman	97		
Turnout			26.3%	

=== 1971-1974 ===
Malden Green by-election, 1 July 1971
Party	Candidate	Votes	%	±%
Conservative	P. H. Danbury	419		
Liberal	G. H. Morgan	215		
Labour	R. I. Kellett	152		
Turnout			27.9%	

St Mark's & Seething Wells by-election, 1 July 1971
Party	Candidate	Votes	%	±%
Conservative	N. J. S. McLauchlan	1,029		
Labour	E. C. Pinfold	690		
Liberal	R. Brooker	267		
Turnout			27.1%	

Malden Manor by-election, 25 May 1972
Party	Candidate	Votes	%	±%
Conservative	C. E. Dixon	811		
Labour	P. T. Oliver	370		
Liberal	N. D. H. Godden	203		
Turnout			29.7%	

St Mark's & Seething Wells by-election, 5 July 1973
Party	Candidate	Votes	%	±%
Conservative	G. C. Whitney	981		
Liberal	R. Brooker	848		
Labour	E. B. Skyte	553		
Turnout			33.4%	

Canbury by-election, 13 December 1973
Party	Candidate	Votes	%	±%
Liberal	J. R. Philpott	385		
Labour	R. Pringle	286		
Conservative	F. G. Belcham	269		
Turnout			25.7%	

Tolworth East by-election, 13 December 1973
Party	Candidate	Votes	%	±%
Conservative	D. I. Bradford	817		
Liberal	T. A. Channings	648		
Labour	R. Mackinlay	531		
Turnout			42.9%	

=== 1974-1978 ===
Chessington by-election, 11 July 1974
Party	Candidate	Votes	%	±%
Labour	Reginald Sherar	1,081		
Conservative	Michael J. Law	672		
Liberal	Laurence E. Beale	206		
Turnout			24.8	

Grove by-election, 11 July 1974
Party	Candidate	Votes	%	±%
Conservative	Joseph Wrigglesworth	729		
Labour	Murray F. Macrae	728		
Liberal	John L. Tilley	280		
Turnout			40.9	

Joseph Wrigglesworth replaced Cllr Stephens who resigned due to being a Council employee.

St Marks & Seething Wells by-election, 11 July 1974
Party	Candidate	Votes	%	±%
Liberal	Ralph Brooker	1,129		
Conservative	Paul N. H. Clokie	1,013		
Labour	Antonio De Menezes	217		
Turnout			34.3	

Dickerage by-election, 16 October 1975
Party	Candidate	Votes	%	±%
Labour	Audrey M. Barker	387		
Liberal	Kenneth J. Elvey	286		
Conservative	Barrie R. Lambert	218		
Turnout			29.7	

St Marks & Seething Wells by-election, 16 October 1975
Party	Candidate	Votes	%	±%
Liberal	David A. S. Brooke	1,242		
Liberal	Ronald H. Chapman	1,175		
Conservative	Paul N. H. Clokie	1,061		
Conservative	Eunice B. Paxman	1,036		
Labour	Sylvia Denham	195		
Labour	George E. Bayton	184		
Turnout			35.7	

Berrylands by-election, 11 December 1975
Party	Candidate	Votes	%	±%
Conservative	George H. Archer	1,255		
Liberal	Peter J. Sweetman	598		
Ratepayers & Residents Association	Edgar Scruby	188		
Labour	John A. Lee	112		
Turnout			33.9	

Chessington by-election, 11 December 1975
Party	Candidate	Votes	%	±%
Conservative	Herbert M. V. Barker	1,313		
Labour	John B. Woodman	810		
Liberal	Geoffrey Hook	749		
Turnout			36.2	

Mount by-election, 29 April 1976
Party	Candidate	Votes	%	±%
Conservative	Richard A. Knox-Johnston	847		
Liberal	William J. A. Jones	345		
Labour	Norman F. Brockhurst	307		
National Front	Viola Roberts	68		
Turnout			45.8	

=== 1990-1994 ===
Grove by-election, 11 July 1991
Party	Candidate	Votes	%	±%
Lib Dem Focus Team	Andrew J. Bull	1,346	54.6	
Conservative	Francis P. McHugh	711	28.8	
Labour	Leo B. Brightley	338	13.7	
Green	Michael A. Stimson	70	2.8	
Turnout			44.2	
Lib Dem Focus Team hold		Swing		

The by-election was called following the resignation of Cllr Christopher Nicholson.

=== 1994-1998 ===
Malden Manor by-election, 9 March 1995
Party	Candidate	Votes	%	±%
Liberal Democrats	Ian R. McDonald	865		
Conservative	Christopher B. Hunt	685		
Labour	Derrick F. Chester	524		
Turnout				
Liberal Democrats gain from Conservative		Swing		

The by-election was called following the resignation of Cllr Adrian Clare.

Norbiton Park by-election, 28 November 1996
Party	Candidate	Votes	%	±%
Liberal Democrats	Wyn A. Evans	1,020	48.2	
Conservative	Jeffrey A. Reardon	776	36.6	
Labour	David L. Mullaney	320	15.1	
Majority		244	11.6	
Turnout		2,116	48.1	
Liberal Democrats hold		Swing		

The by-election was called following the resignation of Cllr Jonathan Stratford.

Hook by-election, 6 February 1997
Party	Candidate	Votes	%	±%
Liberal Democrats	Katharine M. Reid	1,034	52.4	
Conservative	Timothy D. Brown	516	26.1	
Labour	Michael J. Cowley	400	20.3	
Socialist Labour	Dorothy B. Hayball	25	1.3	
Majority		518	26.3	
Turnout		1,975	52.1	
Liberal Democrats hold		Swing		

The by-election was called following the resignation of Cllr Mary Watts.

=== 1998-2002 ===
Cambridge by-election, 28 October 1999
Party	Candidate	Votes	%	±%
Liberal Democrats	Paul T. Brill	1,429	62.0	+17.2
Conservative	Stephan Shakespeare	661	28.7	−10.4
Labour	Sheila B. Griffin	200	8.7	−7.5
Socialist Labour	John D. Hayball	16	0.7	+0.7
Majority		768	33.3	
Turnout		2,306	39.9	
Liberal Democrats hold		Swing		

The by-election was called following the resignation of Cllr Ian Manders.

=== 2002-2006 ===
Grove by-election, 11 November 2004
Party	Candidate	Votes	%	±%
Liberal Democrats	Rachel E. O'Connor	948	52.0	−5.6
Conservative	Terence W. Bowers	513	28.2	+0.7
Labour	Amanda R. Fitzgerald	213	11.7	+5.4
Green	Terry James	105	5.8	−0.8
English Democrat	Caroline L. Ford	26	1.4	+1.4
Socialist Labour	Richard Cutler	17	0.9	+0.9
Majority		435	23.8	
Turnout		1,822	29.5	−6.5
Liberal Democrats hold		Swing		

The by-election was called following the resignation of Cllr Roger Hayes.

Canbury by-election, 20 October 2005
Party	Candidate	Votes	%	±%
Liberal Democrats	David Ryder-Mills	1,053	50.6	+8.6
Conservative	Geoffrey R. Austin	668	32.0	+7.3
Labour	Christopher R. Priest	301	14.5	−8.2
English Democrat	Caroline L. Ford	38	1.8	+1.8
Socialist Labour	Richard G. Cutler	21	1.0	+1.0
Majority		385	18.6	
Turnout		2,081	29.3	−14.0
Liberal Democrats hold		Swing		

The by-election was called following the resignation of Cllr Anthony Blurton.

=== 2006-2010 ===
There were no by-elections.

=== 2010-2014 ===
Surbiton Hill by-election, 15 September 2011
Party	Candidate	Votes	%	±%
Liberal Democrats	John Ayles	997	39.7	−2.6
Conservative	Nick Kilby	895	35.6	−0.9
Labour	Katie Hill	349	13.9	+2.7
CPA	Paul Pickhaver	171	6.8	+4.7
Green	Chris Walker	81	3.22	−4.7
Independent	James Riding	21	0.8	+0.8
Majority		102	2.1	
Turnout		2516	31.7	
Liberal Democrats hold		Swing	-0.9	

The by-election was called following the resignation of Cllr Umesh Parekh.

Coombe Vale by-election, 15 December 2011
Party	Candidate	Votes	%	±%
Conservative	Lynne Finnerty	1340		
Conservative	Julie Pickering	1308		
Liberal Democrats	Kamala Kugan	908		
Liberal Democrats	Rupert C. F. Nichol	778		
Labour	Nick Brown	526		
Labour	Ian Parker	502		
Green	Chris Walker	122		
Green	Tariq Shabbeer	108		
CPA	Philippa Hayward	94		
CPA	Roger E. Glencross	76		
UKIP	Michael G. Watson	70		
Turnout			43.1%	
Conservative hold		Swing		
Conservative hold		Swing		

The by-election was called following the resignation of Cllrs Robert-John Tasker and James White.

Coombe Hill by-election, 3 May 2012
Party	Candidate	Votes	%	±%
Conservative	Gajan Wallooppillai	1601		
Labour	Laurie South	519		
Liberal Democrats	David J. Knowles	409		
Green	Jean Vidler	235		
UKIP	Michael G. Watson	148		
CPA	Rajesh K. Dewan	66		
Turnout			41.5%	
Conservative hold		Swing		

The by-election was called following the resignation of Cllr David Edwards.

Grove by-election, 5 July 2012
Party	Candidate	Votes	%	±%
Liberal Democrats	Rebekah Moll	710	34.48	−14.89
Conservative	Adrian Amer	687	33.37	+2.35
Labour	Laurie South	440	21.37	+8.75
Green	Ryan Coley	123	5.97	+0.91
UKIP	Michael Watson	56	2.72	
BNP	David Child	23	1.12	
CPA	Jonathan Rudd	20	0.97	
Majority		23		
Turnout		2059	25.69	
Liberal Democrats hold		Swing		

The by-election was called following the resignation of Cllr Marc Woodall.

Berrylands by-election, 28 February 2013
Party	Candidate	Votes	%	±%
Liberal Democrats	Sushila Abraham	948		
Conservative	Mike Head	761		
Labour	Tony Banks	455		
UKIP	Michael Watson	175		
Green	Ryan Coley	112		
Turnout			34.5%	
Liberal Democrats hold		Swing		

The by-election was called following the death of Cllr Frances Moseley.

Beverley by-election, 25 July 2013
Party	Candidate	Votes	%	±%
Conservative	Terence Paton	1033		
Liberal Democrats	Lesley Heap	760		
Labour	Marian Freedman	717		
UKIP	Michael Watson	223		
Green	Chris Walker	207		
Turnout			42.2%	
Conservative gain from Liberal Democrats		Swing		

The by-election was called following the resignation of Cllr Derek Osbourne.

=== 2014-2018 ===
Grove by-election, 7 May 2015
Party	Candidate	Votes	%	±%
Liberal Democrats	Rebekah Moll	1,634	32.1	−1.4
Conservative	Jason Hughes	1,616	31.8	+0.9
Labour	Laurie South	853	16.8	−5.7
Green	Tim Corbett	458	9.0	−4.0
UKIP	John Anderson	241	4.7	+4.7
Independent	John Tolley	238	4.7	+4.7
TUSC	Gabrielle Thorpe	44	0.9	+0.9
Majority		18	0.4	
Turnout		5,084		
Liberal Democrats hold		Swing		

The by-election was called following the resignation of Cllr Stephen Brister.

Tolworth and Hook Rise by-election, 7 May 2015
Party	Candidate	Votes	%	±%
Liberal Democrats	Tom Davies	1,729	34.1	−6.6
Conservative	Ronak Pandya	1,579	31.1	+9.2
Labour	Tony Banks	898	17.7	+0.6
UKIP	Vic Bellamy	514	10.1	−6.9
Green	Nik Way	206	4.1	+4.1
Independent	Mike Briggs	120	2.4	+2.4
TUSC	Dan Celardi	29	0.6	−2.8
Majority		150	3.0	
Turnout		5,075		
Liberal Democrats hold		Swing		

The by-election was called following the resignation of Cllr Vicki Harris.

Grove by-election, 16 July 2015
Party	Candidate	Votes	%	±%
Liberal Democrats	Jon Tolley	1,577	59.9	+26.4
Conservative	Jenny Lewington	688	26.1	−4.8
Labour	Laurie South	223	8.5	−14.0
Green	Clare Keogh	88	3.3	−9.7
UKIP	John Anderson	58	2.2	+2.2
Majority		889	33.8	
Turnout		2,634		
Liberal Democrats hold		Swing		

The by-election was called following the death of Cllr Chrissie Hitchcock.

=== 2018-2022 ===
Chessington South by-election, 6 May 2021
Party	Candidate	Votes	%	±%
Liberal Democrats	Andrew Mackinlay	1,387	37.2	−15.8
Conservative	Sue Towner	1,278	34.2	+3.1
Labour	Charles Bamford	451	12.1	+3.5
KIRG	Michelle Akintoye	378	10.1	+10.1
Green	Adrian Lulham	139	3.7	+3.7
Monster Raving Loony	Undertaking Director Brunskill	16	0.4	+0.4
Monster Raving Loony	Colonel Cramps	14	0.4	+0.4
Monster Raving Loony	Captain Coily	13	0.3	+0.3
Monster Raving Loony	A.Gent Chinners	12	0.3	+0.3
Monster Raving Loony	Baron von Achenbach	8	0.2	+0.2
Monster Raving Loony	Duke Diddy Dodd	8	0.2	+0.2
TUSC	Italo Savastio	7	0.2	+0.2
Monster Raving Loony	Casual Count of Corinthian	6	0.2	+0.2
Monster Raving Loony	Kingstonian Newt	6	0.2	+0.2
Monster Raving Loony	Landlord Rover	3	0.1	+0.1
Monster Raving Loony	Landlady Lucky	2	0.1	+0.1
Monster Raving Loony	Lady Dave Pither	2	0.1	+0.1
Monster Raving Loony	Sam Squatch	1	0.0	+0.0
Monster Raving Loony	Rev Robbie The Radical Recyclist	1	0.0	+0.0
Majority		109	2.9	
Turnout		3,732		
Liberal Democrats hold		Swing		

The by-election was called following the resignation of Cllr Patricia Bamford.

=== 2022-2026 ===
Green Lane and St James by-election, 10 November 2022
Party	Candidate	Votes	%	±%
KIRG	Yvonne Tracey	855	46.3	
Liberal Democrats	Mahmood Rafiq	647	35.1	
Labour	Nick Draper	265	14.4	
Conservative	Suniya Qureshi	78	4.2	
Majority		208	11.3	
Turnout		1,845		
KIRG gain from Liberal Democrats		Swing		

The by-election was called following the resignation of Cllr Tim Cobbett.

Hook and Chessington North by-election, 4 July 2024
Party	Candidate	Votes	%	±%
Liberal Democrats	Lorraine Dunstone	2,278	47.7	
Conservative	Gia Borg-Darcy	1,293	27.1	
Labour	Kezia Coleman	773	16.2	
Green	Lucy Howard	434	9.1	
Majority		985	20.6	
Turnout		4,778		
Liberal Democrats hold		Swing		

The by-election was called following the resignation of Cllr Steph Archer.
