= Canbury (ward) =

Electoral ward in London, 1965 to 2022

- Former electoral ward for the Kingston upon Thames London Borough Council
- Canbury ward boundaries from 2002 to 2022
- Borough: Kingston upon Thames
- County: Greater London
- Population: 12,373 (2011)
- Electorate: 9,266 (2018)

Former electoral ward
- Created: 1965
- Abolished: 2022
- Councillors: 3
- Replaced by: Canbury Gardens, Coombe Hill, Kingston Gate, Tudor
- GSS code: E05000403 (2002–2022)

Canbury was an electoral ward in the Royal Borough of Kingston upon Thames from 1965 to 2022. The ward was first used in the 1964 elections and last used for the 2018 elections. It returned three councillors to Kingston upon Thames London Borough Council.

== 2002–2022 Kingston council elections ==
There was a revision of ward boundaries in Kingston upon Thames in 2002.

=== 2018 election ===
This last election took place on 3 May 2018.

2018 Kingston upon Thames London Borough Council election: Canbury
Party	Candidate	Votes	%	±%
Liberal Democrats	Olivia Boult	2,224	48.6	+25.9
Liberal Democrats	Zain Abbas	2,145	46.9	+25.3
Liberal Democrats	Caroline Kerr	2,121	46.4	+25.5
Conservative	Andrea Louise Craig	1,643	35.9	−0.8
Conservative	Khadija Umbarin Rahman	1,270	27.8	−7.4
Conservative	Samuel Shethran	1,248	27.3	−4.8
Labour	Clair Siobhan Keogh	482	10.5	−5.2
Labour	Chris Priest	429	9.4	−3.0
Labour	Jean Haizal Saleh Sarhadar	395	8.6	−2.6
KIRG	Caroline Shah Scott	391	8.5	N/A
Green	Joe Holder	331	7.2	−15.9
Green	Mark Greaves	325	7.1	−14.6
Green	Karen Lacey	291	6.4	−8.6
Total votes				
Liberal Democrats gain from Conservative		Swing		
Liberal Democrats gain from Conservative		Swing		
Liberal Democrats gain from Conservative		Swing		

=== 2014 election ===
The election took place on 22 May 2014.

2014 Kingston upon Thames London Borough Council election: Canbury
Party	Candidate	Votes	%	±%
Conservative	Andrea Craig	1,419	36.7	−3.2
Conservative	Geoff Austin	1,360	35.2	−3.9
Conservative	David Glasspool	1,241	32.1	−4.4
Green	Ryan Coley	891	23.1	+7.7
Liberal Democrats	Rebekah Moll	877	22.7	−19.6
Green	Charlie Redman	839	21.7	N/A
Liberal Democrats	Dan Falchikov	833	21.6	−11.4
Liberal Democrats	Andrew King	809	20.9	−9.9
Labour	Tony Cottrell	606	15.7	+3.5
Green	Tariq Shabbeer	580	15.0	N/A
Labour	Colin Startup	477	12.4	+0.8
Labour	Nisha Tailor	431	11.2	+0.4
UKIP	John Anderson	391	10.1	N/A
Independent	Timothy Dennen	188	4.9	−37.4
Conservative gain from Liberal Democrats		Swing		
Conservative hold		Swing		
Conservative hold		Swing		

=== 2010 election ===
The election on 6 May 2010 took place on the same day as the United Kingdom general election.

2010 Kingston upon Thames London Borough Council election: Canbury
Party	Candidate	Votes	%	±%
Liberal Democrats	Timothy Dennen	2,469	42.3	+2.4
Conservative	Andrea Craig	2,333	39.9	+1.1
Conservative	Geoffrey Austin	2,283	39.1	−1.3
Conservative	Hamish Pritchard	2,131	36.5	−1.4
Liberal Democrats	Maha Alfakier	1,927	33.0	−4.1
Liberal Democrats	Bart Ricketts	1,801	30.8	−4.6
Green	Johanna Hunt	899	15.4	−1.4
Labour	Katie Hill	711	12.2	−0.3
Labour	Colin Startup	678	11.6	+0.5
Labour	Chris Priest	630	10.8	+0.1
Liberal Democrats hold		Swing		
Conservative hold		Swing		
Conservative hold		Swing		

=== 2006 election ===
The election took place on 4 May 2006.

2006 Kingston upon Thames London Borough Council election: Canbury
Party	Candidate	Votes	%	±%
Conservative	Geoffrey Austin	1,305	40.4	+14.8
Liberal Democrats	David Ryder-Mills	1,290	39.9	−3.7
Conservative	David Glasscock	1,254	38.8	+14.3
Conservative	Romana Chohan	1,225	37.9	+13.6
Liberal Democrats	Lally Malik	1,199	37.1	−4.3
Liberal Democrats	Trevor Heap	1,143	35.4	−3.8
Green	Carol Vagg	543	16.8	+8.0
Labour	Norma Brewer	403	12.5	−11.1
Labour	Richard Hyde	358	11.1	−11.0
Labour	Christopher Priest	347	10.7	−11.1
Socialist	Oliver Bond	80	2.5	N/A
Turnout		3,241	43.8	+0.5
Conservative gain from Liberal Democrats		Swing		
Liberal Democrats hold		Swing		
Conservative gain from Liberal Democrats		Swing		

=== 2005 by-election ===
The by-election was held on 20 October 2005, following the resignation of Anthony Blurton.

2005 Canbury by-election
Party	Candidate	Votes	%	±%
Liberal Democrats	David Ryder-Mills	1,053	50.6	+8.6
Conservative	Geoffrey Austin	668	32.0	+7.3
Labour	Christopher Priest	301	14.5	−8.2
English Democrat	Caroline Ford	38	1.8	+1.8
Socialist Labour	Richard Cutler	21	1.0	+1.0
Majority		385	18.6	
Turnout		2,081	29.3	−14.0
Liberal Democrats hold		Swing		

=== 2002 election ===
The election took place on 2 May 2002.

2002 Kingston upon Thames London Borough Council election: Canbury
Party	Candidate	Votes	%	±%
Liberal Democrats	Anthony Blurton	1,278	43.6	
Liberal Democrats	Penelope Shelton	1,215	41.4	
Liberal Democrats	Amtul Malik	1,149	39.2	
Conservative	Andrew Lee	751	25.6	
Conservative	Karen Gray	718	24.5	
Conservative	James Griffin	714	24.3	
Labour	Norma Brewer	692	23.6	
Labour	Christopher Priest	649	22.1	
Labour	Daljit Sehbai	639	21.8	
Green	Brian Holmes	259	8.8	
Green	John Southgate	234	8.0	
Green	Gordon Masterton	177	6.0	
CPA	Abigail Hernan	62	2.1	
Turnout		8,537	43.3	
Liberal Democrats win (new boundaries)				
Liberal Democrats win (new boundaries)				
Liberal Democrats win (new boundaries)				

== 1978–2002 Kingston council elections ==
Canbury ward boundaries from 1978 to 2002

There was a revision of ward boundaries in Kingston upon Thames in 1978.

=== 1998 election ===
The election took place on 7 May 1998.

=== 1994 election ===
The election took place on 5 May 1994.

=== 1990 election ===
The election took place on 3 May 1990.

1990 Kingston upon Thames London Borough Council election: Canbury
Party	Candidate	Votes	%
Lib Dem Focus Team	John Tilley	1,389	41.63
Lib Dem Focus Team	Barbara Janke	1,381	
Lib Dem Focus Team	David J. Twigg	1,279	
Labour	Barry G. Bennett	1,044	31.05
Labour	Robert H. Markless	1,021	
Labour	Matthew F. Rees	956	
Conservative	Roy S.E. Beat	619	18.53
Conservative	Nicholas J.H. Wilson	613	
Conservative	Derrick B. Mastrocola	571	
Green	Susanna M. Hawkins	285	8.79
Registered electors		5,104	
Turnout		3,207	62.83
Rejected ballots		2	0.06
Lib Dem Focus Team hold			
Lib Dem Focus Team hold			
Lib Dem Focus Team hold			

=== 1986 election ===
The election took place on 8 May 1986.

=== 1982 election ===
The election took place on 6 May 1982.

=== 1978 election ===
The election took place on 4 May 1978.

== 1964–1978 Kingston council elections ==
=== 1974 election ===
The election took place on 2 May 1974.

=== 1973 by-election ===
The by-election took place on 13 December 1973.

1973 Canbury by-election
Party	Candidate	Votes	%	±%
Liberal	J. Philpott	385		
Labour	R. Pringle	286		
Conservative	F. Belcham	269		
Turnout			25.7%	

=== 1971 election ===
The election took place on 13 May 1971.

=== 1968 election ===
The election took place on 9 May 1968.

=== 1964 election ===
The election took place on 7 May 1964.
