= Rachel O'Connor =

Rachel O'Connor may refer to:

- Rachel O'Connor, character in Tales of the Slayers: Broken Bottle of Djinn
- Rachel O'Connor, candidate in Kingston upon Thames local elections
- Rachel O'Connor in 2013 Canadian Junior Curling Championships
- Rachel O'Connor, a producing partner of Amy Pascal
- Rachael O'Connor, singer
