= 1990 Kingston upon Thames London Borough Council election =

1990 local election in England

- 3 May 1990

50 seats up for election to Kingston upon Thames London Borough Council 26 seats needed for a majority
- Registered: 94,678
- Turnout: 53,403, 56.41%

	First party	Second party	Third party
Leader	Paul N.H. Clokie	Unknown	Unknown
Party	Conservative	Liberal Democrats	Labour
Leader since	1990	Unknown	Unknown
Leader's seat	Berrylands	Unknown	Unknown
Seats before	24	22	4
Seats won	25	18	7
Seat change	▲1	▼4	▲3
Popular vote	54,044	39,433	33,784
Percentage	41.52%	30.30%	25.96%
Council control before election
No Overall Control
Council control after election
No Overall Control

The 1990 Kingston upon Thames Council election took place on 3 May 1990 to elect members of Kingston upon Thames London Borough Council in London, England. The whole council was up for election and the council stayed in no overall control.

== Election result ==
1990 Kingston upon Thames London Borough Council elections
Party	Seats	Gains	Losses	Net gain/loss	Seats %	Votes %	Votes	+/−
Conservative	25	6	5	▲1	50.00	41.52	54,044	
Liberal Democrats	18	3	7	▼4	36.00	30.30	39,433	
Labour	7	3	0	▲3	14.00	25.96	33,784	
Green	0	0	0	Steady	0.00	1.68	2,188	
Independent	0	0	0	Steady	0.00	0.54	706	
Total	50						130,155	

↓
7	18	25
Labour	Liberal Democrats	Conservative

== Ward results ==
(*) - Indicates an incumbent candidate

=== Berrylands ===
Berrylands (3)
Party	Candidate	Votes	%
Conservative	Peter C. Gray*	1,775	55.48
Conservative	Edna M. Gray*	1,773	
Conservative	Paul N.H. Clokie*	1,736	
Labour	John A. Lee	668	19.12
Labour	Sylvia Denham	595	
Labour	William S. Mutimer	557	
Lib Dem Focus Team	Rosemary A. Tatler	469	14.27
Liberal Democrats	Rusi Kerr-Waller	449	
Liberal Democrats	Sallu A. Bernstone	441	
Independent	Edgar Scruby	394	11.12
Independent	Peter G. Bell	312	
Registered electors		6,231	
Turnout		3,255	52.24
Rejected ballots		12	0.37
Conservative hold			
Conservative hold			
Conservative hold			

=== Burlington ===
Burlington (2)
Party	Candidate	Votes	%
Lib Dem Focus Team	Derek R. Osbourne*	1,166	49.80
Lib Dem Focus Team	Adrian J. McLeay	1,139	
Conservative	Douglas V.P. Frost	768	33.09
Conservative	Michael G. Amson	764	
Labour	Barry J. Whatley	400	17.11
Labour	Mark D. Agnew	391	
Registered electors		4,047	
Turnout		2,457	60.71
Rejected ballots		2	0.08
Lib Dem Focus Team hold			
Lib Dem Focus Team hold			

=== Cambridge ===
Cambridge (3)
Party	Candidate	Votes	%
Lib Dem Focus Team	Julie A. Haines*	1,647	47.81
Lib Dem Focus Team	Ian Manders*	1,641	
Lib Dem Focus Team	Claire V. Jackson*	1,625	
Conservative	Roderick F. Scott	1,384	39.87
Conservative	Peter F. Groves	1,361	
Conservative	John S. Moloney	1,354	
Labour	Audrey M. Barker	438	12.32
Labour	Christopher R. Priest	425	
Labour	Rosemary L. Webb	404	
Registered electors		5,586	
Turnout		3,593	64.32
Rejected ballots		5	0.14
Lib Dem Focus Team hold			
Lib Dem Focus Team hold			
Lib Dem Focus Team hold			

=== Canbury ===
Canbury (3)
Party	Candidate	Votes	%
Lib Dem Focus Team	John Tilley*	1,389	41.63
Lib Dem Focus Team	Barbara Janke*	1,381	
Lib Dem Focus Team	David J. Twigg	1,279	
Labour	Barry G. Bennett	1,044	31.05
Labour	Robert H. Markless	1,021	
Labour	Matthew F. Rees	956	
Conservative	Roy S.E. Beat	619	18.53
Conservative	Nicholas J.H. Wilson	613	
Conservative	Derrick B. Mastrocola	571	
Green	Susanna M. Hawkins	285	8.79
Registered electors		5,104	
Turnout		3,207	62.83
Rejected ballots		2	0.06
Lib Dem Focus Team hold			
Lib Dem Focus Team hold			
Lib Dem Focus Team hold			

=== Chessington North ===
Chessington North (2)
Party	Candidate	Votes	%
Lib Dem Focus Team	Ian F. Osborne*	1,460	64.42
Lib Dem Focus Team	Brian M. Bennett*	1,439	
Conservative	Emmanuel J.G. Brooker	478	20.30
Conservative	Fiona H. Townley	435	
Labour	Geraldene E. Dawson	365	15.28
Labour	Matthew J, Foulsham	323	
Registered electors		3,789	
Turnout		2,364	62.39
Rejected ballots		2	0.08
Lib Dem Focus Team hold			
Lib Dem Focus Team hold			

=== Chessington South ===
Chessington South (3)
Party	Candidate	Votes	%
Lib Dem Focus Team	Susan Goodship	1,463	38.73
Lib Dem Focus Team	Jeffrey P. Hanna	1,399	
Lib Dem Focus Team	Mary Watts	1,353	
Conservative	Herbert M.V. Barker	1,251	32.19
Conservative	Colin A.T. Suckling	1,131	
Conservative	Paul J. Johnston	1,123	
Labour	Christopher J. Duggan	1,117	29.08
Labour	David Preece	1,038	
Labour	Adrian P. Haren	1,010	
Registered electors		6,627	
Turnout		3,889	58.68
Rejected ballots		6	0.15
Lib Dem Focus Team gain from Conservative			
Lib Dem Focus Team gain from Conservative			
Lib Dem Focus Team gain from Conservative			

=== Coombe ===
Coombe (2)
Party	Candidate	Votes	%
Conservative	Kenneth R. Wootton*	999	63.94
Conservative	Marjorie Hartfree*	986	
Labour	Catherine E.L. Pestano	295	18.67
Liberal Democrats	John M. Wadleton	295	17.39
Labour	Trevor E. Webb	284	
Liberal Democrats	Iris R.J. Grender	244	
Registered electors		3,023	
Turnout		1,658	54.85
Rejected ballots		0	0.00
Conservative hold			
Conservative hold			

=== Grove ===
Grove (3)
Party	Candidate	Votes	%
Lib Dem Focus Team	Christine S. Hitchcock	1,523	47.15
Lib Dem Focus Team	Christopher A. Nicholson*	1,426	
Lib Dem Focus Team	Katherine J. Stones	1,348	
Conservative	Francis P. McHugh	824	26.90
Conservative	Rupert StJ. Stephens	821	
Conservative	Terence W. Bowers	806	
Labour	David K.J. Cooper	553	17.75
Labour	Leo B. Brightley	536	
Labour	Shona C. Godkin	529	
Green	Michael J. Seviour	249	8.20
Registered electors		5,483	
Turnout		3,006	54.82
Rejected ballots		5	0.17
Lib Dem Focus Team hold			
Lib Dem Focus Team hold			
Lib Dem Focus Team hold			

=== Hill ===
Hill (2)
Party	Candidate	Votes	%
Conservative	David M. Edwards	1,059	54.95
Conservative	Trevor F. Thorpe	1,037	
Labour	Julia A. Rees	423	21.03
Labour	Roger J. Price	378	
Lib Dem Focus Team	Ian M. Cridland	276	14.00
Lib Dem Focus Team	Alan R. Pemberton	258	
Green	Margaret Torr	191	10.02
Registered electors		3,690	
Turnout		1,884	51.06
Rejected ballots		3	0.16
Conservative hold			
Conservative hold			

=== Hook ===
Hook (2)
Party	Candidate	Votes	%
Lib Dem Focus Team	David Campanale*	1,235	53.86
Lib Dem Focus Team	Ian A. Reid	1,149	
Conservative	Timothy D. Brown	669	29.19
Conservative	Edith L.E. Millidge	622	
Labour	David A. Denham	306	13.33
Labour	Sean T. McLoughlin	283	
Green	Laurence A. Thompson	80	3.62
Registered electors		3,670	
Turnout		2,273	61.93
Rejected ballots		2	0.09
Lib Dem Focus Team hold			
Lib Dem Focus Team hold			

=== Malden Manor ===
Malden Manor (2)
Party	Candidate	Votes	%
Conservative	Adrian J. Clare*	1,120	60.67
Conservative	John S. Godden	1,052	
Labour	Warren M. Kloman	429	23.41
Labour	Margaret J. Rainger	408	
Liberal Democrats	Christopher M. Bryan	300	15.92
Liberal Democrats	Jonathan P.K. Lawlor	269	
Registered electors		3,736	
Turnout		1,971	52.76
Rejected ballots		79	4.01
Conservative hold			
Conservative hold			

=== Norbiton ===
Norbiton (3)
Party	Candidate	Votes	%
Labour	Steven Mama	1,677	58.68
Labour	George A. Forsyth	1,587	
Labour	Julie A. Reay	1,575	
Conservative	Anne C. Horsfield	548	18.95
Conservative	Audrey D. Parry	517	
Conservative	Mark S. Parry	497	
Liberal Democrats	Peter E.B. Harris	364	11.89
Liberal Democrats	Antonia M. Harrison Crook	310	
Liberal Democrats	Robert S. Griffiths	306	
Green	Jean Vidler	288	10.48
Registered electors		5,294	
Turnout		2,869	54.19
Rejected ballots		1	0.04
Labour hold			
Labour gain from Lib Dem Focus Team			
Labour hold			

=== Norbiton Park ===
Norbiton Park (2)
Party	Candidate	Votes	%
Conservative	Jeffrey A. Reardon	1,261	57.12
Conservative	Frank Hartfree*	1,225	
Liberal Democrats	Susan E. Baxter	506	22.61
Liberal Democrats	Stephen J. Porter	477	
Labour	Gerald A. Jones	466	20.27
Labour	Sally Richardson	415	
Registered electors		4,133	
Turnout		2,317	56.06
Rejected ballots		2	0.09
Conservative hold			
Conservative hold			

=== St James ===
St James (3)
Party	Candidate	Votes	%
Conservative	David Fraser*	1,735	60.53
Conservative	Peter S. Bridger	1,675	
Conservative	Gavin N. French*	1,599	
Labour	Susanne K. Burridge	721	24.28
Labour	David G. Rainger	679	
Labour	Brian A.W. Shemmings	610	
Liberal Democrats	Jennifer A. Catchpole	429	15.19
Liberal Democrats	Carol M. Orton	418	
Liberal Democrats	Olly M. Grender	410	
Registered electors		5,153	
Turnout		2,938	57.02
Rejected ballots		4	0.14
Conservative hold			
Conservative gain from Lib Dem Focus Team			
Conservative hold			

=== St Marks ===
St Marks (3)
Party	Candidate	Votes	%
Conservative	Rupert O. Matthews	1,287	44.60
Conservative	David V. Smedley*	1,282	
Conservative	Dennis F. Doe*	1,262	
Labour	Sadie Cheston	653	22.01
Labour	Arthur G. Cheston	625	
Labour	Mark D.G. Heather	612	
Liberal Democrats	Anthony J. Abbott	563	18.55
Liberal Democrats	Leon Grabman	523	
Liberal Democrats	Robert M. Steed	508	
Green	Martin Lake	425	14.84
Registered electors		5,708	
Turnout		2,785	48.79
Rejected ballots		4	0.14
Conservative hold			
Conservative hold			
Conservative hold			

=== Surbiton Hill ===
Surbiton Hill (3)
Party	Candidate	Votes	%
Conservative	Justin N. Bradford	1,270	47.71
Conservative	Jane O. Smith*	1,257	
Conservative	Quentin R. Edgington	1,227	
Labour	Brian A. Bonsey	680	24.83
Labour	Jeremy J. Thorn	659	
Labour	Neil Willoughby	615	
Liberal Democrats	Myra R.L. Abbott	437	15.75
Liberal Democrats	Judith A. Manwell	409	
Liberal Democrats	David M. Horwill	393	
Green	Brian J. Holmes	307	11.71
Registered electors		5,756	
Turnout		2,637	45.81
Rejected ballots		1	0.04
Conservative hold			
Conservative hold			
Conservative hold			

=== Tolworth East ===
Tolworth East (2)
Party	Candidate	Votes	%
Conservative	Leslie G.P. Dale	920	43.22
Conservative	Christopher B. Hunt	909	
Liberal Democrats	Philip J. Carr	907	42.84
Liberal Democrats	Victoria C.M. Harris	907	
Labour	Lionel R. Hockley	307	13.94
Labour	Laurence G. Simmonds	282	
Registered electors		3,888	
Turnout		2,228	57.30
Rejected ballots		1	0.03
Conservative gain from Lib Dem Focus Team			
Conservative gain from Lib Dem Focus Team			

=== Tolworth South ===
Tolworth South (2)
Party	Candidate	Votes	%
Labour	Toby Flux	1,103	50.09
Labour	Paul S. Wright	1,024	
Conservative	Patricia S. Gardham	834	38.80
Conservative	Michael J.F. Mannall*	814	
Lib Dem Focus Team	Christine J. Leach	241	11.11
Lib Dem Focus Team	John B. Walker	231	
Registered electors		3,828	
Turnout		2,246	58.67
Rejected ballots		4	0.18
Labour gain from Conservative			
Labour gain from Conservative			

=== Tolworth West ===
Tolworth West (2)
Party	Candidate	Votes	%
Labour	Robin T. Hutchinson*	1,177	54.82
Labour	Loraine Monk	1,106	
Conservative	Philip E. Whiting	728	33.37
Conservative	Rosham Sadri	662	
Lib Dem Focus Team	Louise A. Bloom	255	11.81
Lib Dem Focus Team	Paul J. Jackson	236	
Registered electors		3,903	
Turnout		2,203	56.44
Rejected ballots		2	0.09
Labour hold			
Labour hold			

=== Tudor ===
Tudor (3)
Party	Candidate	Votes	%
Conservative	David H. Cunningham	1,838	48.82
Conservative	Andrew L. Lee	1,803	
Conservative	Lynne M.M. Dunn	1,763	
Lib Dem Focus Team	Charles N. Bloom*	924	22.96
Lib Dem Focus Team	Jane E. Ware	838	
Lib Dem Focus Team	Peter J.W. Grender	778	
Labour	Marion Richardson	695	18.38
Labour	Rosemary M. Wagner	676	
Labour	James R. Smy	664	
Green	Jane E. Taylor	363	9.84
Registered electors		6,029	
Turnout		3,623	60.09
Rejected ballots		3	0.08
Conservative gain from Lib Dem Focus Team			
Conservative gain from Lib Dem Focus Team			
Conservative gain from Lib Dem Focus Team			
