= 2006 Kingston upon Thames London Borough Council election =

2006 local election in England

← 2002	4 May 2006	2010 →

All 48 seats to Kingston upon Thames London Borough Council 25 seats needed for a majority
	First party	Second party	Third party
Party	Liberal Democrats	Conservative	Labour
Seats won	25	21	2
Seat change	▼5	▲6	▼1
Popular vote	18,875	19,992	4,822
Percentage	38.5%	40.8%	9.8%
Swing	▼8.9%	▲5.8%	▼1.9%
- Map of the results of the 2006 Kingston upon Thames council election. Conservatives in blue, Labour in red and Liberal Democrats in yellow.
Council control before election
Liberal Democrats
Council control after election
Liberal Democrats

Elections to Kingston upon Thames London Borough Council were held on 4 May 2006. The whole council was up for election and the Liberal Democrats held overall control, the first time any political party has retained control of the council since 1982.

== Election result ==
Kingston upon Thames local election result 2006
Party	Seats	Gains	Losses	Net gain/loss	Seats %	Votes %	Votes	+/−
Liberal Democrats	25	4	9	▼5	52.0	38.5	18,875	▼8.9
Conservative	21	9	3	▲6	43.8	40.8	19,992	▲5.8
Labour	2	0	1	▼1	4.2	9.8	4,822	▼1.9
Green	0	0	0	0	0.0	8.2	3,994	▲5.3
CPA	0	0	0	0	0.0	2.3	1,114	▼0.7
Socialist Labour	0	0	0	0	0.0	0.2	95	New
Socialist	0	0	0	0	0.0	0.2	80	New

== Ward results ==
=== Alexandra ===
Alexandra (3)
Party	Candidate	Votes	%	±%
Conservative	Richard Hudson	1,453	45.4	+5.0
Liberal Democrats	David Berry*	1,446	45.2	−6.6
Conservative	Ian George	1,413	44.2	+3.8
Conservative	Andrea Knowles	1,404	43.9	+4.3
Liberal Democrats	Patricia Franks*	1,376	43.0	−4.8
Liberal Democrats	Wydeeswaran Thayalan	1,331	41.6	−5.6
Labour	Bill Bennett	208	6.5	−1.0
Labour	Lawrence Green	205	6.4	−1.1
Labour	Geoff Parnell	172	5.4	−0.1
Turnout		3,211	51.0	+8.2
Conservative gain from Liberal Democrats		Swing		
Liberal Democrats hold		Swing		
Conservative gain from Liberal Democrats		Swing		

=== Berrylands ===
Berrylands (3)
Party	Candidate	Votes	%	±%
Liberal Democrats	Frances Moseley	1,555	47.1	+11.3
Liberal Democrats	Robert Steed	1,456	44.1	+8.4
Liberal Democrats	Rohan Yoganathan	1,400	42.4	+7.9
Conservative	Kevin Davis*	1,394	42.2	−7.1
Conservative	David Booth*	1,347	40.8	−2.8
Conservative	Robert Sartor	1,337	40.5	−3.2
Green	William Dawbarn	329	10.0	N/A
Labour	Tom Cashman	194	5.9	−7.4
Labour	John Lee	172	5.2	−7.9
Labour	Sheilla Bhatti	152	4.6	−7.3
CPA	Sarah Daniell	97	2.9	−1.6
Turnout		3,311	51.5	+13.6
Liberal Democrats gain from Conservative		Swing		
Liberal Democrats gain from Conservative		Swing		
Liberal Democrats gain from Conservative		Swing		

=== Beverley ===
Beverley (3)
Party	Candidate	Votes	%	±%
Liberal Democrats	Donald Jordan*	1,398	46.8	−8.3
Liberal Democrats	Simon James*	1,391	46.5	−7.8
Liberal Democrats	Derek Osbourne*	1,385	46.3	−9.5
Conservative	Mike Head	972	32.5	+0.6
Conservative	Rosemary Salusbury	936	31.3	−0.4
Conservative	John Tuthill	874	29.2	−0.8
Green	Christopher Walker	416	13.9	N/A
Labour	Max Freedman	284	9.5	+1.5
Labour	Marian Darke	275	9.2	+1.8
Labour	Duncan Braithwaite	268	9.0	+0.6
CPA	Douglas Gibbons	125	4.2	+0.3
CPA	Diana Glencross	93	3.1	N/A
CPA	Esther Stewart	80	2.7	N/A
Turnout		2,999	48.4	+1.5
Liberal Democrats hold		Swing		
Liberal Democrats hold		Swing		
Liberal Democrats hold		Swing		

=== Canbury ===
Canbury (3)
Party	Candidate	Votes	%	±%
Conservative	Geoffrey Austin	1,305	40.4	+14.8
Liberal Democrats	David Ryder-Mills	1,290	39.9	−3.7
Conservative	David Glasscock	1,254	38.8	+14.3
Conservative	Romana Chohan	1,225	37.9	+13.6
Liberal Democrats	Lally Malik	1,199	37.1	−4.3
Liberal Democrats	Trevor Heap	1,143	35.4	−3.8
Green	Carol Vagg	543	16.8	+8.0
Labour	Norma Brewer	403	12.5	−11.1
Labour	Richard Hyde	358	11.1	−11.0
Labour	Christopher Priest	347	10.7	−11.1
Socialist	Oliver Bond	80	2.5	N/A
Turnout		3,241	43.8	+0.5
Conservative gain from Liberal Democrats		Swing		
Liberal Democrats hold		Swing		
Conservative gain from Liberal Democrats		Swing		

=== Chessington North and Hook ===
Chessington North and Hook (3)
Party	Candidate	Votes	%	±%
Liberal Democrats	Ian Reid*	1,156	45.3	−24.8
Liberal Democrats	Sue Baker*	1,143	44.8	−23.9
Liberal Democrats	Mary Reid*	1,141	44.7	−24.4
Conservative	Andrew Day	1,123	44.0	+22.9
Conservative	Irene Suckling	992	38.9	+18.9
Conservative	Nithyalakshmy Kumpeson	963	37.8	+17.9
Labour	Judith Cowley	217	8.5	+1.6
Labour	Steve Kearney	200	7.8	+1.4
Labour	Tony Cottrell	191	7.5	+1.7
Turnout		2,570	42.9	+2.8
Liberal Democrats hold		Swing		
Liberal Democrats hold		Swing		
Liberal Democrats hold		Swing		

=== Chessington South ===
Chessington South (3)
Party	Candidate	Votes	%	±%
Liberal Democrats	Patricia Bamford*	1,272	50.5	−8.3
Liberal Democrats	Shiraz Mirza*	1,216	48.2	−4.3
Liberal Democrats	Kevin O'Connor	1,170	46.4	−9.7
Conservative	Daniel Goodger	916	36.3	+7.3
Conservative	Amanda Birch	898	35.6	+7.1
Conservative	Malcolm Johnson	800	31.7	+3.4
Labour	Pauline Kearney	277	11.0	+3.8
Labour	Jeffrey Hanna	263	10.4	+3.1
Labour	Shaun McLoughlin	241	9.6	+2.7
Socialist Labour	John Hayball	95	3.8	N/A
CPA	Anthony May	95	3.8	+1.7
CPA	Susan May	79	3.1	+1.4
Turnout		3,208	46.6	+7.4
Liberal Democrats hold		Swing		
Liberal Democrats hold		Swing		
Liberal Democrats hold		Swing		

=== Coombe Hill ===
Coombe Hill (3)
Party	Candidate	Votes	%	±%
Conservative	Robin Codd*	1,726	69.0	+2.6
Conservative	David Edwards*	1,663	66.5	+2.0
Conservative	Eric Humphrey*	1,599	63.9	+0.5
Liberal Democrats	Peter Grender	434	17.3	−1.8
Liberal Democrats	Jonathan Oates	405	16.2	−2.7
Liberal Democrats	Vijay Solanki	343	13.7	−4.5
Green	James Humphreys	251	10.0	+3.9
Labour	Roger Price	231	9.2	+1.6
Labour	Wendy Malseed	216	8.6	+0.6
Labour	Daljit Sehbai	181	7.2	+0.5
CPA	Lydia Fowler	83	3.3	N/A
Turnout		2,502	38.0	+6.8
Conservative hold		Swing		
Conservative hold		Swing		
Conservative hold		Swing		

=== Coombe Vale ===
Coombe Vale (3)
Party	Candidate	Votes	%	±%
Conservative	Adrian Holder	1,624	51.4	+10.5
Conservative	James White	1,596	50.5	+9.6
Conservative	Robert-John Tasker	1,550	49.1	+9.4
Liberal Democrats	Julie Haines*	1,028	32.5	−9.5
Liberal Democrats	Celia Osbourne	922	29.2	−12.7
Liberal Democrats	Leslie Jones	832	26.3	−12.8
Green	Nighat Taimuri	291	9.2	+5.5
Labour	Daniel Haynes	276	8.7	+2.0
Labour	Nora Pearce	239	7.6	+1.2
Labour	Helen Williams	237	7.5	+3.0
CPA	Peter Flower	222	7.0	−0.5
CPA	David Campanale	152	4.8	−2.5
CPA	Paul Jacobs	107	3.4	−3.3
Turnout		3,165	51.2	+3.2
Conservative gain from Liberal Democrats		Swing		
Conservative gain from Liberal Democrats		Swing		
Conservative hold		Swing		

=== Grove ===
Grove (3)
Party	Candidate	Votes	%	±%
Liberal Democrats	Christine Hitchcock*	1,186	47.8	−10.9
Liberal Democrats	Rachel O'Connor	1,059	42.7	−15.8
Liberal Democrats	Bart Ricketts*	1,000	40.3	−13.0
Conservative	Terence Bowers	881	35.5	+7.5
Conservative	David Salisbury	814	32.8	+5.4
Conservative	Michael Mentz	782	31.5	+5.3
Green	Terry James	452	18.2	+11.5
Labour	Amanda Fitzgerald	231	9.3	+2.8
Labour	Margaret Oldroyd	205	8.3	+2.8
Labour	Laurie South	203	8.2	+2.2
Turnout		2,491	38.5	+2.5
Liberal Democrats hold		Swing		
Liberal Democrats hold		Swing		
Liberal Democrats hold		Swing		

=== Norbiton ===
Norbiton (3)
Party	Candidate	Votes	%	±%
Labour	Steven Mama*	971	39.0	−3.6
Labour	Sheila Griffin*	944	37.9	+0.4
Liberal Democrats	Penelope Shelton	925	37.1	+4.8
Labour	Nick Parrott	914	36.7	−2.8
Liberal Democrats	Rosemary Tilley	805	32.3	+2.7
Liberal Democrats	David Bamford	788	31.6	+2.1
Conservative	Leslie Blake	463	18.6	+1.0
Conservative	Jane Cox	410	16.5	+0.2
Conservative	Gavin French	401	16.1	−2.4
Green	Martin Hall	316	12.7	+5.7
Turnout		2,494	43.5	+7.4
Labour hold		Swing		
Labour hold		Swing		
Liberal Democrats gain from Labour		Swing		

=== Old Malden ===
Old Malden (3)
Party	Candidate	Votes	%	±%
Conservative	David Fraser	1,555	47.0	+13.7
Conservative	Michael Amson	1,480	44.8	+10.0
Liberal Democrats	Ian McDonald*	1,471	44.5	−14.5
Conservative	Geoffrey Clements	1,464	44.3	+24.2
Liberal Democrats	Ghazala Hayat*	1,395	42.2	−11.1
Liberal Democrats	Mary Watts	1,272	38.5	−17.5
Labour	Robert Kellett	241	7.3	+1.8
Labour	George Pearson	223	6.7	+1.2
Labour	Francis White	191	5.8	+0.6
CPA	Roger Glencross	134	4.1	+0.7
Turnout		3,322	50.6	+7.5
Conservative gain from Liberal Democrats		Swing		
Conservative gain from Liberal Democrats		Swing		
Liberal Democrats hold		Swing		

=== St James ===
St James (3)
Party	Candidate	Votes	%	±%
Conservative	Mary Clark	1,689	59.1	+11.4
Conservative	Howard Jones*	1,603	56.1	+11.3
Conservative	Kenneth Smith	1,580	55.3	+15.0
Liberal Democrats	Iris Grender	773	27.0	−14.2
Liberal Democrats	Robert Eyre-Brook	732	25.6	−12.7
Liberal Democrats	Dennis Goodship	704	24.6	−14.4
Labour	Iris Clifford	316	11.1	+0.6
Labour	Gerry Jones	301	10.5	+3.4
Labour	John Knowles	258	9.0	+1.1
CPA	Eleanor Glencross	103	3.6	−1.6
CPA	Philippa Glencross	83	2.9	N/A
Turnout		2,875	47.3	+9.5
Conservative hold		Swing		
Conservative hold		Swing		
Conservative gain from Liberal Democrats		Swing		

=== St Mark's ===
St Mark's (3)
Party	Candidate	Votes	%	±%
Liberal Democrats	Elizabeth Shard*	1,448	53.4	−17.5
Liberal Democrats	Barry O'Mahony*	1,403	51.7	−18.4
Liberal Democrats	Mylvaganam Yoganathan*	1,389	51.2	−17.2
Conservative	Michael Burden	879	32.4	+10.4
Conservative	David Hutchinson	864	31.8	+10.6
Conservative	James Pirret	844	31.1	+9.9
Green	Wayne George	388	14.3	N/A
Labour	Sandra Coombs	170	6.3	+1.0
Labour	Katie Hill	163	6.0	+1.1
Labour	Niranjan Jayasundera	117	4.3	−0.4
CPA	Mark Newell	57	2.1	−0.3
Turnout		2,720	37.3	+1.8
Liberal Democrats hold		Swing		
Liberal Democrats hold		Swing		
Liberal Democrats hold		Swing		

=== Surbiton Hill ===
Surbiton Hill (3)
Party	Candidate	Votes	%	±%
Conservative	Nicholas Kilby	1,578	51.6	+7.7
Conservative	Janet Bowen-Hitchings*	1,570	51.3	+6.4
Conservative	Paul Johnston*	1,511	49.4	+6.3
Liberal Democrats	Adam Melville	959	31.4	−8.9
Liberal Democrats	Helen Thorne	900	29.4	+9.1
Liberal Democrats	Umesh Parekh	790	25.8	−11.5
Green	David Barnsdale	444	14.5	N/A
Labour	David Cooper	286	9.3	−3.8
Labour	Michael Cowley	245	8.0	−4.0
Labour	Rosemary Vase	243	7.9	−3.7
CPA	Kenneth Scrimshaw	97	3.2	−0.5
Turnout		3,063	44.2	+9.7
Conservative hold		Swing		
Conservative hold		Swing		
Conservative hold		Swing		

=== Tolworth and Hook Rise ===
Tolworth and Hook Rise (3)
Party	Candidate	Votes	%	±%
Liberal Democrats	Rolson Davies*	1,724	63.1	+4.0
Liberal Democrats	Vicki Harris*	1,619	59.2	+3.2
Liberal Democrats	Robert Lee*	1,563	57.2	+3.1
Conservative	Susan Hudson	690	25.2	+6.7
Conservative	Mavis Cracknell	682	25.0	+6.6
Conservative	Maureen Hutchinson	647	23.7	+5.3
Labour	Anna Ring	215	7.9	−10.8
Labour	Gabriel Abulafia	214	7.8	−10.6
Labour	Peter Walker	193	7.1	−11.1
CPA	Doreen Scrimshaw	101	3.7	+0.9
Turnout		2,749	42.6	+0.4
Liberal Democrats hold		Swing		
Liberal Democrats hold		Swing		
Liberal Democrats hold		Swing		

=== Tudor ===
Tudor (3)
Party	Candidate	Votes	%	±%
Conservative	David Cunningham*	1,744	58.0	+0.2
Conservative	Dennis Doe*	1,609	53.5	−1.2
Conservative	Frank Thompson*	1,569	52.1	−0.8
Liberal Democrats	Fran Coyne	810	26.9	+3.0
Liberal Democrats	Richard Lillicrap	722	24.0	−0.9
Liberal Democrats	Susan Goodship	669	22.2	+0.9
Green	Helen Pitchforth	564	18.7	+9.2
Labour	Michael Butcher	302	10.0	−1.2
Labour	Brian Morris	250	8.3	−3.2
Labour	Warren Kloman	183	6.1	−4.5
Turnout		3,014	47.7	+7.8
Conservative hold		Swing		
Conservative hold		Swing		
Conservative hold		Swing		
