= 1998 Kingston upon Thames London Borough Council election =

1998 local election in England

- 7 May 1998

All 50 seats up for election to Kingston upon Thames London Borough Council 26 seats needed for a majority
- Registered: 101,605
- Turnout: 42,168, 41.50% (▼11.83)

| | First party | Second party | Third party |
|---|---|---|---|
| Party | Conservative | Liberal Democrats | Labour |
| Last election | 18 seats, 33.60% | 26 seats, 43.14% | 6 seats, 21.63% |
| Seats before | 17 | 26 (Note: Just before the election there was one seat that previously belonged to the Liberal Democrats that was made vacant without enough time for a separate by-election) | 6 |
| Seats won | 21 | 19 | 10 |
| Seat change | ▲4 | ▼8 | ▲4 |
| Popular vote | 38,810 | 36,369 | 26,872 |
| Percentage | 37.56% | 35.19% | 26.00% |
| Swing | ▲3.96 | ▼7.95 | ▲4.37 |
Council control before election
Liberal Democrats
Council control after election
No Overall Control

The 1998 Kingston upon Thames Council election was held on 7 May 1998. The whole council was up for election and the Liberal Democrats lost overall control of the council to a Conservative led minority administration.

== Election result ==
1998 Kingston Upon Thames London Borough Council elections
| Party | Seats | Gains | Losses | Net gain/loss | Seats % | Votes % | Votes | +/− |
|---|---|---|---|---|---|---|---|---|
| Conservative | 21 | 5 | 1 | ▲4 | 42.00 | 37.56 | 38,810 | ▲3.96 |
| Liberal Democrats | 19 | 2 | 9 | ▼7 | 38.00 | 35.19 | 36,369 | ▼7.95 |
| Labour | 10 | 4 | 0 | ▲4 | 20.00 | 26.00 | 26,872 | ▲4.37 |
| Green | 0 | 0 | 0 | Steady | 0.00 | 0.87 | 899 | ▼0.76 |
| Poplar | 0 | 0 | 0 | Steady | 0.00 | 0.31 | 323 | New |
| Socialist Labour | 0 | 0 | 0 | Steady | 0.00 | 0.06 | 63 | New |
| Total | 50 | | | | | | | |

↓
| 19 | 10 | 21 |
| Liberal Democrats | Labour | Conservative |

== Ward results ==
(*) - Indicates an incumbent candidate

(†) - Indicates an incumbent candidate standing in a different ward

=== Berrylands ===
Berrylands (3)
| Party | Candidate | Votes | % | ±% |
|---|---|---|---|---|
| Conservative | Timothy Brown | 1,528 | 55.47 | ▲9.39 |
| Conservative | Leslie Dale | 1,519 | | |
| Conservative | Kevin Davis | 1,456 | | |
| Liberal Democrats | Anthony Davis | 596 | 19.19 | ▼10.17 |
| Labour | Joanne Agnew | 560 | 19.43 | ▲5.63 |
| Labour | Joan Bulley | 532 | | |
| Labour | Amanda Thirsk | 485 | | |
| Liberal Democrats | Ashley Stanbrook | 484 | | |
| Liberal Democrats | Robert Eyre-Brook | 478 | | |
| Green | David Stimson | 160 | 5.91 | ▼4.84 |
| Registered electors | | 6,468 | | ▲369 |
| Turnout | | 2,747 | 42.47 | ▼7.96 |
| Rejected ballots | | 12 | 0.44 | ▲0.15 |
| Conservative hold | | | | |
| Conservative hold | | | | |
| Conservative hold | | | | |

=== Burlington ===
Burlington (2)
| Party | Candidate | Votes | % | ±% |
|---|---|---|---|---|
| Liberal Democrats | Derek Osbourne* | 942 | 51.87 | ▼2.02 |
| Liberal Democrats | Adrian McLeay* | 912 | | |
| Conservative | John Godden^{†} (Note: Godden was a sitting councillor representing the Malden Manor ward) | 500 | 27.48 | ▼2.83 |
| Conservative | Adam Bradford | 482 | | |
| Labour | Joseph Freedman | 395 | 20.65 | ▲4.85 |
| Labour | Sharon Waugh | 343 | | |
| Registered electors | | 4,014 | | ▲34 |
| Turnout | | 1,873 | 46.66 | ▼12.41 |
| Rejected ballots | | 8 | 0.43 | ▲0.30 |
| Liberal Democrats hold | | | | |
| Liberal Democrats hold | | | | |

=== Cambridge ===
Cambridge (3)
| Party | Candidate | Votes | % | ±% |
|---|---|---|---|---|
| Liberal Democrats | Julie Haines* | 1,063 | 44.44 | ▼16.64 |
| Liberal Democrats | Ian Manders* | 1,014 | | |
| Liberal Democrats | John Heamon* | 996 | | |
| Conservative | Jeffrey Reardon | 927 | 39.06 | ▲7.02 |
| Conservative | Charles Cox | 918 | | |
| Conservative | Charles Krieg | 856 | | |
| Labour | Sally Richardson | 384 | 16.50 | ▲6.43 |
| Labour | Marion Richardson | 379 | | |
| Labour | Molly Kelly | 378 | | |
| Registered electors | | 5,835 | | ▲274 |
| Turnout | | 2,439 | 41.80 | ▼16.18 |
| Rejected ballots | | 9 | 0.37 | ▲0.18 |
| Liberal Democrats hold | | | | |
| Liberal Democrats hold | | | | |
| Liberal Democrats hold | | | | |

=== Canbury ===
Canbury (3)
| Party | Candidate | Votes | % | ±% |
|---|---|---|---|---|
| Labour | Wendy Malseed | 1,017 | 39.09 | ▲11.85 |
| Labour | John Ellin | 1,011 | | |
| Labour | Christopher Priest | 962 | | |
| Liberal Democrats | Richard Lillicrap* | 948 | 36.26 | ▼15.18 |
| Liberal Democrats | John Tilley* | 935 | | |
| Liberal Democrats | Dan Falchikov | 891 | | |
| Conservative | Jonathan Cooper | 516 | 20.43 | ▲4.85 |
| Conservative | Quentin Edgington^{†} (Note: Edgington was a sitting councillor representing the Tudor ward) | 479 | | |
| Conservative | Shaun Friend | 468 | | |
| Poplar | Jeremy Middleton | 121 | 4.22 | New |
| Poplar | Jean Vidler | 111 | | |
| Poplar | Nicholas Yelland | 91 | | |
| Registered electors | | 5,467 | | ▲265 |
| Turnout | | 2,637 | 48.23 | ▼9.82 |
| Rejected ballots | | 8 | 0.30 | ▲0.20 |
| Labour gain from Liberal Democrats | | | | |
| Labour gain from Liberal Democrats | | | | |
| Labour gain from Liberal Democrats | | | | |

=== Chessington North ===
Chessington North (2)
| Party | Candidate | Votes | % | ±% |
|---|---|---|---|---|
| Liberal Democrats | Vicki Harris* | 899 | 65.61 | ▼10.96 |
| Liberal Democrats | Brian Bennett* | 881 | | |
| Conservative | Marion Evans | 287 | 20.68 | ▲6.82 |
| Conservative | David Salusbury | 274 | | |
| Labour | Pauline Kearney | 192 | 13.71 | ▲4.14 |
| Labour | John Woodman | 180 | | |
| Registered electors | | 3,680 | | ▼116 |
| Turnout | | 1,426 | 38.75 | ▼14.86 |
| Rejected ballots | | 2 | 0.14 | ▲0.04 |
| Liberal Democrats hold | | | | |
| Liberal Democrats hold | | | | |

=== Chessington South ===
Chessington South (3)
| Party | Candidate | Votes | % | ±% |
|---|---|---|---|---|
| Liberal Democrats | Sally Scrivens* | 1,137 | 38.48 | ▼7.24 |
| Liberal Democrats | Patricia Bamford | 1,097 | | |
| Liberal Democrats | Shiraz Mirza | 1,069 | | |
| Labour | Jeffrey Hanna | 888 | 30.32 | ▲9.61 |
| Labour | Michael Cowley | 870 | | |
| Conservative | Celia Flynn | 868 | 30.01 | ▲3.40 |
| Conservative | Herbert Barker | 857 | | |
| Conservative | Ian Spiers | 851 | | |
| Labour | Andrea Macpherson | 844 | | |
| Socialist Labour | Mahesh Virk | 34 | 1.19 | New |
| Registered electors | | 7,052 | | ▲582 |
| Turnout | | 3,017 | 42.78 | ▼13.39 |
| Rejected ballots | | 7 | 0.23 | ▲0.12 |
| Liberal Democrats hold | | | | |
| Liberal Democrats hold | | | | |
| Liberal Democrats hold | | | | |

=== Coombe ===
Coombe (2)
| Party | Candidate | Votes | % | ±% |
|---|---|---|---|---|
| Conservative | Robin Codd* | 790 | 64.77 | ▲4.26 |
| Conservative | Peter Crerar | 714 | | |
| Liberal Democrats | Peter Grender | 223 | 18.60 | ▼3.17 |
| Labour | Noel Hamel | 211 | 16.62 | ▼1.10 |
| Liberal Democrats | David Knowles | 209 | | |
| Labour | Shaun McLoughlin | 175 | | |
| Registered electors | | 4,040 | | ▲618 |
| Turnout | | 1,248 | 30.89 | ▼17.47 |
| Rejected ballots | | 9 | 0.72 | ▲0.54 |
| Conservative hold | | | | |
| Conservative hold | | | | |

=== Grove ===
Grove (3)
| Party | Candidate | Votes | % | ±% |
|---|---|---|---|---|
| Liberal Democrats | Christine Hitchcock* | 889 | 38.72 | ▼15.16 |
| Liberal Democrats | Derrick Chester | 799 | | |
| Liberal Democrats | Roger Hayes | 743 | | |
| Conservative | Terence Bowers | 604 | 28.23 | ▲4.78 |
| Conservative | Anne Pitman | 596 | | |
| Conservative | Leon Grabman | 572 | | |
| Labour | Laurence South | 460 | 21.30 | ▲5.44 |
| Labour | Jane Fogg | 451 | | |
| Labour | Peter Roland | 426 | | |
| Green | Michael Stimson | 246 | 11.75 | ▲4.94 |
| Registered electors | | 6,450 | | ▲416 |
| Turnout | | 2,097 | 32.51 | ▼16.25 |
| Rejected ballots | | 14 | 0.67 | ▲0.23 |
| Liberal Democrats hold | | | | |
| Liberal Democrats hold | | | | |
| Liberal Democrats hold | | | | |

=== Hill ===
Hill (2)
| Party | Candidate | Votes | % | ±% |
|---|---|---|---|---|
| Conservative | David Edwards* | 829 | 60.00 | ▲8.99 |
| Conservative | Eric Humphrey* | 821 | | |
| Liberal Democrats | Susan Baxter | 295 | 20.15 | ▼4.23 |
| Labour | Roger Price | 282 | 19.85 | ▲1.34 |
| Labour | Geoffrey Malseed | 264 | | |
| Liberal Democrats | Paul Jackson | 259 | | |
| Registered electors | | 3,964 | | ▲102 |
| Turnout | | 1,442 | 36.38 | ▼10.88 |
| Rejected ballots | | 6 | 0.42 | ▲0.26 |
| Conservative hold | | | | |
| Conservative hold | | | | |

=== Hook ===
Hook (2)
| Party | Candidate | Votes | % | ±% |
|---|---|---|---|---|
| Liberal Democrats | Ian Reid* | 792 | 52.16 | ▼9.51 |
| Liberal Democrats | Katharine Reid* (Note: Reid was elected in a by-election triggered by the resignation of Mary Watts) | 766 | | |
| Conservative | Justin Bradford^{†} (Note: Bradford was a sitting councillor representing the Surbiton Hill ward) | 462 | 29.83 | ▼1.33 |
| Conservative | Elisabeth Ridge | 429 | | |
| Labour | Judith Cowley | 260 | 16.07 | ▲6.24 |
| Labour | Richard Wilson | 220 | | |
| Socialist Labour | John Hayball | 29 | 1.94 | New |
| Registered electors | | 3,794 | | ▼5 |
| Turnout | | 1,583 | 41.72 | ▼17.43 |
| Rejected ballots | | 4 | 0.25 | ▲0.21 |
| Liberal Democrats hold | | | | |
| Liberal Democrats hold | | | | |

=== Malden Manor ===
Malden Manor (2)
| Party | Candidate | Votes | % | ±% |
|---|---|---|---|---|
| Liberal Democrats | Ian McDonald* (Note: McDonald was elected in a by-election triggered by the resignation of Cllr Adrian Clare in 1995) | 831 | 45.39 | ▲21.07 |
| Liberal Democrats | Rolson Davies | 769 | | |
| Conservative | Leslie Daubeny | 751 | 42.27 | ▼6.26 |
| Conservative | Colin Schrader | 739 | | |
| Labour | Ian Michell | 232 | 12.34 | ▲14.80 |
| Labour | Warren Kloman | 203 | | |
| Registered electors | | 4,059 | | ▲101 |
| Turnout | | 1,833 | 45.16 | ▲4.38 |
| Rejected ballots | | 2 | 0.11 | ▼0.04 |
| Liberal Democrats gain from Conservative | | | | |
| Liberal Democrats hold | | | | |

=== Norbiton ===
Norbiton (3)
| Party | Candidate | Votes | % | ±% |
|---|---|---|---|---|
| Labour | Steven Mama* | 1,290 | 58.32 | ▲19.55 |
| Labour | Julie Reay* | 1,220 | | |
| Labour | Edgar Naylor | 1,201 | | |
| Liberal Democrats | Frances Coyne | 628 | 29.28 | ▼4.15 |
| Liberal Democrats | Paul Brill | 620 | | |
| Liberal Democrats | Liam Nolan | 615 | | |
| Conservative | Gavin French | 274 | 12.40 | ▲0.65 |
| Conservative | Fiona Kensell | 266 | | |
| Conservative | Peter Kensell | 249 | | |
| Registered electors | | 5,795 | | ▼314 |
| Turnout | | 2,368 | 40.86 | ▼11.87 |
| Rejected ballots | | 40 | 1.69 | ▲1.48 |
| Labour hold | | | | |
| Labour hold | | | | |
| Labour gain from Liberal Democrats | | | | |

=== Norbiton Park ===
Norbiton Park (2)
| Party | Candidate | Votes | % | ±% |
|---|---|---|---|---|
| Liberal Democrats | Wyn Evans* (Note: Evans was elected in a by-election triggered by the resignation of Cllr Jonathan Stratford in 1996) | 951 | 44.81 | ▼1.54 |
| Liberal Democrats | Donald Jordan | 833 | | |
| Conservative | Nicholas Heaton-Harris | 812 | 40.57 | Steady |
| Conservative | Gordon Johnson | 803 | | |
| Labour | Iris Clifford | 309 | 14.62 | ▲4.80 |
| Labour | Gerald Jones | 273 | | |
| Registered electors | | 4,302 | | ▲121 |
| Turnout | | 2,109 | 49.02 | ▼8.47 |
| Rejected ballots | | 8 | 0.38 | ▲0.26 |
| Liberal Democrats hold | | | | |
| Liberal Democrats hold | | | | |

=== St James ===
St James (3)
| Party | Candidate | Votes | % | ±% |
|---|---|---|---|---|
| Conservative | David Fraser* | 1,224 | 56.08 | ▲6.04 |
| Conservative | Michael Amson* | 1,104 | | |
| Conservative | Rajendra Pandya* | 988 | | |
| Liberal Democrats | Heather McDonald | 562 | 26.79 | ▼0.78 |
| Liberal Democrats | John Hamilton | 528 | | |
| Liberal Democrats | Peter Stotesbury | 494 | | |
| Labour | Francis White | 344 | 17.13 | ▲5.26 |
| Labour | Robert Kellet | 342 | | |
| Labour | Arambamoorthy Moorthy | 327 | | |
| Registered electors | | 5,164 | | Steady |
| Turnout | | 2,146 | 41.56 | ▼10.03 |
| Rejected ballots | | 14 | 0.65 | ▲0.39 |
| Conservative hold | | | | |
| Conservative hold | | | | |
| Conservative hold | | | | |

=== St Marks ===
St Marks (3)
| Party | Candidate | Votes | % | ±% |
|---|---|---|---|---|
| Conservative | Janice Jenner | 1,004 | 39.00 | ▲5.45 |
| Conservative | Rupert Matthews | 1,004 | | |
| Conservative | Dennis de Lord | 994 | | |
| Liberal Democrats | Gerry Goring* | 933 | 34.26 | ▼14.42 |
| Liberal Democrats | Mary Watts* | 859 | | |
| Liberal Democrats | Mylvaganam Yoganathan | 845 | | |
| Labour | Anthony Banks | 445 | 16.53 | ▲5.70 |
| Labour | Sandra Coombs | 433 | | |
| Labour | Toby Flux^{†} (Note: Flux was a sitting councillor representing the Tolworth South ward) | 394 | | |
| Green | David Barnsdale | 262 | 10.21 | ▲3.28 |
| Registered electors | | 7,061 | | ▲663 |
| Turnout | | 2,532 | 35.86 | ▲14.84 |
| Rejected ballots | | 7 | 0.28 | ▲0.10 |
| Conservative gain from Liberal Democrats | | | | |
| Conservative gain from Liberal Democrats | | | | |
| Conservative gain from Liberal Democrats | | | | |

=== Surbiton Hill ===
Surbiton Hill (3)
| Party | Candidate | Votes | % | ±% |
|---|---|---|---|---|
| Conservative | Janet Bowen-Hitchings | 1,010 | 41.42 | ▲0.40 |
| Conservative | Jane Smith* | 997 | | |
| Conservative | Paul Johnston | 975 | | |
| Labour | Ann Brown | 724 | 29.55 | ▼1.06 |
| Labour | Francis Baker | 719 | | |
| Liberal Democrats | Kenneth Evans | 718 | 29.03 | ▲6.33 |
| Liberal Democrats | Daniel Harris | 695 | | |
| Labour | Lawrence Green | 685 | | |
| Liberal Democrats | Adam Melville | 677 | | |
| Registered electors | | 5,657 | | ▼31 |
| Turnout | | 2,534 | 44.79 | ▼0.85 |
| Rejected ballots | | 7 | 0.28 | ▲0.20 |
| Conservative hold | | | | |
| Conservative hold | | | | |
| Conservative hold | | | | |

=== Tolworth East ===
Tolworth East (2)
| Party | Candidate | Votes | % | ±% |
|---|---|---|---|---|
| Conservative | David Booth | 716 | 43.74 | ▲4.52 |
| Conservative | Keith Witham | 674 | | |
| Liberal Democrats | David Ward* | 663 | 40.15 | ▼8.77 |
| Liberal Democrats | Edmond Rosenthal* | 613 | | |
| Labour | William Bennett | 267 | 16.11 | ▲4.25 |
| Labour | Janet Wing | 245 | | |
| Registered electors | | 4,129 | | ▲210 |
| Turnout | | 1,706 | 41.32 | ▼17.39 |
| Rejected ballots | | 6 | 0.35 | ▲0.22 |
| Conservative gain from Liberal Democrats | | | | |
| Conservative gain from Liberal Democrats | | | | |

=== Tolworth South ===
Tolworth South (2)
| Party | Candidate | Votes | % | ±% |
|---|---|---|---|---|
| Labour | Rory Faulkner | 644 | 48.41 | ▼2.66 |
| Labour | Andrew Hall | 601 | | |
| Conservative | Helen Padake | 436 | 33.20 | ▲12.13 |
| Conservative | Rupert Stephens | 418 | | |
| Liberal Democrats | Robert Griffiths | 243 | 18.39 | ▼4.71 |
| Liberal Democrats | Peter Burnard | 230 | | |
| Registered electors | | 3,745 | | ▼745 |
| Turnout | | 1,368 | 36.53 | ▼12.71 |
| Rejected ballots | | 5 | 0.37 | ▲0.06 |
| Labour hold | | | | |
| Labour hold | | | | |

=== Tolworth West ===
Tolworth West (2)
| Party | Candidate | Votes | % | ±% |
|---|---|---|---|---|
| Labour | Jeremy Thorn* | 783 | 40.82 | ▼1.11 |
| Labour | Marian Darke | 756 | | |
| Liberal Democrats | Sheila Cochrane | 715 | 35.92 | ▼2.61 |
| Liberal Democrats | Peter Simonsson | 639 | | |
| Conservative | Trevor Ribbins | 452 | 23.26 | ▲3.72 |
| Conservative | John Tuthill | 425 | | |
| Registered electors | | 4,200 | | ▲72 |
| Turnout | | 2,000 | 47.62 | ▼11.59 |
| Rejected ballots | | 3 | 0.15 | ▼0.05 |
| Labour hold | | | | |
| Labour hold | | | | |

=== Tudor ===
Tudor (3)
| Party | Candidate | Votes | % | ±% |
|---|---|---|---|---|
| Conservative | David Cunningham* | 1,355 | 42.11 | ▼2.43 |
| Conservative | Dennis Doe* | 1,270 | | |
| Conservative | Gwendoline Symonds | 1,267 | | |
| Liberal Democrats | Louise Bloom | 862 | 25.87 | ▼7.39 |
| Labour | Veronica Thane-Pickering | 803 | 24.52 | ▲2.32 |
| Liberal Democrats | Claire Jackson | 791 | | |
| Labour | Matthew Rees | 759 | | |
| Liberal Democrats | Ruper Nichol | 738 | | |
| Labour | Maire Thompson | 704 | | |
| Green | Brian Holmes | 231 | 7.50 | New |
| Registered electors | | 6,729 | | ▲754 |
| Turnout | | 3,063 | 45.52 | ▼9.74 |
| Rejected ballots | | 5 | 0.16 | ▲0.16 |
| Conservative hold | | | | |
| Conservative hold | | | | |
| Conservative hold | | | | |
