= Coombe (ward) =

- Former electoral ward for the Kingston upon Thames London Borough Council
- Coombe ward boundaries from 1978 to 2002
- Borough: Kingston upon Thames
- County: Greater London
- Electorate: 4,040 (1998)

Former electoral ward
- Created: 1965
- Abolished: 2002
- Councillors: 2

Coombe was an electoral ward in the Royal Borough of Kingston upon Thames from 1965 to 2002. The ward was first used in the 1964 elections and last used for the 1998 elections. It returned two councillors to Kingston upon Thames London Borough Council. For elections to the Greater London Council, the ward was part of the Kingston upon Thames electoral division from 1965 to 1986.

== 1978–2002 Kingston council elections ==
There was a revision of ward boundaries in Kingston upon Thames in 1978.

=== 1998 election ===
The election took place on 7 May 1998.

1998 Kingston upon Thames London Borough Council election: Coombe (2)
Party	Candidate	Votes	%	±%
Conservative	Robin Codd	790		
Conservative	Peter Crerar	714		
Liberal Democrats	Peter Grender	223		
Labour	Noel Hamel	211		
Liberal Democrats	David Knowles	209		
Labour	Shaun McLoughlin	175		
Turnout				
Conservative hold		Swing		
Conservative hold		Swing		

=== 1994 election ===
The election took place on 5 May 1994.

1994 Kingston upon Thames London Borough Council election: Coombe (2)
Party	Candidate	Votes	%	±%
Conservative	Kenneth Wootton	989	60.51	▼3.43
Conservative	Robin Codd	923		
Liberal Democrats	Paul Jackson	349	21.77	▼4.38
Liberal Democrats	Michael Moss	338		
Labour	David Cooper	286	17.72	▼0.95
Labour	Leo Brightley	274		
Registered electors		3,422		▲399
Turnout		1,655	48.36	▼6.49
Rejected ballots		3	0.18	▲0.18
Conservative hold				
Conservative hold				
