= 2018 Kingston upon Thames London Borough Council election =

2018 local election in England

2018 Kingston upon Thames Borough Council election
- 3 May 2018

All 48 seats to Kingston upon Thames Council 25 seats needed for a majority

	First party	Second party
Party	Liberal Democrats	Conservative
Last election	18 seats, 30.5%	28 seats, 39.1%
Seats won	39	9
Seat change	▲21	▼19
Popular vote	83,172	49,226
Percentage	51.7%	30.6%
Swing	▲21.2%	▼8.5%
- Results of the 2018 Kingston upon Thames council election. Liberal Democrats in yellow and Conservatives in blue.
Council control before election
Conservative
Council control after election
Liberal Democrats

The 2018 Kingston upon Thames Borough Council election took place on 3 May 2018 to elect members of Kingston upon Thames Council in London, England. This was on the same day as other local elections.

== Overall results ==
The Liberal Democrats gained control from the Conservatives. The Liberal Democrats won 39 seats (+21), the Conservatives won 9 seats (-19) and Labour lost its only seats in Norbiton (-2).

Kingston upon Thames London Borough Council election 2018
Party	Seats	Gains	Losses	Net gain/loss	Seats %	Votes %	Votes	+/−
Liberal Democrats	39	21	0	+21	81.3	51.7	83,172	+21.2
Conservative	9	0	19	-19	18.8	30.6	49,226	-8.5
Labour	0	0	2	-2	0.0	11.9	19,079	-5.6
Green	0	0	0	0	0.0	3.3	5,235	-3.5
KIRG	0	0	0	0	0.0	2.3	3,748	New
UKIP	0	0	0	0	0.0	0.2	267	-5.3
Independent	0	0	0	0	0.0	0.1	109	±0.0
Monster Raving Loony	0	0	0	0	0.0	0.1	82	New

== Results by ward ==
=== Alexandra ===
Alexandra
Party	Candidate	Votes	%	±%
Liberal Democrats	Mark Beynon	2,005	56.4	+25.7
Liberal Democrats	Sam Foulder-Hughes	1,992	56.0	+27.0
Liberal Democrats	Sharron Sumner	1,787	50.3	+22.7
Conservative	Richard Hudson*	1,217	34.2	−4.9
Conservative	Christopher Hayes*	1,117	31.4	−5.4
Conservative	Thomas Puddy	1,038	29.2	−9.4
Labour	Kris Srisaravanapavaan	423	11.9	−3.3
Labour	Stephen Kearney	346	9.7	−5.3
Labour	Robin Marsden	321	9.0	−4.6
Total votes				
Liberal Democrats gain from Conservative		Swing		
Liberal Democrats gain from Conservative		Swing		
Liberal Democrats gain from Conservative		Swing		

=== Berrylands ===
Berrylands
Party	Candidate	Votes	%	±%
Liberal Democrats	Sushila Abraham*	2,057	56.2	+17.8
Liberal Democrats	John Sweeney	2,030	55.4	+19.6
Liberal Democrats	Anita Schaper	2,005	54.8	+23.6
Conservative	Claire Harding	1,032	28.2	−8.9
Conservative	Michael Head*	1,014	27.7	−10.5
Conservative	Nicholas Rogers	946	25.8	−8.7
Labour	Sarah-Jane Brownlie	345	9.4	−3.4
Labour	Rob Brownlie	326	8.9	−3.8
Labour	Nannette Herbert	285	7.8	−2.5
KIRG	Oliver Eakin	210	5.7	N/A
Green	Kate Whitmarsh	180	4.9	−7.9
Green	Marley Robinson	168	4.6	N/A
Green	Pete Whitworth	96	2.6	N/A
Total votes				
Liberal Democrats hold		Swing		
Liberal Democrats gain from Conservative		Swing		
Liberal Democrats gain from Conservative		Swing		

=== Beverley ===
Beverley
Party	Candidate	Votes	%	±%
Liberal Democrats	Lesley Heap	1,986	50.4	+24.5
Liberal Democrats	Mark Durrant	1,957	49.7	+26.8
Liberal Democrats	Ha Jaesung	1,787	45.4	+22.6
Conservative	Paul Bedforth*	1,040	26.4	−12.1
Conservative	Terry Paton*	1,026	26.1	−13.1
Conservative	Raju Pandya*	870	22.1	−8.6
Labour	Pat Dobson	513	13.0	−11.6
Labour	Michelle Gordon	498	12.6	−8.4
Labour	David Nelson	459	11.7	−7.2
KIRG	Mary Clark**	407	10.3	N/A
KIRG	Frederick Corbett	240	6.1	N/A
KIRG	Richard Hebborn	236	6.0	N/A
Green	Chris Walker	179	4.5	−11.7
Green	Alex Cotton	164	4.2	N/A
Green	Tariq Shabbeer	130	3.3	N/A
Total votes				
Liberal Democrats gain from Conservative		Swing		
Liberal Democrats gain from Conservative		Swing		
Liberal Democrats gain from Conservative		Swing		

Mary Clark was a sitting councillor, but for Old Malden ward.

=== Canbury ===
Canbury
Party	Candidate	Votes	%	±%
Liberal Democrats	Olivia Boult	2,224	48.6	+25.9
Liberal Democrats	Zain Abbas	2,145	46.9	+25.3
Liberal Democrats	Caroline Kerr	2,121	46.4	+25.5
Conservative	Andrea Craig*	1,643	35.9	−0.8
Conservative	Khadija Rahman	1,270	27.8	−7.4
Conservative	Samuel Shethran	1,248	27.3	−4.8
Labour	Clair Keogh	482	10.5	−5.2
Labour	Chris Priest	429	9.4	−3.0
Labour	Jean Sarhadar	395	8.6	−2.6
KIRG	Caroline Scott	391	8.5	N/A
Green	Joe Holder	331	7.2	−15.9
Green	Mark Greaves	325	7.1	−14.6
Green	Karen Lacey	291	6.4	−8.6
Total votes				
Liberal Democrats gain from Conservative		Swing		
Liberal Democrats gain from Conservative		Swing		
Liberal Democrats gain from Conservative		Swing		

=== Chessington North & Hook ===
Chessington North & Hook
Party	Candidate	Votes	%	±%
Liberal Democrats	Steph Archer	1,709	55.7	+23.0
Liberal Democrats	Margaret Thompson*	1,706	55.6	+19.3
Liberal Democrats	Sharon Young	1,536	50.1	+20.1
Conservative	Andrew Day*	984	32.1	−1.1
Conservative	Phil Doyle**	838	27.3	+0.1
Conservative	Verster du Plessis	784	25.6	−0.1
Labour	Dave Cooper	291	9.5	−4.5
Labour	Tom Prestwich	291	9.5	−2.5
Labour	Lawrence Green	247	8.1	−2.7
Green	Simon Jakeman	197	6.4	−5.1
Green	Kate Worley	88	2.9	N/A
Monster Raving Loony	Chinners Chinnery	82	2.7	N/A
Green	Des Kay	78	2.5	N/A
Total votes				
Liberal Democrats hold		Swing		
Liberal Democrats hold		Swing		
Liberal Democrats gain from Conservative		Swing		

Phil Doyle was a sitting councillor, but for Grove ward.

=== Chessington South ===
Chessington South
Party	Candidate	Votes	%	±%
Liberal Democrats	Patricia Bamford*	1,937	55.9	+18.3
Liberal Democrats	Andreas Kirsch	1,825	52.7	+18.7
Liberal Democrats	Christine Stuart	1,784	51.5	+18.1
Conservative	Andy Johnson-Creek	1,138	32.8	+5.9
Conservative	Sue Towner	1,133	32.7	+8.9
Conservative	Simon Illsley	1,032	29.8	+6.0
Labour	Anna Cunnyngham	314	9.1	−2.8
Labour	David Griffin	273	7.9	−4.6
Labour	Tony Kearns	265	7.6	−3.2
UKIP	Roger Glencross	158	4.6	−20.3
Independent	Michael Basman	109	3.1	N/A
Total votes				
Liberal Democrats hold		Swing		
Liberal Democrats hold		Swing		
Liberal Democrats hold		Swing		

=== Coombe Hill ===
Coombe Hill
Party	Candidate	Votes	%	±%
Conservative	Rowena Bass*	1,456	52.7	−3.8
Conservative	Ian George**	1,423	51.5	−2.1
Conservative	Ed Fram	1,361	49.3	−0.3
Liberal Democrats	Saleem Arif	723	26.2	+11.3
Liberal Democrats	Lubna Maktari	677	24.5	+12.3
Liberal Democrats	Jack Moore	626	22.7	+11.1
Labour	Sally Richardson	427	15.5	−1.3
Labour	Frank Wingate	337	12.2	−4.5
Labour	Paddy Vishani	336	12.2	−2.1
KIRG	Helen Hinton	299	10.8	N/A
Green	Charlie Redman	237	8.6	−4.1
Total votes				
Conservative hold		Swing		
Conservative hold		Swing		
Conservative hold		Swing		

Ian George was a sitting councillor, but for Alexandra ward.

=== Coombe Vale ===
Coombe Vale
Party	Candidate	Votes	%	±%
Liberal Democrats	Kim Bailey	1,795	46.9	+26.9
Liberal Democrats	Munir Ravalia	1,586	41.4	+27.0
Conservative	Roy Arora*	1,511	39.5	−9.1
Conservative	Julie Pickering*	1,508	39.4	−11.0
Liberal Democrats	Jimmy Kent	1,497	39.1	+25.9
Conservative	Cathy Roberts*	1,468	38.3	−10.2
Labour	Ian Parker	393	10.3	−7.8
Labour	Rory Coley	379	9.9	−6.0
Green	John Grant	324	8.5	−1.5
KIRG	Patrick Wylde	324	8.5	N/A
Labour	Gareth Thomas	318	8.3	−6.0
Total votes				
Liberal Democrats gain from Conservative		Swing		
Liberal Democrats gain from Conservative		Swing		
Conservative hold		Swing		

=== Grove ===
Grove
Party	Candidate	Votes	%	±%
Liberal Democrats	Fiona Boult	2,005	59.2	+30.1
Liberal Democrats	Rebekah Moll*	1,904	56.2	+23.8
Liberal Democrats	Jon Tolley*	1,886	55.7	+21.6
Conservative	Catherine Harding	737	21.8	−9.6
Conservative	Phil Nuthall	716	21.2	−10.2
Conservative	Jamila Bibi-Sarwar	603	17.8	−11.9
Labour	Emma Keeley-Francis	441	13.0	−9.9
Labour	Laurie South	433	12.8	−6.1
Labour	Simon Ayre	411	12.1	−4.2
KIRG	Bob Tyler	187	5.5	N/A
Green	Alison Hood	181	5.3	−7.9
Green	Fiona Johnson	177	5.2	N/A
KIRG	Deepa Veneik	143	4.2	N/A
Green	Brian Mulley	97	2.9	N/A
Total votes				
Liberal Democrats hold		Swing		
Liberal Democrats hold		Swing		
Liberal Democrats gain from Conservative		Swing		

=== Norbiton ===
Norbiton
Party	Candidate	Votes	%	±%
Liberal Democrats	Emily Davey	1,904	58.8	+27.7
Liberal Democrats	Dave Ryder-Mills	1,703	52.6	+25.4
Liberal Democrats	Olly Wehring	1,661	51.3	+22.0
Labour	Linsey Cottington*	859	26.5	−10.7
Labour	Phil Bevin	787	24.3	−12.0
Labour	Liz Meerabeau	741	22.9	−8.1
Conservative	Allrik Birch	422	13.0	−5.1
Conservative	Penny Hughes	415	12.8	−3.5
Conservative	Graeme Ferrero	392	12.1	−4.1
Green	Chris Amies	173	5.3	−N/A
Green	Julia Stewart	169	5.2	N/A
Green	Martin Hall	109	3.4	−9.9
KIRG	Kerry Giles	69	2.1	N/A
Total votes				
Liberal Democrats hold		Swing		
Liberal Democrats gain from Labour		Swing		
Liberal Democrats gain from Labour		Swing		

=== Old Malden ===
Old Malden
Party	Candidate	Votes	%	±%
Conservative	Kevin Davis*	1,390	43.9	+3.0
Conservative	Nicola Sheppard	1,363	43.0	−5.4
Conservative	Jason Hughes	1,272	40.1	−4.6
Liberal Democrats	Ian McDonald	1,140	36.0	+13.4
Liberal Democrats	Ghazala Hayata	1,101	34.7	+14.5
Liberal Democrats	Dan Falchikov	1,058	33.4	+14.3
Labour	David Hill	429	13.5	−2.4
Labour	George Pearson	405	12.8	−1.3
Labour	Karen Templeton	359	11.3	−3.0
KIRG	David Fraser*	343	10.8	−37.6
KIRG	Mark Jenkins	201	6.3	N/A
KIRG	Valerie Jenner	174	5.5	N/A
Total votes				
Conservative hold		Swing		
Conservative hold		Swing		
Conservative hold		Swing		

=== St James ===
St James
Party	Candidate	Votes	%	±%
Liberal Democrats	Simon Edwards	1,721	52.0	+27.9
Liberal Democrats	Tim Cobbett	1,663	50.3	+26.5
Liberal Democrats	Annette Wookey	1,493	45.1	+22.0
Conservative	Jack Cheetham*	1,102	33.3	−7.8
Conservative	Ken Smith*	985	29.8	−9.6
Conservative	Caroline Kim	956	28.9	−6.9
Labour	Gerry Jones	384	11.6	−8.2
Labour	Sarah O'Flynn	350	10.6	−5.8
KIRG	Yvonne Tracey	331	10.0	N/A
Labour	Alex Scales	307	9.3	−6.8
UKIP	Linda Holligan	109	3.3	N/A
Total votes				
Liberal Democrats gain from Conservative		Swing		
Liberal Democrats gain from Conservative		Swing		
Liberal Democrats gain from Conservative		Swing		

=== St Mark's ===
St Mark's
Party	Candidate	Votes	%	±%
Liberal Democrats	Liz Green*	1,933	60.0	+19.0
Liberal Democrats	Diane White*	1,837	57.1	+18.4
Liberal Democrats	Yogan Yoganathan*	1,783	55.4	+18.6
Conservative	Ian Wilson	704	21.9	−13.6
Conservative	Calum Paton	640	19.9	−14.5
Conservative	John Peters	636	19.8	−12.2
Labour	Kezia Coleman	499	15.5	+1.5
Labour	Phil Austin	491	15.3	+4.3
Labour	Caoilte O'Connor	404	12.6	+2.3
Green	Kate Jones	179	5.6	−6.2
Green	Patrick Goodacre	160	5.0	−6.1
Green	Patrick Bernard	144	4.5	−4.8
Total votes				
Liberal Democrats hold		Swing		
Liberal Democrats hold		Swing		
Liberal Democrats hold		Swing		

=== Surbiton Hill ===
Surbiton Hill
Party	Candidate	Votes	%	±%
Liberal Democrats	Alison Holt	2,286	64.0	+23.2
Liberal Democrats	Hilary Gander*	2,285	64.0	+23.5
Liberal Democrats	Malcolm Self*	2,102	58.8	+21.7
Conservative	Lucky Kumpeson	862	24.1	−12.4
Conservative	Mimi Small	833	23.3	−11.1
Conservative	Colin Suckling	796	22.3	−9.9
Labour	Johnnie Byrne	348	9.7	−2.2
Green	Michael Firth	294	8.2	−3.3
Labour	David Cottington	280	7.8	−3.5
Labour	Max Freedman	248	6.9	−4.4
Total votes				
Liberal Democrats hold		Swing		
Liberal Democrats hold		Swing		
Liberal Democrats hold		Swing		

=== Tolworth & Hook Rise ===
Tolworth & Hook Rise
Party	Candidate	Votes	%	±%
Liberal Democrats	Lorraine Dunstone*	2,084	64.6	+20.4
Liberal Democrats	Thay Thayalan*	2,012	62.3	+20.5
Liberal Democrats	Dennis Goodship	2,011	62.3	+10.8
Conservative	Sue Hudson	653	20.2	−7.4
Conservative	Jay Ganesh	564	17.5	−8.2
Conservative	Adriana Sakelarova	542	16.8	−3.2
Labour	Tony Banks	473	14.7	−6.9
Labour	Judith Cowley	412	12.8	−6.2
Labour	Greta Farian	392	12.1	−5.0
KIRG	Mike Briggs	193	6.0	N/A
Total votes				
Liberal Democrats hold		Swing		
Liberal Democrats hold		Swing		
Liberal Democrats hold		Swing		

=== Tudor ===
Tudor
Party	Candidate	Votes	%	±%
Conservative	David Cunningham*	1,587	44.8	−4.9
Conservative	Maria Netley*	1,494	42.2	−0.2
Liberal Democrats	Katrina Lidbetter	1,480	41.8	+20.2
Conservative	Hugh Scantlebury*	1,465	41.4	−2.8
Liberal Democrats	James Kerr-Lindsay	1,336	37.7	+16.2
Liberal Democrats	Pim Piers	1,287	36.3	+19.3
Green	Natalie Morgans	366	10.3	−9.0
Labour	Jude Hurtado	328	9.3	−6.4
Labour	Oscar Thorpe	323	9.1	−4.9
Labour	Gareth Smy	282	8.0	−9.3
Green	Carl Myhill	213	6.0	N/A
Green	Sri Viswanatha	185	5.2	N/A
Total votes				
Conservative hold		Swing		
Conservative hold		Swing		
Liberal Democrats gain from Conservative		Swing		

== 2018-2022 by-elections ==
=== 2021 Chessington South by-election ===
The Liberal Democrats selected former Labour MP Andrew Mackinlay as their candidate. Labour selected Charles Bamford, whose mother was a former Liberal Democrat councillor. Noticeably, the Official Monster Raving Loony Party stood thirteen candidates.

Chessington South by-election, 6 May 2021
Party	Candidate	Votes	%	±%
Liberal Democrats	Andrew Mackinlay	1,387	37.2	−18.7
Conservative	Sue Towner	1,278	34.2	+1.5
Labour	Charles Bamford	451	12.0	+2.9
KIRG	Michelle Akintoye	378	10.1	New
Green	Adrian Lulham	139	3.7	New
Monster Raving Loony	Undertaking Director Brunskill	16	0.4	New
Monster Raving Loony	Colonel Cramps	14	0.3	New
Monster Raving Loony	Captain Coily	13	0.3	New
Monster Raving Loony	A.Gent Chinners	12	0.3	New
Monster Raving Loony	Baron Von Achenbach	8	0.2	New
Monster Raving Loony	Duke Diddy Dodd	8	0.2	New
TUSC	Marco Savastio	7	0.1	New
Monster Raving Loony	Casual Count of Corinthian	6	0.1	N/A
Monster Raving Loony	Kingstonian Newt	6	0.1	New
Monster Raving Loony	Landlord Rover	3	0.08	New
Monster Raving Loony	Landlady Lucky	2	0.05	New
Monster Raving Loony	Lady Dave Pither	2	0.05	New
Monster Raving Loony	Sam Joshua Squatch	1	0.03	New
Monster Raving Loony	Rev. Robbie The Radical Recyclist	1	0.03	N/A
Total votes		3,732		
Majority		109	3.0	
Turnout		3,732		
Liberal Democrats hold		Swing		
