= 2014 Kingston upon Thames London Borough Council election =

2014 local election in England

Map of the results of the 2014 Kingston upon Thames council election. Conservatives in blue, Labour in red and Liberal Democrats in yellow.

The 2014 Kingston upon Thames Council election took place on 22 May 2014 to elect members of Kingston upon Thames Council in England. This was on the same day as other local elections.

== Results ==
The Conservative Party gained control from the Liberal Democrats. The Conservatives won 28 seats (+7), the Liberal Democrats won 18 seats (-9) and Labour won 2 seats (+2).

== Results by ward ==
=== Alexandra ===
Alexandra (3)
Party	Candidate	Votes	%	±%
Conservative	Richard Hudson*	1,263	39.1	−2.4
Conservative	Ian George	1,247	38.6	−2.5
Conservative	Chris Hayes	1,188	36.8	−5.2
Liberal Democrats	Haran Kailasapillai	991	30.7	−13.9
Liberal Democrats	Neil Houston	937	29.0	−10.2
Liberal Democrats	Andy Townsend	893	27.6	−7.0
UKIP	Anthony Perham	521	16.1	N/A
Labour	Marilyn Corry	492	15.2	+3.4
Labour	Paul May	485	15.0	+4.3
Labour	Niranjan Jayasundera	441	13.6	+4.6
Green	Phil Smith	331	10.2	+3.3
TUSC	Kevin Foote	78	2.4	N/A
Turnout				
Conservative gain from Liberal Democrats		Swing		
Conservative hold		Swing		
Conservative hold		Swing		

=== Berrylands ===
Berrylands (3)
Party	Candidate	Votes	%	±%
Liberal Democrats	Sushila Abraham*	1,279	38.4	−8.1
Conservative	Mike Head	1,273	38.2	−0.4
Conservative	Andy Johnson	1,237	37.1	−0.7
Liberal Democrats	Thomas Chesterman	1,194	35.8	−2.7
Conservative	Emma Woods	1,149	34.5	−3.1
Liberal Democrats	Bob Steed*	1,040	31.2	−10.3
Green	Martin Lake	426	12.8	+2.7
Labour	Toby Flux	425	12.8	+2.7
Labour	Lawrence Green	424	12.7	+3.2
UKIP	Paul Scargill	384	11.5	N/A
Labour	Amina Rasool	344	10.3	+2.4
TUSC	Italo Savastio	60	1.8	N/A
Turnout				
Liberal Democrats hold		Swing		
Conservative gain from Liberal Democrats		Swing		
Conservative hold		Swing		

=== Beverley ===
Beverley (3)
Party	Candidate	Votes	%	±%
Conservative	Terry Paton*	1,333	39.2	+3.4
Conservative	Paul Bedforth	1,311	38.5	+5.7
Conservative	Raju Pandya	1,046	30.7	−0.8
Liberal Democrats	Lesley Heap	880	25.9	−18.2
Labour	Marian Freedman	838	24.6	+11.1
Liberal Democrats	Simon James*	778	22.9	−19.2
Liberal Democrats	Trevor Heap*	777	22.8	−20.1
Labour	Liz Meerabeau	714	21.0	+9.3
Labour	Chris Priest	645	18.9	+9.1
Green	Chris Walker	552	16.2	+4.2
UKIP	Linda Collis	461	13.5	N/A
Turnout				
Conservative gain from Liberal Democrats		Swing		
Conservative gain from Liberal Democrats		Swing		
Conservative gain from Liberal Democrats		Swing		

=== Canbury ===
Canbury (3)
Party	Candidate	Votes	%	±%
Conservative	Andrea Craig*	1,419	36.7	−3.2
Conservative	Geoff Austin*	1,360	35.2	−3.9
Conservative	David Glasspool	1,241	32.1	−4.4
Green	Ryan Coley	891	23.1	+7.7
Liberal Democrats	Rebekah Moll**	877	22.7	−19.6
Green	Charlie Redman	839	21.7	N/A
Liberal Democrats	Dan Falchikov	833	21.6	−11.4
Liberal Democrats	Andrew King	809	20.9	−9.9
Labour	Tony Cottrell	606	15.7	+3.5
Green	Tariq Shabbeer	580	15.0	N/A
Labour	Colin Startup	477	12.4	+0.8
Labour	Nisha Tailor	431	11.2	+0.4
UKIP	John Anderson	391	10.1	N/A
Independent	Timothy Dennen*	188	4.9	−37.4
Turnout				
Conservative gain from Liberal Democrats		Swing		
Conservative hold		Swing		
Conservative hold		Swing		

Rebekah Moll was a sitting councillor, but for Grove ward.

Timothy Dennen was elected as a Liberal Democrat in 2010.

=== Chessington North & Hook ===
Chessington North & Hook (3)
Party	Candidate	Votes	%	±%
Liberal Democrats	Margaret Thompson*	1,080	36.3	−7.2
Conservative	Andrew Day*	988	33.2	−6.5
Liberal Democrats	Clive Chase	975	32.7	−12.4
Liberal Democrats	Emma-Louise Wykes	893	30.0	−7.6
Conservative	Mike Gibson	811	27.2	−5.8
Conservative	Lizzy Harrall	767	25.7	−7.2
UKIP	Vic Bellamy	718	24.1	N/A
Labour	Steve Kearney	416	14.0	+2.9
Labour	Max Freedman	358	12.0	+1.7
Green	Simon Jakeman	344	11.5	+6.2
Labour	Amanda Stuart	321	10.8	+1.3
Turnout				
Liberal Democrats hold		Swing		
Conservative hold		Swing		
Liberal Democrats hold		Swing		

=== Chessington South ===
Chessington South (3)
Party	Candidate	Votes	%	±%
Liberal Democrats	Patricia Bamford*	1,131	37.6	−10.9
Liberal Democrats	Rachel Reid*	1,024	34.0	−8.4
Liberal Democrats	Shiraz Mirza*	1,005	33.4	−10.1
Conservative	Ryan Boxall	810	26.9	−8.5
UKIP	Gina Healy	750	24.9	N/A
UKIP	Coral Cottle	742	24.7	N/A
Conservative	Michelle Akintoye	717	23.8	−10.5
Conservative	Tania Symes	715	23.8	−10.2
Labour	David Griffin	376	12.5	+0.2
Labour	John Dodwell	358	11.9	+3.2
Labour	Anthony Murray	326	10.8	+3.1
TUSC	Louis Desbruslais	125	4.2	N/A
Turnout				
Liberal Democrats hold		Swing		
Liberal Democrats hold		Swing		
Liberal Democrats hold		Swing		

=== Coombe Hill ===
Coombe Hill (3)
Party	Candidate	Votes	%	±%
Conservative	Rowena Bass	1,537	56.5	+2.5
Conservative	Erica Humphrey*	1,458	53.6	+2.9
Conservative	Gaj Wallooppillai*	1,349	49.6	−2.2
Labour	Sally Richardson	457	16.8	+5.9
Labour	Edward Naylor	453	16.7	+5.5
Liberal Democrats	Iris Grender	406	14.9	−14.0
Labour	Roger Price	388	14.3	+4.2
Green	Jean Vidler	344	12.7	+4.1
Liberal Democrats	John Waddleton	332	12.2	−14.1
Liberal Democrats	Jonathan Oates	314	11.6	−10.8
UKIP	Tina Collis	313	11.5	N/A
Turnout				
Conservative hold		Swing		
Conservative hold		Swing		
Conservative hold		Swing		

=== Coombe Vale ===
Coombe Vale (3)
Party	Candidate	Votes	%	±%
Conservative	Julie Pickering*	1,689	50.4	+4.1
Conservative	Roy Arora	1,629	48.6	+6.7
Conservative	Cathy Roberts	1,625	48.5	+6.8
Liberal Democrats	Julie Haines	671	20.0	−20.1
Labour	Ian Parker	605	18.1	+7.4
Labour	Sushil Pallen	531	15.9	+5.7
Liberal Democrats	Peter Herlinger	482	14.4	−21.5
Labour	Geoff Parnell	480	14.3	+4.9
Liberal Democrats	Phil Thompson	442	13.2	−21.8
UKIP	Janet Owen	350	10.4	N/A
Green	Mariana Periklis	334	10.0	+2.1
Green	Mona Ghobadi	323	9.6	N/A
Green	Mike Perry	317	9.5	N/A
Turnout				
Conservative hold		Swing		
Conservative hold		Swing		
Conservative hold		Swing		

=== Grove ===
Grove (3)
Party	Candidate	Votes	%	±%
Liberal Democrats	Chrissie Hitchcock*	1,041	34.1	−17.5
Liberal Democrats	Stephen Brister**	990	32.4	−16.4
Conservative	Phil Doyle	960	31.4	+1.3
Conservative	Adrian Amer	958	31.4	+0.7
Conservative	Alex Ward	906	29.7	+1.3
Liberal Democrats	Shoaib Bajwa	888	29.1	−12.5
Labour	Tessa Kind	699	22.9	+10.3
Labour	Steve Mama	577	18.9	+7.0
Labour	Peter Roland	497	16.3	+4.5
Green	Alison Hood	404	13.2	−1.4
Green	Tim Cobbett	384	12.6	N/A
Green	Tim Walker	366	12.0	N/A
Turnout				
Liberal Democrats hold		Swing		
Liberal Democrats hold		Swing		
Conservative gain from Liberal Democrats		Swing		

Stephen Brister was a sitting councillor, but for Norbiton ward.

=== Norbiton ===
Norbiton (3)
Party	Candidate	Votes	%	±%
Labour	Linsey Cottington	1,013	37.2	+9.2
Labour	Sheila Griffin	988	36.3	+21.3
Liberal Democrats	Bill Brisbane	847	31.1	−10.7
Labour	Laurie South	844	31.0	+8.3
Liberal Democrats	Penny Shelton*	796	29.3	−13.7
Liberal Democrats	David Ryder-Mills*	741	27.2	−13.4
Conservative	Holly Morris	493	18.1	−5.3
Conservative	Jemima Davis	444	16.3	−2.2
Conservative	Susan Hudson	441	16.2	−0.9
Green	Martin Hall	363	13.3	+2.8
UKIP	Pete Withers	339	12.5	N/A
TUSC	Ellie Evans	83	3.1	N/A
Turnout				
Labour gain from Liberal Democrats		Swing		
Labour gain from Liberal Democrats		Swing		
Liberal Democrats hold		Swing		

Sheila Griffin was a Labour councillor prior to 2010, when she stood as an Independent. Changes in her vote share are from her performance as an Independent in 2010, rather than the Labour candidate.

=== Old Malden ===
Old Malden (3)
Party	Candidate	Votes	%	±%
Conservative	David Fraser	1,461	48.4	+1.9
Conservative	Mary Clark	1,348	44.7	+0.2
Conservative	Kevin Davis	1,233	40.9	+1.3
Liberal Democrats	David Bamford	682	22.6	−15.0
Liberal Democrats	Kim Mi-soon	610	20.2	−17.1
Liberal Democrats	Richard Thompson	575	19.1	−14.1
UKIP	Nicholas Collis	573	19.0	N/A
Labour	Bill Bennett	480	15.9	+6.0
Labour	Ian Kellett	433	14.3	+5.0
Labour	George Pearson	425	14.1	+5.4
Green	Lucy Howard	328	10.9	+5.8
Turnout				
Conservative hold		Swing		
Conservative hold		Swing		
Conservative hold		Swing		

=== St James ===
St James (3)
Party	Candidate	Votes	%	±%
Conservative	Howard Jones*	1,250	41.1	−3.6
Conservative	Ken Smith*	1,188	39.4	−3.9
Conservative	Priyen Patel*	1,082	35.8	−1.6
Liberal Democrats	Jason Ha	729	24.1	−10.4
Liberal Democrats	Montse Medina	719	23.8	−9.6
Liberal Democrats	Annette Wookey	696	23.1	−5.4
Labour	Gerry Jones	598	19.8	+0.1
Labour	Mary Masters	494	16.4	+5.0
Labour	Eric Masters	485	16.1	+4.6
UKIP	Linda Holligan	386	12.8	+7.0
UKIP	Bona Watson	361	12.0	N/A
Green	Richard Senger	212	7.0	−0.6
BNP	David Child	100	3.3	N/A
TUSC	Paul Couchman	34	1.1	N/A
Turnout				
Conservative hold		Swing		
Conservative hold		Swing		
Conservative hold		Swing		

=== St Mark's ===
St Mark's (3)
Party	Candidate	Votes	%	±%
Liberal Democrats	Elizabeth Green*	1,239	41.0	−10.1
Liberal Democrats	Diane White	1,170	38.7	−9.0
Liberal Democrats	Yogan Yoganathan*	1,111	36.8	−5.6
Conservative	Jack Cheetham	1,071	35.5	−0.6
Conservative	Nathan Johnson-Paul	1,038	34.4	−1.1
Conservative	Pratik Shah	968	32.0	−2.1
Labour	Sandra Coombs	423	14.0	+3.5
Green	Karen Hardy	357	11.8	+0.4
Green	Clare Keogh	334	11.1	N/A
Labour	Martin Johnson	331	11.0	+1.3
Labour	Michael Morton	312	10.3	+3.0
Green	Alex Nelson	282	9.3	N/A
TUSC	Jack Beswick	67	2.2	N/A
Turnout				
Liberal Democrats hold		Swing		
Liberal Democrats hold		Swing		
Liberal Democrats hold		Swing		

=== Surbiton Hill ===
Surbiton Hill (3)
Party	Candidate	Votes	%	±%
Liberal Democrats	John Ayles*	1,454	40.8	−3.5
Liberal Democrats	Hilary Gander	1,445	40.5	+0.4
Liberal Democrats	Malcolm Self*	1,323	37.1	−5.1
Conservative	Peter Kelk	1,301	36.5	−1.7
Conservative	Alex Wright	1,229	34.4	−3.0
Conservative	Ronak Pandya	1,147	32.1	−3.7
Labour	Richard Heys	426	11.9	+2.7
Green	Brian Mulley	410	11.5	+3.2
Labour	Anne Vase	403	11.3	+2.7
Labour	David Cooper	402	11.3	−0.5
UKIP	Carol Ward	354	9.9	N/A
Turnout				
Liberal Democrats hold		Swing		
Liberal Democrats hold		Swing		
Liberal Democrats hold		Swing		

=== Tolworth and Hook Rise ===
Tolworth and Hook Rise (3)
Party	Candidate	Votes	%	±%
Liberal Democrats	Vicki Harris*	1,030	51.5	−2.0
Liberal Democrats	Lorraine Rolfe	885	44.2	−8.3
Liberal Democrats	Thay Thayalan	836	41.8	−1.9
Conservative	Mike Briggs	554	27.6	−1.7
Conservative	Mavis Cracknell	515	25.7	+0.2
Labour	Tony Banks	433	21.6	+8.6
UKIP	David Henson	430	21.5	N/A
Conservative	Lucy Kumpeson	401	20.0	−7.2
Labour	Katie Hill	381	19.0	+8.0
Labour	Ben Miller	343	17.1	+6.7
TUSC	Ian Robertson	86	4.3	N/A
Turnout				
Liberal Democrats hold		Swing		
Liberal Democrats hold		Swing		
Liberal Democrats hold		Swing		

=== Tudor ===
Tudor (3)
Party	Candidate	Votes	%	±%
Conservative	David Cunningham*	1,617	49.7	−2.5
Conservative	Hugh Scantlebury	1,437	44.2	−3.3
Conservative	Frank Thompson*	1,378	42.4	−2.1
Liberal Democrats	Jac Lott	701	21.6	−16.2
Liberal Democrats	Anne-Marie Haddon	698	21.5	−10.3
Green	Chris Murphy	629	19.3	+8.3
Labour	Bob Smy	561	17.3	+7.0
Liberal Democrats	Maha Alfakier	554	17.0	−12.9
Labour	Judith Cowley	511	15.7	+5.6
Labour	Philip Gregg	455	14.0	+5.9
UKIP	John Warne	445	13.7	N/A
Turnout				
Conservative hold		Swing		
Conservative hold		Swing		
Conservative hold		Swing		

== By-elections: 2014–2018 ==
A by-election was held in Tudor ward following the resignation of Frank Thompson.

Tudor by-election, 16 October 2014
Party	Candidate	Votes	%	±%
Conservative	Maria Netley	1,062	41.0	+0.1
Liberal Democrats	Marilyn Mason	725	28.0	+10.3
Labour	Christopher Priest	314	12.1	−2.1
UKIP	Benjamin Roberts	269	10.4	−0.9
Green	Ryan Coley	219	8.5	−7.4
Majority		337	13.0	
Conservative hold		Swing		

A by-election was held in St James ward following the death of Howard Jones.

St James by-election, 18 December 2014
Party	Candidate	Votes	%	±%
Conservative	Jack Cheetham	1,123	42.9	+5.1
Liberal Democrats	Annette Wookey	865	33.0	+11.0
Labour	Stephen Dunkling	355	13.5	−4.6
UKIP	Benjamin Roberts	206	7.9	−3.8
Green	Alexander Nelson	71	2.7	−3.7
Majority		258	9.9	
Conservative hold		Swing		

A by-election was held in Grove ward following the resignation of Stephen Brister.

Grove by-election, 7 May 2015
Party	Candidate	Votes	%	±%
Liberal Democrats	Rebekah Moll	1,634	32.1	−1.4
Conservative	Jason Hughes	1,616	31.8	+0.9
Labour	Laurie South	853	16.8	−5.7
Green	Tim Cobbett	458	9.0	−4.0
UKIP	John Anderson	241	4.7	N/A
Independent	Jon Tolley	238	4.7	N/A
TUSC	Gabrielle Thorpe	44	0.9	N/A
Majority		18	0.3	
Liberal Democrats hold		Swing		

A by-election was held in Tolworth and Hook Rise ward following the resignation of Vicki Harris.

Tolworth and Hook Rise, 7 May 2015
Party	Candidate	Votes	%	±%
Liberal Democrats	Tom Davies	1,729	34.1	−6.6
Conservative	Ronak Pandya	1,579	31.1	+9.2
Labour	Tony Banks	898	17.7	+0.6
UKIP	Vic Bellamy	514	10.1	−6.9
Green	Nik Way	206	4.1	N/A
Independent	Mike Briggs	120	2.4	N/A
TUSC	Dan Celardi	29	0.6	−2.8
Majority		150	3.0	
Liberal Democrats hold		Swing		

A by-election was held in Grove ward following the death of Chrissie Hitchcock.

Grove by-election, 16 July 2015
Party	Candidate	Votes	%	±%
Liberal Democrats	Jon Tolley	1,577	59.9	+26.4
Conservative	Jenny Lewington	688	26.1	−4.8
Labour	Laurie South	223	8.5	−14.0
Green	Clare Keogh	88	3.3	−9.7
UKIP	John Anderson	58	2.2	N/A
Majority		889	33.8	
Liberal Democrats hold		Swing		
