= 2002 Kingston upon Thames London Borough Council election =

2002 local election in England

Map of the results of the 2002 Kingston upon Thames council election. Conservatives in blue, Labour in red and Liberal Democrats in yellow.

Elections to Kingston upon Thames Borough Council were held on 2 May 2002. The whole council was up for election with boundary changes reducing the number of councillors by two since the last election in 1998. The Liberal Democrats took overall control of the council.

== Election result ==
Kingston upon Thames local election result 2002
Party	Seats	Gains	Losses	Net gain/loss	Seats %	Votes %	Votes	+/−
Liberal Democrats	30			+11	62.5	48.8	56,511	
Conservative	15			-6	31.3	35.8	41,529	
Labour	3			-7	6.3	11.7	13,604	
Green	0	0	0	0	0.0	2.2	2,522	
CPA	0	0	0	0	0.0	1.5	1,687	

== Ward results ==
=== Alexandra ===
Alexandra (3)
Party	Candidate	Votes	%	±%
Liberal Democrats	David Berry	1,395	51.8	
Liberal Democrats	Patricia Franks	1,289	47.8	
Liberal Democrats	Robert Blevin	1,272	47.2	
Conservative	Keith Witham*	1,089	40.4	
Conservative	Caroline Salsbury	1,088	40.4	
Conservative	Elizabeth Griffiths	1,067	39.6	
Labour	Judith Cowley	203	7.5	
Labour	David Long	203	7.5	
Labour	John Woodman	149	5.5	
CPA	Roger Fuller	83	3.1	
Turnout		7,821	42.8	

=== Berrylands ===
Berrylands (3)
Party	Candidate	Votes	%	±%
Conservative	Kevin Davis*	1,205	49.3	
Conservative	Maureen Rowley	1,067	43.7	
Conservative	David Booth*	1,066	43.6	
Liberal Democrats	Kevin Davis	876	35.8	
Liberal Democrats	Andrew Bull	872	35.7	
Liberal Democrats	Susan Goodship	845	34.5	
Labour	Joanne Agnew	325	13.3	
Labour	Anthony Banks	321	13.1	
Labour	William Brown	291	11.9	
CPA	Sarah Daniell	111	4.5	
Turnout		6,979	37.9	

=== Beverley ===
Beverley (3)
Party	Candidate	Votes	%	±%
Liberal Democrats	Derek Osbourne*	1,653	55.8	
Liberal Democrats	Donald Jordan*	1,632	55.1	
Liberal Democrats	Simon James	1,609	54.3	
Conservative	Julian Duffy	945	31.9	
Conservative	Celia Flynn	939	31.7	
Conservative	Christopher Quinlan	889	30.0	
Labour	Duncan Braithwaite	249	8.4	
Labour	Joseph Freedman	236	8.0	
Labour	Gerald Jones	218	7.4	
CPA	Douglas Gibbons	117	3.9	
Turnout		8,487	46.9	

=== Canbury ===
Canbury (3)
Party	Candidate	Votes	%	±%
Liberal Democrats	Anthony Blurton	1,278	43.6	
Liberal Democrats	Penelope Shelton	1,215	41.4	
Liberal Democrats	Amtul Malik	1,149	39.2	
Conservative	Andrew Lee	751	25.6	
Conservative	Karen Gray	718	24.5	
Conservative	James Griffin	714	24.3	
Labour	Norma Brewer	692	23.6	
Labour	Christopher Priest*	649	22.1	
Labour	Daljit Sehbai	639	21.8	
Green	Brian Holmes	259	8.8	
Green	John Southgate	234	8.0	
Green	Gordon Masterton	177	6.0	
CPA	Abigail Hernan	62	2.1	
Turnout		8,537	43.3	

=== Chessington North and Hook ===
Chessington North and Hook (3)
Party	Candidate	Votes	%	±%
Liberal Democrats	Ian Reid*	1,698	70.1	
Liberal Democrats	Katharine Reid*	1,674	69.1	
Liberal Democrats	Susan Baker	1,665	68.7	
Conservative	Peter Osborne	510	21.1	
Conservative	Anthony Geater	485	20.0	
Conservative	Albertine Gaur	483	19.9	
Labour	Judith Cowley	166	6.9	
Labour	Richard Wilson	154	6.4	
Labour	Shaun McLoughlin	140	5.8	
Turnout		6,975	40.1	

=== Chessington South ===
Chessington South (3)
Party	Candidate	Votes	%	±%
Liberal Democrats	Patricia Bamford*	1,554	58.8	
Liberal Democrats	Martin Blakebrough	1,484	56.1	
Liberal Democrats	Shiraz Mirza*	1,389	52.5	
Conservative	Daphne Johnston	768	29.0	
Conservative	Michael Head	753	28.5	
Conservative	Malcolm Johnston	747	28.3	
Labour	Jeffrey Hanna	193	7.3	
Labour	Matthew MacKinlay	191	7.2	
Labour	Peter Hurst	182	6.9	
Green	Ann Bainbridge	165	6.2	
CPA	Anthony May	55	2.1	
CPA	Susan May	46	1.7	
Turnout		7,527	39.2	

=== Coombe Hill ===
Coombe Hill (3)
Party	Candidate	Votes	%	±%
Conservative	Robin Codd*	1,368	66.4	
Conservative	David Edwards*	1,329	64.5	
Conservative	Eric Humphrey*	1,307	63.4	
Liberal Democrats	Susan Baxter	393	19.1	
Liberal Democrats	David Knowles	390	18.9	
Liberal Democrats	Mary Watts	375	18.2	
Labour	Paul Fouracre	165	8.0	
Labour	Roger Price	156	7.6	
Labour	Helen Williams	138	6.7	
Green	Martin Lake	125	6.1	
Green	Christopher Spruce	118	5.7	
Green	Carol Vagg	103	5.0	
Turnout		5,967	31.2	

=== Coombe Vale ===
Coombe Vale (3)
Party	Candidate	Votes	%	±%
Liberal Democrats	Julie Haines*	1,268	42.0	
Liberal Democrats	Paul Brill	1,266	41.9	
Conservative	Anna Flagg	1,234	40.9	
Conservative	Adrian Holder	1,234	40.9	
Conservative	Peter Crerar*	1,199	39.7	
Liberal Democrats	David Ryder-Mills	1,181	39.1	
CPA	Peter Flower	227	7.5	
CPA	Sandra Flower	219	7.3	
Labour	Marilyn Corry	203	6.7	
CPA	Paul Jacobs	202	6.7	
Labour	Barry Bennett	192	6.4	
Labour	Colin Startup	135	4.5	
Green	Eleanor Gordon	112	3.7	
Green	Duncan Gordon	107	3.5	
Turnout		8,779	48.0	

=== Grove ===
Grove (3)
Party	Candidate	Votes	%	±%
Liberal Democrats	Christine Hitchcock*	1,290	58.7	
Liberal Democrats	Roger Hayes*	1,287	58.5	
Liberal Democrats	Bart Rickets	1,172	53.3	
Conservative	Adrian Beales	616	28.0	
Conservative	Leslie Blake	603	27.4	
Conservative	Paul Richardson	576	26.2	
Green	Hilary James	148	6.7	
Labour	Nora Pearce	142	6.5	
Labour	Laurence South	132	6.0	
Labour	Niranjan Jayasundera	122	5.5	
Green	Satin Dattani	115	5.2	
Green	Michael Seviour	99	4.5	
CPA	Anthea Colledge	42	1.9	
Turnout		6,344	36.0	

=== Norbiton ===
Norbiton (3)
Party	Candidate	Votes	%	±%
Labour	Steven Mama*	872	42.6	
Labour	Edgar Naylor*	810	39.5	
Labour	Sheila Griffin	769	37.5	
Liberal Democrats	Frances Coyne	661	32.3	
Liberal Democrats	Vicki Cobb	607	29.6	
Liberal Democrats	Wyn Evans*	605	29.5	
Conservative	Gavin French	380	18.5	
Conservative	Margaret Hurst	361	17.6	
Conservative	Geoffrey Turner	334	16.3	
Green	Julian Jones	144	7.0	
Green	Jon Clarke	125	6.1	
Green	Cedric Knight	103	5.0	
CPA	Helen Priest	37	1.8	
Turnout		5,808	36.1	

=== Old Malden ===
Old Malden (3)
Party	Candidate	Votes	%	±%
Liberal Democrats	Ian McDonald*	1,638	59.0	
Liberal Democrats	Dilys Coy	1,554	56.0	
Liberal Democrats	Ghazala Hayat	1,480	53.3	
Conservative	Michael Amson*	965	34.8	
Conservative	Kenneth Smith	924	33.3	
Conservative	Mohammed Khan	558	20.1	
Labour	Robert Kellett	154	5.5	
Labour	George Pearson	153	5.5	
Labour	Warren Kloman	143	5.2	
CPA	Roger Glencross	93	3.4	
Turnout		7,662	43.1	

=== St James ===
St James (3)
Party	Candidate	Votes	%	±%
Conservative	David Fraser*	1,087	47.7	
Conservative	Howard Jones	1,021	44.8	
Liberal Democrats	Geraldine Osbourne	937	41.2	
Conservative	Rajendra Pandya*	918	40.3	
Liberal Democrats	Peter Grender	889	39.0	
Liberal Democrats	Robert Eyre-Brook	871	38.3	
Labour	Iris Clifford	239	10.5	
Labour	John Knowles	180	7.9	
Labour	Francis White	161	7.1	
CPA	Eleanor Glencross	118	5.2	
Turnout		6,421	37.8	

=== St Mark's ===
St Mark's (3)
Party	Candidate	Votes	%	±%
Liberal Democrats	Elizabeth Shard	1,721	70.9	
Liberal Democrats	Barry O'Mahony	1,701	70.1	
Liberal Democrats	Mylvaganam Yoganathan	1,659	68.4	
Conservative	Ian George	533	22.0	
Conservative	Gordon Johnson	515	21.2	
Conservative	Janet Witham	514	21.2	
Labour	James Waterworth	129	5.3	
Labour	Anne Vase	120	4.9	
Labour	Geoffrey Parnell	114	4.7	
CPA	Thomas Borrough	58	2.4	
Turnout		7,064	35.5	

=== Surbiton Hill ===
Surbiton Hill (3)
Party	Candidate	Votes	%	±%
Conservative	Janet Bowen-Hitchings*	1,058	44.9	
Conservative	Jane Smith*	1,036	43.9	
Conservative	Paul Johnston*	1,016	43.1	
Liberal Democrats	Sheila Cochrane	950	40.3	
Liberal Democrats	Theresa McCahill	907	38.5	
Liberal Democrats	Peter Simonsson	880	37.3	
Labour	Phillip Cooper	308	13.1	
Labour	Andrew Hall*	283	12.0	
Labour	Lawrence Green	274	11.6	
CPA	Kenneth Scrimshaw	87	3.7	
Turnout		6,799	34.5	

=== Tolworth and Hook Rise ===
Tolworth and Hook Rise (3)
Party	Candidate	Votes	%	±%
Liberal Democrats	Rolson Davies*	1,591	59.1	
Liberal Democrats	Victoria Harris*	1,507	56.0	
Liberal Democrats	Robert Lee	1,457	54.1	
Labour	Rory Faulkner*	503	18.7	
Conservative	Krishnapillar Srisaravanapauaan	497	18.5	
Labour	Jeremy Thorn*	496	18.4	
Conservative	Leslie Wilson	496	18.4	
Conservative	Nithyalak Kumpeson	495	18.4	
Labour	Marian Darke*	490	18.2	
CPA	Doreen Scrimshaw	75	2.8	
Turnout		7,607	42.2	

=== Tudor ===
Tudor (3)
Party	Candidate	Votes	%	±%
Conservative	David Cunningham*	1,422	57.8	
Conservative	Dennis Doe*	1,346	54.7	
Conservative	Frank Thompson	1,303	52.9	
Liberal Democrats	Richard Lillicrap	614	24.9	
Liberal Democrats	Claire Jackson	588	23.9	
Liberal Democrats	David Walter	523	21.3	
Labour	Brian Morris	282	11.5	
Labour	Geoffrey Malseed	276	11.2	
Labour	Noel Hamel	262	10.6	
Green	Anne Murphy	235	9.5	
Green	Anthony Stokoe	153	6.2	
CPA	Keli Hopewell	55	2.2	
Turnout		7,059	39.9	
