= 2010 Kingston upon Thames London Borough Council election =

2010 local election in England

Map of the results of the 2010 Kingston upon Thames council election. Conservatives in blue and Liberal Democrats in yellow.

Elections for the London Borough of Kingston upon Thames were held on 6 May 2010. The Liberal Democrats retained control of the council with an increased majority of six.

== Results ==
Kingston upon Thames Council election result 2010
Party	Seats	Gains	Losses	Net gain/loss	Seats %	Votes %	Votes	+/−
Liberal Democrats	27	5	3	+2	56.0	43%		
Conservative	21	3	3	0	44.0	40%		
Labour	0	0	2	-2	0.0	12%		

== Results by ward ==
=== Alexandra ===
Alexandra (3)
Party	Candidate	Votes	%	±%
Liberal Democrats	John Burgess	2,169	44.6	−0.6
Conservative	Michael Burden	2,046	42.0	−1.9
Conservative	Richard Hudson*	2,022	41.5	−3.9
Conservative	Ian George*	2,003	41.1	−3.1
Liberal Democrats	Terence Hazzard	1,909	39.2	−3.8
Liberal Democrats	Kalpen Patel	1,683	34.6	−7.2
Labour	Marian Freedman	576	11.8	+5.3
Labour	Lawrence Green	522	10.7	+4.3
Labour	Anna Ring	439	9.0	+3.6
Green	Phil Smith	334	6.9	N/A
CPA	Samantha Jacobs	107	2.2	N/A
CPA	Barbara Zhang	74	1.5	N/A
Liberal Democrats hold		Swing		
Conservative hold		Swing		
Conservative hold		Swing		

=== Berrylands ===
Berrylands (3)
Party	Candidate	Votes	%	±%
Liberal Democrats	Frances Moseley*	2,333	46.5	−0.6
Liberal Democrats	Bob Steed*	2,080	41.5	−2.6
Conservative	Karen George	1,939	38.6	−3.6
Liberal Democrats	Rohan Yoganathan*	1,933	38.5	−3.9
Conservative	David Hutchinson	1,894	37.8	−3.0
Conservative	Peter Topp	1,884	37.6	−2.9
Labour	John Lee	508	10.1	+4.9
Green	Martin Lake	507	10.1	+0.1
Labour	Charlotte Ward	477	9.5	+3.6
Labour	Alasdair Reisner	396	7.9	+3.3
CPA	Anna Lofts	92	1.8	−1.1
CPA	Paul Jacobs	89	1.8	N/A
CPA	Jonathan Rudd	84	1.7	N/A
Liberal Democrats hold		Swing		
Liberal Democrats hold		Swing		
Conservative gain from Liberal Democrats		Swing		

=== Beverley ===
Beverley (3)
Party	Candidate	Votes	%	±%
Liberal Democrats	Derek Osbourne*	2,138	44.1	−2.2
Liberal Democrats	Trevor Heap	2,081	42.9	−3.9
Liberal Democrats	Simon James*	2,044	42.1	−4.4
Conservative	Caroline Bowis	1,738	35.8	+4.5
Conservative	Darren Spraggs	1,591	32.8	+3.6
Conservative	Mike Head	1,530	31.5	−1.0
Labour	Duncan Braithwaite	657	13.5	+4.0
Green	Chris Walker	581	12.0	−1.9
Labour	Roger Price	566	11.7	+2.5
Labour	Dyan Sellayah	474	9.8	+0.8
CPA	Valerie Hancock	158	3.3	−0.9
CPA	David Campanale	139	2.9	−0.2
CPA	Mark Riley	139	2.9	+0.2
Liberal Democrats hold		Swing		
Liberal Democrats hold		Swing		
Liberal Democrats hold		Swing		

=== Canbury ===
Canbury (3)
Party	Candidate	Votes	%	±%
Liberal Democrats	Timothy Dennen	2,469	42.3	+2.4
Conservative	Andrea Craig	2,333	39.9	+1.1
Conservative	Geoffrey Austin*	2,283	39.1	−1.3
Conservative	Hamish Pritchard	2,131	36.5	−1.4
Liberal Democrats	Maha Alfakier	1,927	33.0	−4.1
Liberal Democrats	Bart Ricketts	1,801	30.8	−4.6
Green	Johanna Hunt	899	15.4	−1.4
Labour	Katie Hill	711	12.2	−0.3
Labour	Colin Startup	678	11.6	+0.5
Labour	Chris Priest	630	10.8	+0.1
Liberal Democrats hold		Swing		
Conservative hold		Swing		
Conservative hold		Swing		

=== Chessington North & Hook ===
Chessington North & Hook (3)
Party	Candidate	Votes	%	±%
Liberal Democrats	Alan Dean	1,990	45.1	−0.2
Liberal Democrats	Margaret Thompson	1,921	43.5	−1.3
Conservative	Andrew Day	1,754	39.7	−4.3
Liberal Democrats	Ivor Knight	1,662	37.6	−7.1
Conservative	Jamal Chohan	1,457	33.0	−5.9
Conservative	Maundy Todd	1,454	32.9	−4.9
Labour	Steve Kearney	490	11.1	+3.3
Labour	Dick Bradford	453	10.3	+1.8
Labour	Tony Cottrell	419	9.5	+2.0
Green	Christine Sherlock	233	5.3	N/A
CPA	Anthony May	139	3.1	N/A
CPA	Wendy Pickard	104	2.4	N/A
CPA	Doreen Scrimshaw	63	1.4	N/A
Liberal Democrats hold		Swing		
Liberal Democrats hold		Swing		
Conservative gain from Liberal Democrats		Swing		

=== Chessington South ===
Chessington South (3)
Party	Candidate	Votes	%	±%
Liberal Democrats	Patricia Bamford*	2,455	48.5	−2.0
Liberal Democrats	Shiraz Mirza*	2,202	43.5	−4.7
Liberal Democrats	Rachel Reid	2,148	42.4	−4.0
Conservative	Maureen Rowley	1,794	35.4	−0.9
Conservative	Michelle Akintoye	1,738	34.3	−1.3
Conservative	Colin Suckling	1,722	34.0	+2.3
Labour	Bill Davies	621	12.3	+1.3
Labour	John Dodwell	439	8.7	−1.7
Labour	Vilma Watt	389	7.7	−1.9
Independent	John Hayball	207	4.1	+0.3
CPA	Susan May	149	2.9	−0.2
CPA	Martin Pickard	128	2.5	−1.3
CPA	Maria Pereira	113	2.2	N/A
Liberal Democrats hold		Swing		
Liberal Democrats hold		Swing		
Liberal Democrats hold		Swing		

=== Coombe Hill ===
Coombe Hill (3)
Party	Candidate	Votes	%	±%
Conservative	Patrick Codd*	2,455	54.0	−15.0
Conservative	David Edwards*	2,354	51.8	−14.7
Conservative	Eric Humphrey*	2,304	50.7	−13.2
Liberal Democrats	David Knowles	1,314	28.9	+11.6
Liberal Democrats	Eleanor Tatler	1,194	26.3	+12.6
Liberal Democrats	Jonathan Oates	1,019	22.4	+6.2
Labour	Judith Cowley	521	11.5	+2.3
Labour	Sally Richardson	495	10.9	+2.3
Labour	Ian Parker	458	10.1	+2.9
Green	Jean Vidler	391	8.6	−1.4
CPA	Philippa Hayward	82	1.8	−1.5
CPA	Alex Priest	77	1.7	N/A
CPA	Funkazi Koroye-Crooks	68	1.5	N/A
Conservative hold		Swing		
Conservative hold		Swing		
Conservative hold		Swing		

=== Coombe Vale ===
Coombe Vale (3)
Party	Candidate	Votes	%	±%
Conservative	Adrian Holder*	2,306	46.3	−5.1
Conservative	Robert-John Tasker*	2,084	41.9	−7.2
Conservative	James White*	2,074	41.7	−8.8
Liberal Democrats	Julie Haines	1,995	40.1	+7.6
Liberal Democrats	Kamal Kugan	1,784	35.9	+6.7
Liberal Democrats	Mary Watts	1,743	35.0	+8.7
Labour	Anthony Murray	531	10.7	+2.0
Labour	Jak Codd	508	10.2	+2.6
Labour	Michael Morton	469	9.4	+1.9
Green	Nighat Taimuri	391	7.9	−1.3
CPA	Jennifer Riley	145	2.9	−4.1
CPA	Rajesh Dewan	129	2.6	−2.2
CPA	Esther Priest	111	2.2	−1.2
Conservative hold		Swing		
Conservative hold		Swing		
Conservative hold		Swing		

=== Grove ===
Grove (3)
Party	Candidate	Votes	%	±%
Liberal Democrats	Chrissie Hitchcock*	2,527	51.6	+3.8
Liberal Democrats	Barry O'Mahony**	2,391	48.8	+6.1
Liberal Democrats	Marc Woodall	2,037	41.6	+1.3
Conservative	Adrian Amer	1,505	30.7	−2.1
Conservative	Terry Bowers	1,475	30.1	−5.4
Conservative	James Pirret	1,390	28.4	−3.1
Green	Ryan Bridgewater	713	14.6	−3.6
Labour	Bill Bennett	618	12.6	+3.3
Labour	Laurence South	584	11.9	+3.7
Labour	Amand Stuart	576	11.8	+3.5
Independent	Denise Norman	272	5.6	N/A
Liberal Democrats hold		Swing		
Liberal Democrats hold		Swing		
Liberal Democrats hold		Swing		

Barry O'Mahony was a sitting councillor, but for St Mark's ward.

=== Norbiton ===
Norbiton (3)
Party	Candidate	Votes	%	±%
Liberal Democrats	Penny Shelton*	1,799	43.0	+5.9
Liberal Democrats	Stephen Brister	1,748	41.8	+9.5
Liberal Democrats	David Ryder-Mills**	1,698	40.6	+9.0
Labour	Stephen Mama*	1,170	28.0	−11.0
Conservative	Leslie Blake	978	23.4	+4.8
Labour	Susanna Bellino	950	22.7	−15.2
Labour	Stella Simpson	860	20.6	−16.1
Conservative	Romana Chohan	774	18.5	+2.0
Conservative	Liu Yang	715	17.1	+1.0
Independent	Sheila Griffin*	628	15.0	−22.9
Green	Martin Hall	437	10.5	−2.2
Liberal Democrats hold		Swing		
Liberal Democrats hold		Swing		
Liberal Democrats hold		Swing		

David Ryder-Mills was a sitting councillor, but for Canbury ward.

Sheila Griffin had been elected in 2006 as a Labour councillor.

=== Old Malden ===
Old Malden (3)
Party	Candidate	Votes	%	±%
Conservative	David Fraser*	2,363	46.5	−0.5
Conservative	Mick Amson*	2,262	44.5	−0.3
Conservative	Kate Stinton	2,016	39.6	−4.7
Liberal Democrats	Ghazala Hayat	1,914	37.6	−4.6
Liberal Democrats	Kerry Williams	1,899	37.3	−7.2
Liberal Democrats	Suk-Ha Kwon	1,689	33.2	−5.3
Labour	Ian Kellett	501	9.9	+2.6
Labour	John Knowles	471	9.3	+3.5
Labour	George Pearson	441	8.7	+2.0
Green	Adeela Taimuri	261	5.1	N/A
Independent	Daniel Goodger	258	5.1	N/A
CPA	Roger Glencross	139	2.7	−1.4
Conservative hold		Swing		
Conservative hold		Swing		
Conservative gain from Liberal Democrats		Swing		

=== St James ===
St James (3)
Party	Candidate	Votes	%	±%
Conservative	Howard Jones*	2,008	44.7	−11.4
Conservative	Ken Smith*	1,948	43.3	−12.0
Conservative	Priyen Patel	1,679	37.4	−21.7
Liberal Democrats	Celia Osbourne	1,549	34.5	+7.5
Liberal Democrats	David Bamford	1,502	33.4	+7.8
Liberal Democrats	Chris Sullivan	1,280	28.5	+3.9
Labour	Gerry Jones	885	19.7	+9.2
Labour	Eric Master	516	11.5	+0.4
Labour	Mary Masters	513	11.4	+2.4
Green	Mike Perry	342	7.6	N/A
UKIP	Michael Watson	259	5.8	N/A
CPA	Eleanor Glencross	184	4.1	+0.5
Conservative hold		Swing		
Conservative hold		Swing		
Conservative hold		Swing		

=== St Mark's ===
St Mark's (3)
Party	Candidate	Votes	%	±%
Liberal Democrats	Liz Green*	2,612	51.1	−2.3
Liberal Democrats	Mary Heathcote	2,439	47.7	−4.0
Liberal Democrats	Yogan Yoganathan*	2,169	42.4	−8.8
Conservative	Paul Beal	1,846	36.1	+3.7
Conservative	Geoffrey Doyle	1,814	35.5	+3.7
Conservative	Deborah Patient	1,745	34.1	+3.0
Green	Satin Dattani	584	11.4	−2.9
Labour	Sandra Coombs	536	10.5	+4.2
Labour	James Lancaster	400	9.7	+3.7
Labour	Niranjan Jayasundera	371	7.3	+3.0
CPA	Keith Reynolds	100	2.0	−0.1
Liberal Democrats hold		Swing		
Liberal Democrats hold		Swing		
Liberal Democrats hold		Swing		

=== Surbiton Hill ===
Surbiton Hill (3)
Party	Candidate	Votes	%	±%
Liberal Democrats	Neil Houston	2,411	44.3	+12.9
Liberal Democrats	Malcolm Self	2,297	42.2	+12.8
Liberal Democrats	Umesh Parekh	2,183	40.1	+14.3
Conservative	Nick Kilby*	2,080	38.2	−13.4
Conservative	Mavis Cracknell	2,034	37.4	−13.9
Conservative	Paul Johnston*	1,948	35.8	−13.6
Labour	David Cooper	640	11.8	+2.5
Labour	Geoffrey Parnell	501	9.2	+1.2
Labour	Anne Vase	467	8.6	+0.7
Green	Brian Mulley	452	8.3	−6.2
CPA	Simon Groves	120	2.2	−1.0
CPA	Julian Orton	110	2.0	N/A
CPA	Silvina Bonansea-Ryan	93	1.7	N/A
Liberal Democrats gain from Conservative		Swing		
Liberal Democrats gain from Conservative		Swing		
Liberal Democrats gain from Conservative		Swing		

=== Tolworth & Hook Rise ===
Tolworth & Hook Rise (3)
Party	Candidate	Votes	%	±%
Liberal Democrats	Vicki Harris*	2,559	53.5	−5.7
Liberal Democrats	Rolson Davies*	2,510	52.5	−10.6
Liberal Democrats	Sharon Hartley	2,087	43.7	−13.5
Conservative	Judith Jones	1,399	29.3	+4.1
Conservative	Lucky Kumpeson	1,300	27.2	+2.2
Conservative	Rob Pattenden	1,220	25.5	+1.8
Labour	Mike Blakeney	622	13.0	+5.1
Labour	Brian Harris	528	11.0	+3.2
Labour	Marilyn Corry	495	10.4	+3.3
Green	Christopher Murphy	322	6.7	N/A
Independent	Vic Bellamy	300	6.3	N/A
CPA	Kenneth Scrimshaw	118	2.5	−1.2
CPA	Sharon Young	80	1.7	N/A
CPA	Joy Waugh	51	1.1	N/A
Liberal Democrats hold		Swing		
Liberal Democrats hold		Swing		
Liberal Democrats hold		Swing		

=== Tudor ===
Tudor (3)
Party	Candidate	Votes	%	±%
Conservative	David Cunningham*	2,731	52.2	−5.8
Conservative	Dennis Doe*	2,482	47.5	−6.0
Conservative	Frank Thompson*	2,328	44.5	−7.6
Liberal Democrats	Marilyn Mason	1,976	37.8	+10.9
Liberal Democrats	Rupert Nichol	1,661	31.8	+7.8
Liberal Democrats	Majeed Neky	1,563	29.9	+7.7
Green	Tariq Shabbeer	573	11.0	−7.7
Labour	Brian Morris	538	10.3	+2.0
Labour	James Smy	529	10.1	+0.1
Labour	Gabriel Abulafia	426	8.1	+2.0
Conservative hold		Swing		
Conservative hold		Swing		
Conservative hold		Swing		

== By-elections: 2010–2014 ==
A by-election was held in Surbiton Hill ward following the resignation of Umesh Parekh.

Surbiton Hill by-election, 15 September 2011
Party	Candidate	Votes	%	±%
Liberal Democrats	John Ayles	997	39.7	−2.6
Conservative	Nick Kilby	895	35.6	−0.9
Labour	Katie Hill	349	13.9	+2.7
CPA	Benjamin Roberts	171	6.8	+4.7
Green	Chris Walker	81	3.2	−4.7
Independent	James Riding	21	0.8	N/A
Majority		102	4.1	
Liberal Democrats hold		Swing		

A by-election was held for two seats in Coombe Vale ward following the death of James White and resignation of Robert-John Tasker.

Coombe Vale by-election, 15 December 2011
Party	Candidate	Votes	%	±%
Conservative	Lynne Finnerty	1,340	45.3	+2.3
Conservative	Julie Pickering	1,308	44.2	+1.2
Liberal Democrats	Kamal Kugan	908	30.7	−6.5
Liberal Democrats	Rupert Nichol	778	26.3	−10.9
Labour	Nick Brown	526	17.8	+7.9
Labour	Ian Parker	502	17.0	+7.1
Green	Chris Walker	122	4.1	−3.2
Green	Tariq Shabbeer	108	3.7	−3.6
CPA	Philippa Hayward	94	3.2	+0.5
CPA	Roger Glencross	76	2.6	−0.1
UKIP	Michael Watson	70	2.4	N/A
Majority		400	13.5	
Conservative hold		Swing		
Conservative hold		Swing		

A by-election was held in Coombe Hill ward following the resignation of David Edwards.

Coombe Hill by-election, 3 May 2012
Party	Candidate	Votes	%	±%
Conservative	Gajan Wallooppillai	1,601	53.8	+2.3
Labour	Laurie South	519	17.4	+6.5
Liberal Democrats	David Knowles	409	13.7	−13.9
Green	Jean Vidler	235	7.9	−0.3
UKIP	Michael Watson	148	5.0	N/A
CPA	Rajesh Dewan	66	2.2	+0.5
Majority		1,082	36.4	
Conservative hold		Swing		

A by-election was held in Grove ward following the resignation of Marc Woodall.

Grove by-election, 5 July 2012
Party	Candidate	Votes	%	±%
Liberal Democrats	Rebekah Moll	710	32.6	−12.2
Conservative	Adrian Amer	687	31.5	+4.8
Labour	Laurie South	440	20.2	+9.2
UKIP	Michael Watson	175	8.0	N/A
Green	Ryan Coley	123	5.6	−7.1
BNP	David Child	23	1.1	N/A
CPA	Jonathan Rudd	20	0.9	N/A
Majority		23	1.1	
Liberal Democrats hold		Swing		

A by-election was held in Berrylands ward following the death of Frances Moseley.

Berrylands by-election, 28 February 2013
Party	Candidate	Votes	%	±%
Liberal Democrats	Sushila Abraham	948	38.7	−4.7
Conservative	Mike Head	761	31.0	−5.0
Labour	Tony Banks	455	18.6	+9.2
UKIP	Michael Watson	175	7.1	N/A
Green	Ryan Coley	112	4.6	−4.8
Majority		187	7.7	
Liberal Democrats hold		Swing		

A by-election was held in Beverley ward following the resignation of Derek Osborne.

Beverley by-election, 25 July 2013
Party	Candidate	Votes	%	±%
Conservative	Terence Paton	1,033	35.1	+2.1
Liberal Democrats	Lesley Heap	760	25.9	−14.7
Labour	Marian Freedman	717	24.4	+11.9
UKIP	Michael Watson	223	7.6	N/A
Green	Chris Walker	207	7.0	−4.0
Majority		273	9.2	
Conservative gain from Liberal Democrats		Swing		
