= Tudor (Kingston upon Thames ward) =

- Electoral ward for the Kingston upon Thames London Borough Council
- Tudor ward boundaries since 2022
- Borough: Kingston upon Thames
- County: Greater London
- Population: 7,114 (2021) (Note: 2021 Census data reported for 2022 ward boundaries)
- Electorate: 5,188 (2022)
- Area: 1.981 square kilometres (0.765 sq mi)

Current electoral ward
- Created: 1965
- Number of members: 1965–1978: 2; 1978–2022: 3; 2022–present: 2
- Councillors: Patrick Hall; Jamal Chohan
- GSS code: E05013946

Tudor is an electoral ward in the Royal Borough of Kingston upon Thames. The ward was first used in the 1964 elections. It returns councillors to Kingston upon Thames London Borough Council.

== Kingston upon Thames council elections ==
There was a revision of ward boundaries in Kingston upon Thames in 2022.

=== 2022 election ===
The election took place on 5 May 2022.

2022 Kingston upon Thames London Borough Council election: Tudor
Party	Candidate	Votes	%	±%
Liberal Democrats	Patrick Hall	1,321	45.5	
Conservative	Jamal Chohan	1,167	40.2	
Conservative	Ben Mallett	1,153	39.7	
Liberal Democrats	Jack Smith	1,098	37.8	
Green	David Horgan	387	13.3	
Labour	Mark Stephen Garland	234	8.1	
Labour	Frank William Wingate	206	7.1	
Total votes		5,566		
Turnout		2,904	56.0	
Liberal Democrats win (new boundaries)				
Conservative win (new boundaries)				
