= Surbiton =

Neighbourhood of London, England

Coordinates: 51.394°N 0.307°W

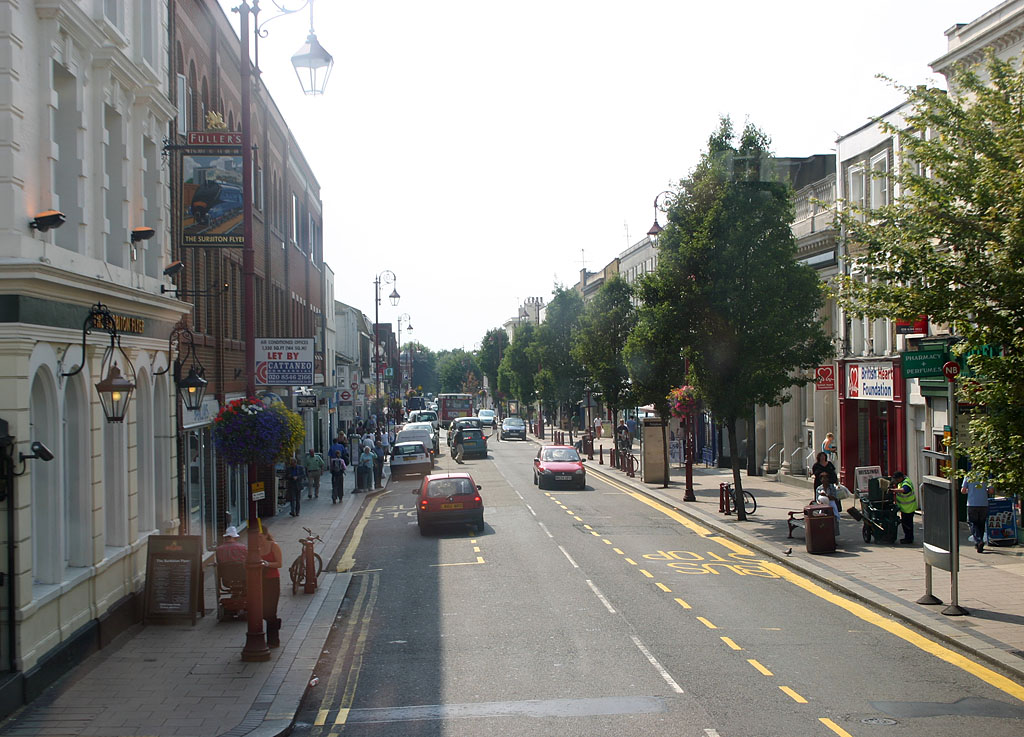
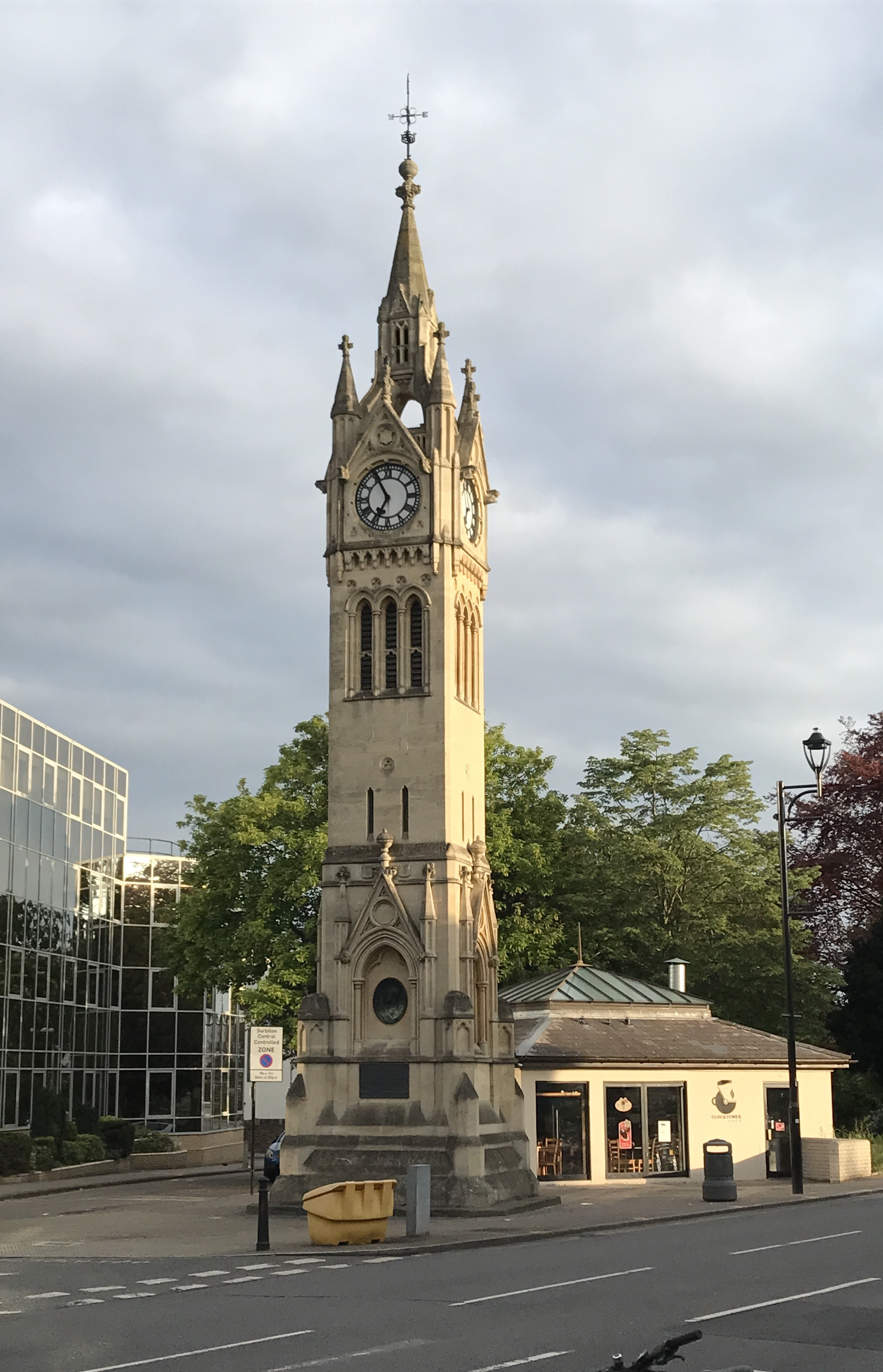
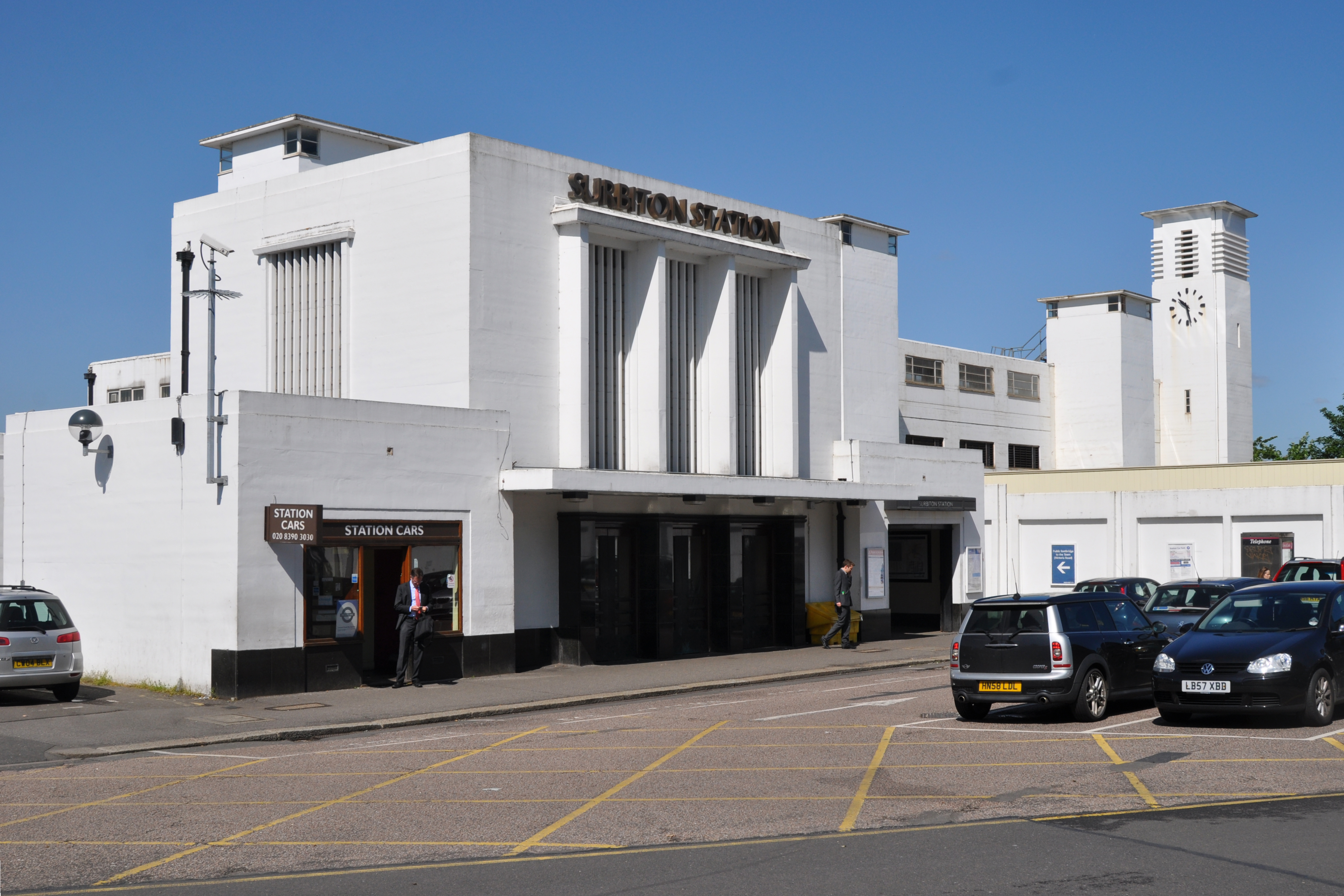
- Clockwise from top: Surbiton’s Main High Street; Coronation Clock Tower; Surbiton Railway Station; St Raphael’s and the River Thames with The Queen’s Promenade

- Location within Greater London
- Area: 7.18 km^{2} (2.77 sq mi)
- Population: 45,132
  - Density: 6,286/km^{2} (16,280/sq mi)
- OS grid reference: TQ180673
- London borough: Kingston
- Ceremonial county: Greater London
- Region: London
- Country: England
- Sovereign state: United Kingdom
- Post town: SURBITON
- Postcode district: KT5, KT6
- Dialling code: 020
- Police: Metropolitan
- Fire: London
- Ambulance: London
- UK Parliament: Kingston and Surbiton
- London Assembly: South West

Surbiton is a suburban neighbourhood in South West London, within the Royal Borough of Kingston upon Thames (RBK). It is next to the River Thames, 11 miles (18 km) southwest of Charing Cross. Surbiton was in the historic county of Surrey and since 1965 it has been in Greater London. Surbiton comprises five of the RBK's wards: Alexandra, Berrylands, St. Mark's, Surbiton Hill, and Tolworth.

Founded originally as Kingston-upon-Railway when the area was first developed in the 1840s, Surbiton possesses a mixture of grand 19th-century townhouses, Art Deco courts, and more recent residential blocks blending in with semi-detached 20th-century housing estates. With a population of 45,132 in 2016, it accounts for approximately 25% of the total population of the Royal Borough of Kingston upon Thames. Surbiton extends over an area of 7.18 km^{2} (2.77 mi^{2}).

== Etymology ==
The name is attested as Suberton in 1179, Surbeton in 1263, Surpeton in 1486, and finally Surbiton 1597. Sūth Bere-tūn means "southern grange" or "outlying farm" in Old English, as opposed to nearby Norbiton; both Norbiton and Surbiton were possessions of the royal manor of Kingston.

== History ==
=== Early history ===
A postcard showing Surbiton Railway Station c.1910 prior to its redevelopment

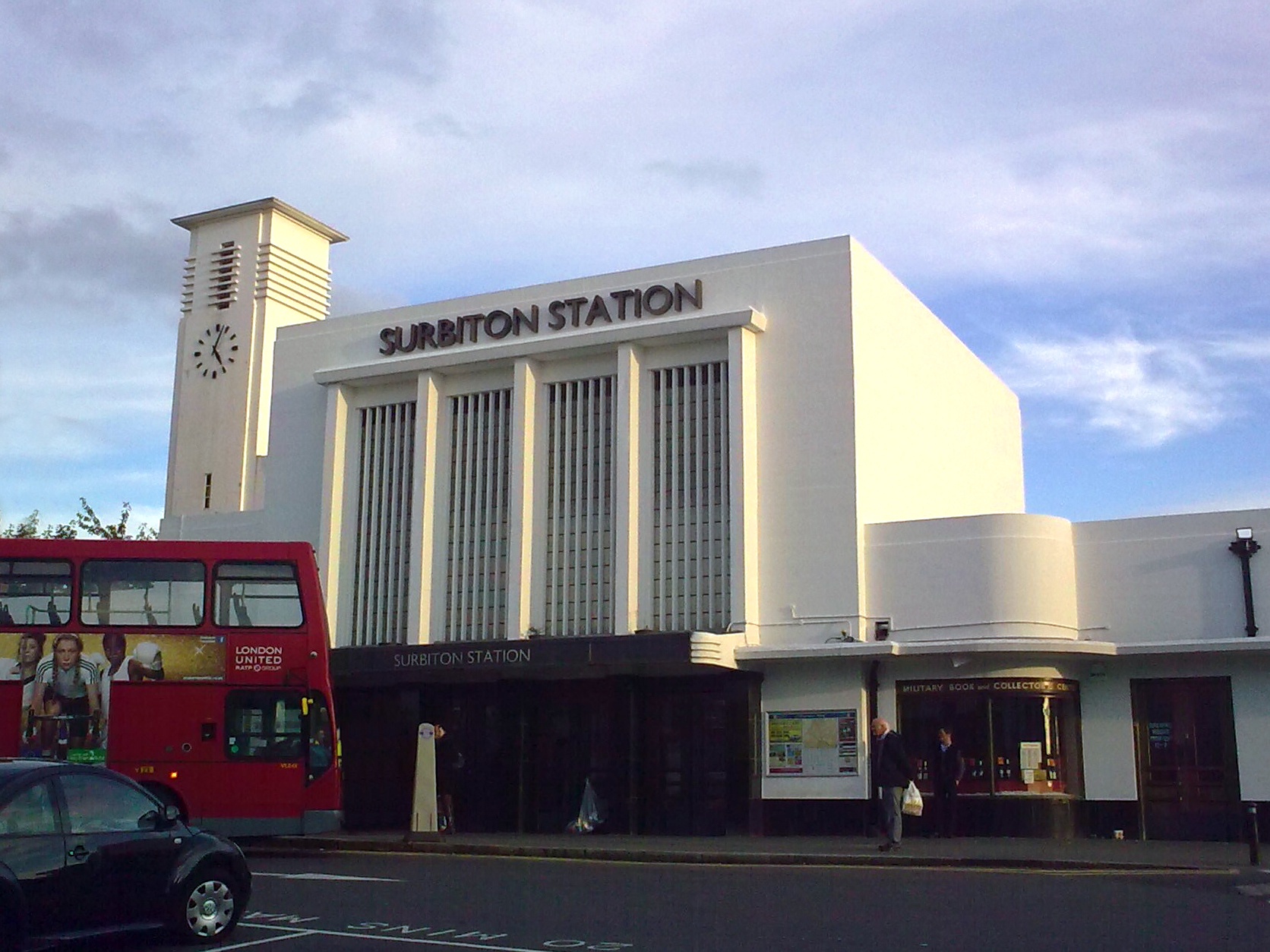
Grade-II listed Surbiton railway station today with its art deco façade

The early history of Surbiton is scant, however in 1648 Surbiton Hill was the scene of one of the last battles of the Second English Civil War. This later became known as The Battle of Surbiton and was fought on what was once Surbiton Common, about a mile to the east of the modern day railway station. This northerly part of Berrylands is still known as Surbiton Hill.

Prior to the major development we see today, Surbiton was very much a semi-rural location on the bank of the River Thames, well away from the outermost boundary of London. Eighteenth century maps show much of area laid to farmland with a few large properties owning many acres of land between them. One such property being Southborough Park which occupied most of the land on the south-west of Surbiton, extending almost from Hook Road to the Thames. A grade II-listed mansion called Southborough House still stands on Ashcombe Avenue at what was once the centre of this expansive property and gives its name to the area known as ‘Southborough’. The current building was designed in 1808 by John Nash.

Another of the substantial early properties was Surbiton House (known at different times as Surbiton Place and Surbiton Hall) and its parkland Surbiton Park. It was built for William Roffee, a wealthy distiller, at the south-eastern end of Surbiton Street, now known as Surbiton Road. When Roffee died in 1785, Surbiton Place was bought by Thomas Fassett, who extended both the house and the grounds. Fassett sold the house to Henry Paget, Earl of Uxbridge. His son, also Henry Paget, inherited it in 1812 and distinguished himself at Waterloo. Not long after the battle, he became the first Marquess of Anglesey. The two roads leading down to the river at Surbiton near the location of Surbiton House, named Uxbridge Road and Anglesea Road, refer to this historical property. A stone tablet exists on the boundary wall of 82 Surbiton Road from the original estate.

=== The arrival of the railway ===
A deep cutting was excavated to facilitate the railway. Shown here in 1965.

The present-day town came into existence after a plan to build a London-Southampton railway line through nearby Kingston was rejected by Kingston Council, who feared that it would be detrimental to the coaching trade. This resulted in the line being routed further south, through a cutting in the hill south of Surbiton. Surbiton railway station opened in 1838, and was originally named Kingston-upon-Railway. It was renamed Surbiton to distinguish it from the new Kingston railway station on the Shepperton branch line, which opened on 1 January 1869.

As a result, Kingston is now on a branch line, whereas passengers from Surbiton (smaller in comparison) can reach London Waterloo in as little as 16 minutes on a fast direct service; as well as places further afield, including Portsmouth and Southampton.

The present station, rebuilt in 1937, was designed by James Robb Scott in a mixture of art deco and modernist architectural style. The original hand-drawn large format architectural drawings from the 1937 reconstruction are privately held in a Surbiton collection.

=== Queen’s Promenade ===
Queen's Promenade with Raven’s Ait in the background, seen here c.1910

One of Surbiton’s notable features is the town’s proximity to the River Thames which has determined its westerly boundary and also shaped some of the leisure activities of the townspeople.

Seeing the opportunity for a raised walkway along the Thames at Surbiton, work begun on a new promenade in 1852 and was completed by 1854. After initial neglect, increasing popularity meant the promenade was restored and significantly widened in the late 1850s.

The site of the old bandstand looking upstream towards Raven’s Ait

Between 1893 and 1910 the promenade had its own bandstand; a gift of Rufus Martin Boniwell, a Surbiton auctioneer and estate agent, band concerts were funded out of the rates by the Corporation of Kingston upon Thames. The bandstand has long been demolished but the foundations of the original structure are still observable along the promenade between Palace Road and Anglesea Road.

The River Thames and Queen's Promenade looking towards Kingston Bridge

Although initially petering out close to St Raphael’s church, in 1896 the hard standing was extended north towards Kingston. During World War II an ARP air raid warden was stationed on Portsmouth Road close to the junction with Uxbridge Road at the Raven’s Ait end of the promenade. The brick built hut along the promenade where the warden was stationed still stands today and is now used by the volunteer community group Queen’s Promenade Friends in their ‘Pocket Park’.

The present day promenade stretches for 1km and sweeps in a gentle arc between Raven’s Ait in Surbiton and terminates in Kingston upon Thames where it merges with the riverside walk which continues towards Kingston Bridge. The promenade has created a safe pedestrianised route between Surbiton and Kingston and has long been a popular destination for walkers, runners and those seeking a scenic route back and forth between the two towns.

=== World War II to the present day ===
Surbiton War Memorial

Due to its proximity to London and the centres for aircraft manufacture in Kingston, Surbiton sustained pockets of bomb damage from German aerial attacks.

On 2nd October 1940, St Mark’s Church suffered a direct hit which destroyed the roof, most of the original stained glass and gutted the internal structure. Despite the severe damage, the spire remained standing. Due to its position at the top of St Mark’s Hill, it was reported that residents who were there that day could see the fire across the town. A cairn was erected in the Surbiton war memorial gardens using rubble from the damaged St Mark’s church to commemorate the event.

Surbiton war memorial was unveiled in July 1921 to commemorate 382 servicemen from the borough who died in the First World War and an inscription was added after the Second World War, which does not list the individual names of those lost.

Lieutenant H Aldridge of Surbiton Hill reads a letter from home, January 1944. Imperial War Museum Collection.

== Politics ==
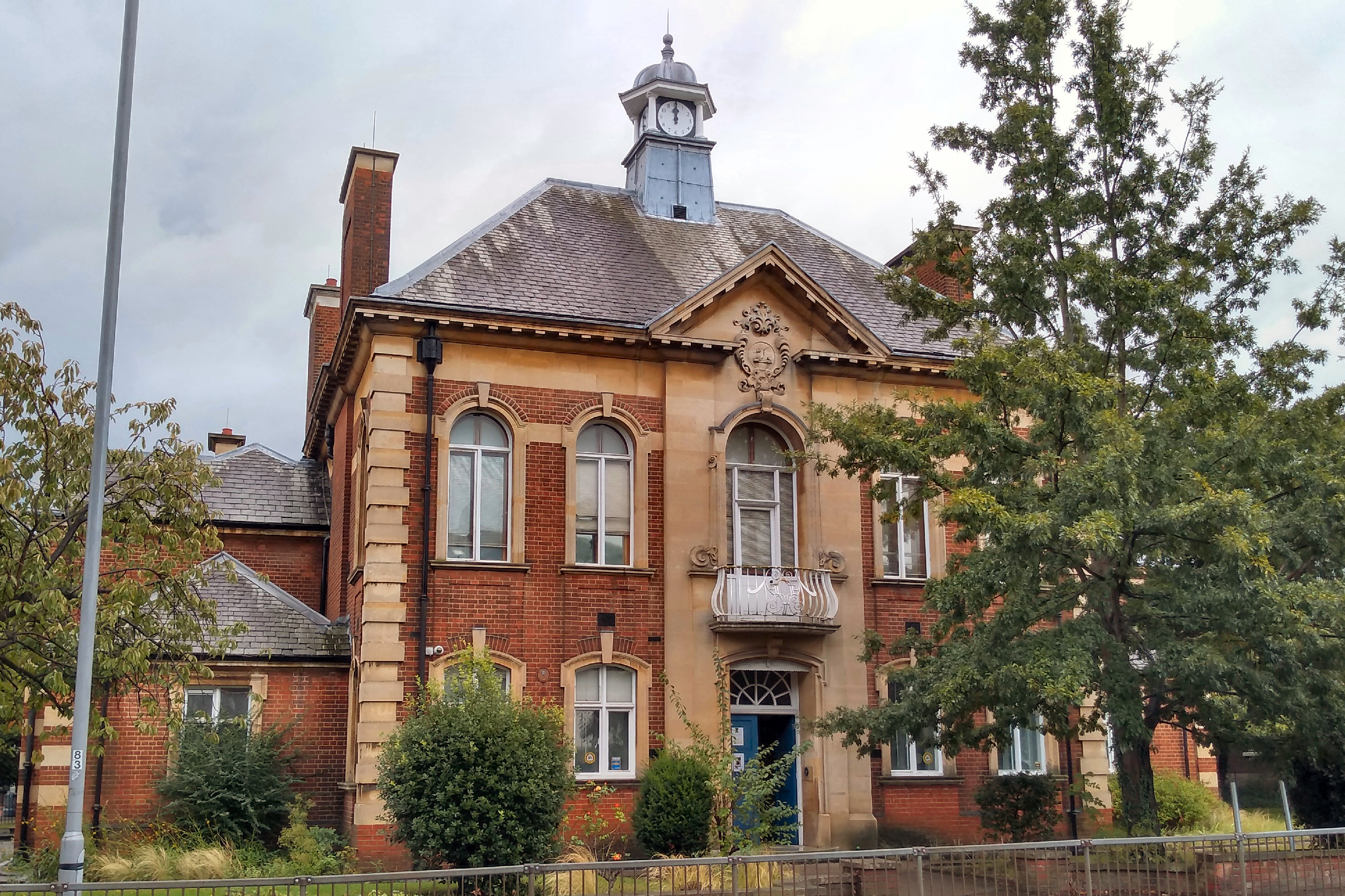

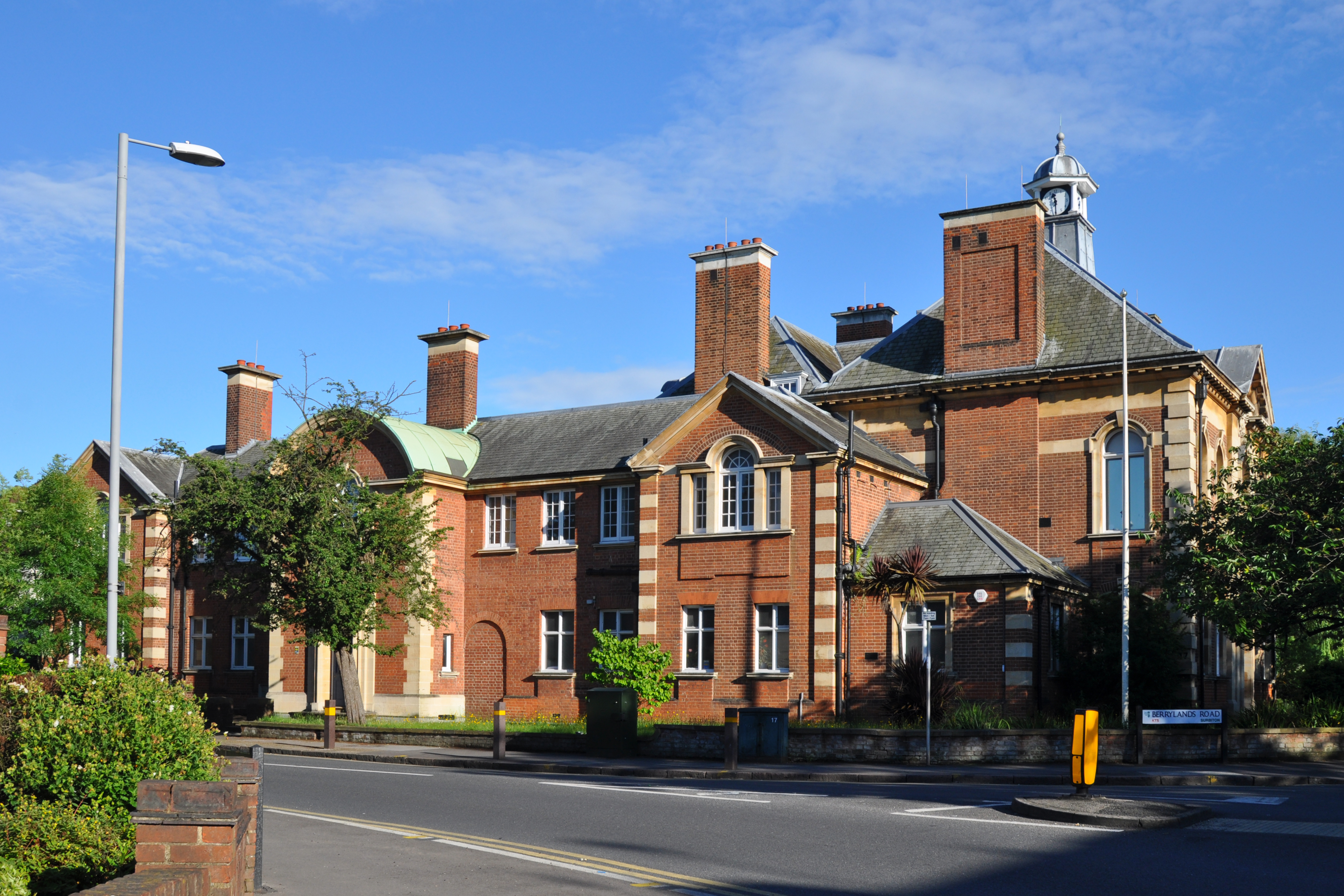
Sessions House housed the Municipal Borough of Surbiton before Surbiton became part of Greater London in 1965.

Location map of Surbiton within the Royal Borough of Kingston upon Thames and Greater London

=== National politics ===
Surbiton falls within the UK parliamentary constituency of Kingston and Surbiton, which is represented in the House of Commons by Sir Ed Davey, currently the leader of the Liberal Democrats who served as Secretary of State for Energy and Climate Change during the Conservative–Liberal Democrat coalition. Davey also represented the constituency between 1997 and 2015, having been ousted for a short period of time by Conservative James Berry. In the 2017 general election, Davey went on to defeat Berry by 45% to 38%. Both Davey's and Berry's offices were located in Surbiton's Berrylands ward.

In the 2016 United Kingdom European Union membership referendum, Kingston and Surbiton voted to remain a member of the European Union by 61.7% of the local vote.

=== London politics ===
Surbiton is represented in the London Assembly by Liberal Democrat politician Gareth Roberts, as part of Greater London's South West constituency.

=== Local councillors ===
Surbiton elects 12 of the Kingston upon Thames London Borough Council's 48 councillors. The wards in Surbiton are Alexandra, Berrylands, St Mark's and Seething Wells, Surbiton Hill and Tolworth. As of the 2018 local elections, the council is controlled by the Liberal Democrats, and all Surbiton's elected councillors are members of that party.

2018 result: Councillors from Surbiton's four Kingston Council wards
Party	Councillors (12)	Change
Liberal Democrats	12 / 12 (100%)	▲5
Conservatives	0 / 12 (0%)	▼5

== Transport ==
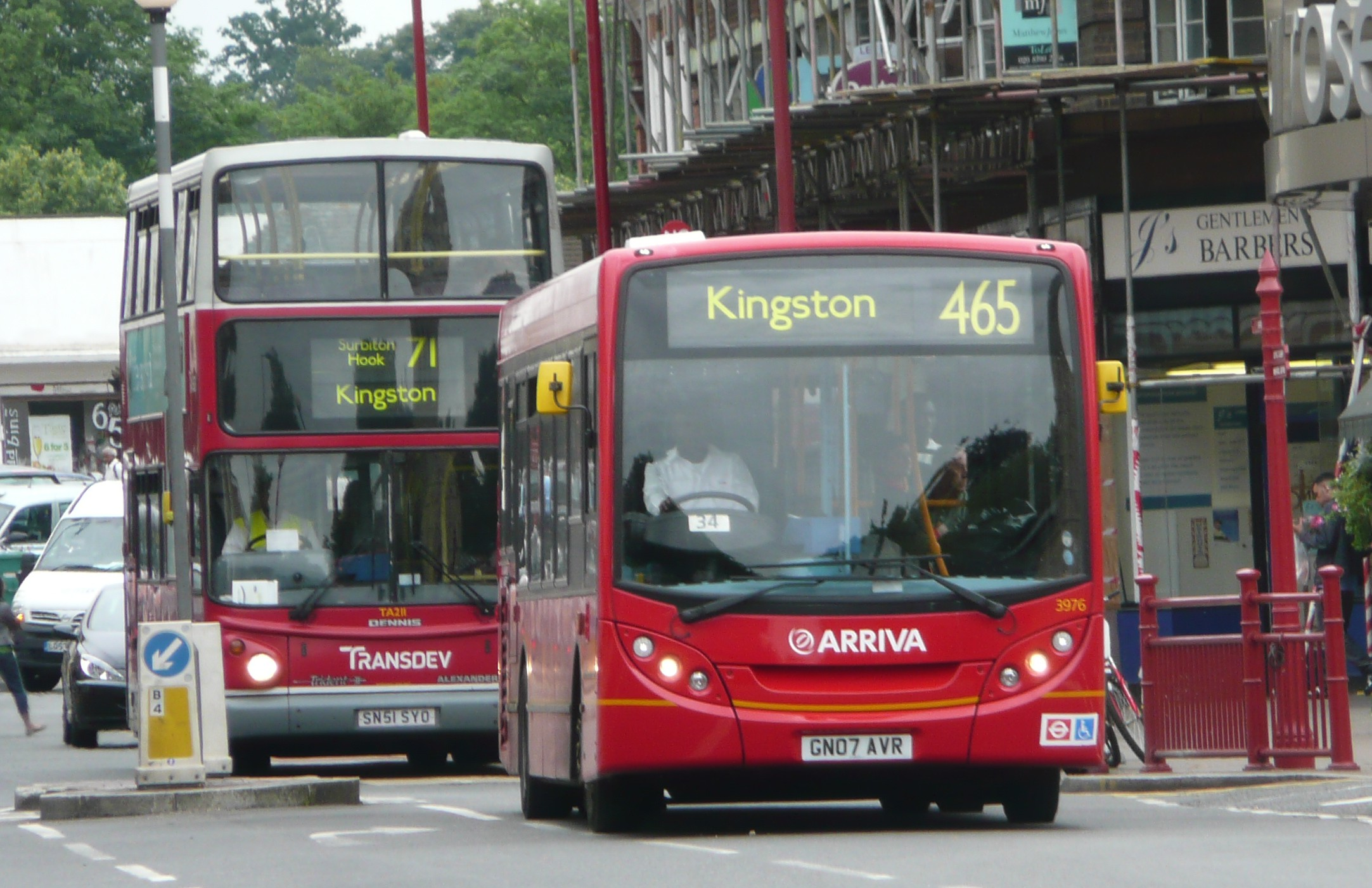
A London double-decker bus and an Abellio Surrey bus in Surbiton

Surbiton is served by a number of regular bus services. Transport for London bus routes 71, 281, 406, 418, 465, K1, K2, K3, and K4, as well as Hallmark Connections route 458, Reptons Coaches route 513, Falcon Buses routes 514, 515 and 715 all serve the area. These provide links to Chessington, Kingston town centre, Twickenham, Hounslow, Epsom, Leatherhead, Dorking, Cobham, Staines, Weybridge and Guildford.

Surbiton is also close to two of London's largest airports: Heathrow and Gatwick.

Railways have served the town since it was founded. Surbiton and Berrylands stations are both served by South Western Railway services. It provides rail links to London Waterloo, Surrey and Hampshire.

If approval is granted for the project, Surbiton will be connected with the London Underground system via Crossrail 2. It is expected that the project will relieve pressure on both Surbiton and Berrylands stations.

Surbiton lacks major motorways, although the A3 road cuts through Berrylands ward at Tolworth Underpass. Parts of the A307 that run along the River Thames, Portsmouth Road, have become part of the London cycle routes network.

== Education ==
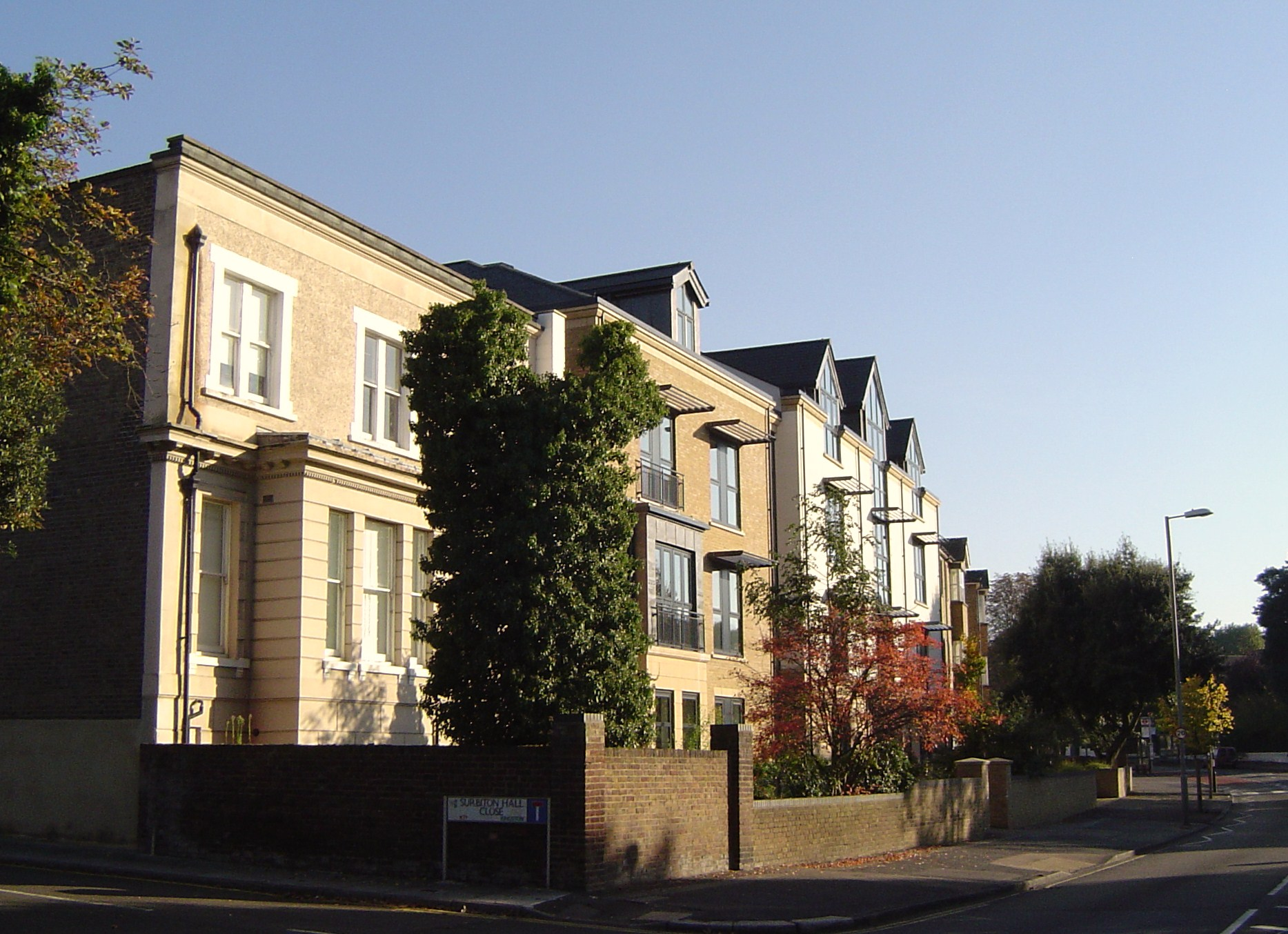
Surbiton High School.

== Demographics ==
=== Religion ===
The interior of St Andrew’s Church, Surbiton.

Until the early 19th century, Surbiton, like Norbiton, lay in the parish of All Saints, Kingston upon Thames. As a result, Surbiton's two town centre parish churches, Saint Mark's and Saint Andrew's, date back only to the Victorian era.

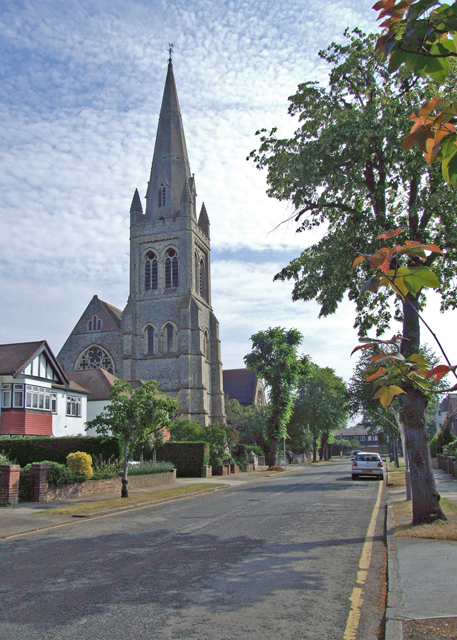
St Matthew's, Surbiton

There are two further Anglican parish churches in south Surbiton, Christ Church and Saint Matthew's, both also Victorian.

Christ Church was built in 1862–63, by Charles Lock Luck and lengthened in 1866. The chancel aisles were added in 1864, and 1871. It has no tower, and is built of red brick with stone dressings with some black brick voussoirs. The east stained-glass window was done by Clayton and Bell, the central stained-glass window by Burne-Jones, while the other stained glass was done by Lavers, Barraud and Westlake.

Saint Matthew's was completed in 1875, having taken less than 2 years to build. The church and the original vicarage were paid for by one man, William Matthew Coulthurst, who was the senior partner of Coutts Bank. On the outside of the east end of the church, there is a stone plaque recording this and the fact that it was partly built in memory of Hannah Mabella Coulthurst, the dead sister of William Matthew Coulthurst. Built into the wall behind the plaque, there is a photograph of Hannah, a copy of 'The Times' newspaper of the day and a letter from William Coulthurst stipulating that the church should remain in the evangelical tradition. The church and vicarage cost £26,500. The old vicarage was pulled down in 1939 and a subsequent one was built on the same plot. In 2012, work started on a new vicarage on part of the plot and this was completed in 2013. The East stained-glass window by Henry Holiday was destroyed by a V-1 flying bomb on 23 June 1944. They were replaced in 1953 with windows by Hugh Easton, with his maker's mark of a weather vane signed H Easton with a cockerel on the top. The Clayton memorial triptych window was installed in 1921, designed by Louis Davis, 'the last of the Pre-Raphaelites', and made by Thomas Cowall (1870–1949) for James Powell and Sons. The Caporn memorial window was installed in 1970 and designed by W. T. Carter Shapland who had also designed the West window at St Mark's. Some of the original windows by Powell & Sons survive, known as Quarry windows because they are made up of pre-stamped diamond-shaped glass known as 'Quarries'.

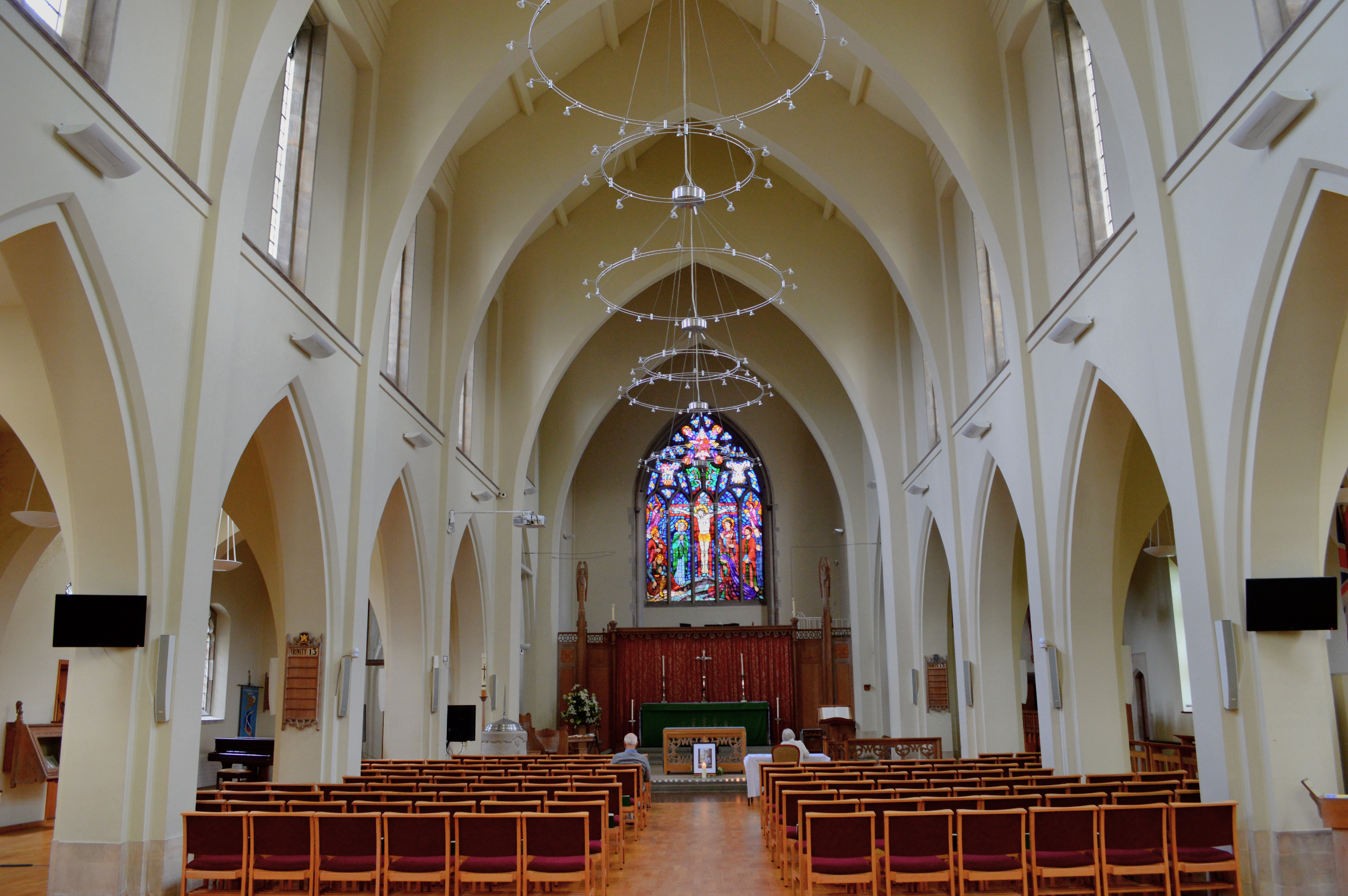
St Mark's Church, chancel.

Other churches in Surbiton include Surbiton Hill Methodist Church on Ewell Road, opened in 1882, and the Roman Catholic church of Saint Raphael's, completed in 1848 and located to the north of Surbiton, in the Kingston upon Thames postal district.

In recent years, Surbiton has become more diverse in terms of religion, the Surbiton area having a Sikh Gurdwara and an Orthodox Jewish synagogue. According to the 2011 Census, Muslims form the largest minority religious community at about 5% of the population; the nearest mosque is located in Kingston upon Thames.

=== Nationality ===
Approximately 74% of Surbiton's residents at the 2011 Census were born in the United Kingdom (73% in Alexandra, 71% in St. Mark's, 75% in Surbiton Hill, 76% in Berrylands). The largest ethnic group, with two-thirds of the population, is "White British", with "White Other" the second largest group at just under 10%.

== Sport ==
Violette Lermitte at Surbiton in May 1926

Surbiton Lawn Tennis Club hosted international tennis from 1900 (Surrey Grass Court Championships – SGCC) until 1981 at the tennis Club in Berrylands. From 1998 to 2008 international tennis returned to Surbiton with an event hosted by the Lawn Tennis Association (LTA) and Surbiton Racket & Fitness Club (SRFC). The Surbiton Trophy was part of the ATP Challenger Series and in 2009 the event was moved to Nottingham as part of a reorganisation by the LTA. The event came back to SRFC in 2015 and continues to be played at Berrylands.

Surbiton F.C. was a short-lived football club founded in 1862 by members of Kingston Rowing Club and counted itself among the founders of The Football Association in 1863. Surbiton is the current home of both male and female football teams, Darkside FC and Surbiton Wanderers; along with the now defunct Surbiton Town Ladies FC. Non-competitive female football teams include Kingston & Surbiton Swans and Gals FC.

Established in 1874, Surbiton Hockey Club has proven to be one of the best hockey clubs in the country, regularly producing players of international quality. Its men's and ladies' 1st XIs currently both play in their respective national premier leagues, while its youth section are the best-represented club in England Hockey’s 2026/27 age-group squads. Ex-club member Sophie Bray took gold at the 2016 Summer Olympics in Rio de Janeiro for Team GB.

Surbiton is also the home to Surbiton Croquet Club, which is amongst the strongest croquet clubs in the world, claiming multiple world championship titles and having dominated the 2025 World Championships in Florida. Boasting seven lawns, the club is London’s largest croquet venue and one of the biggest nationally.

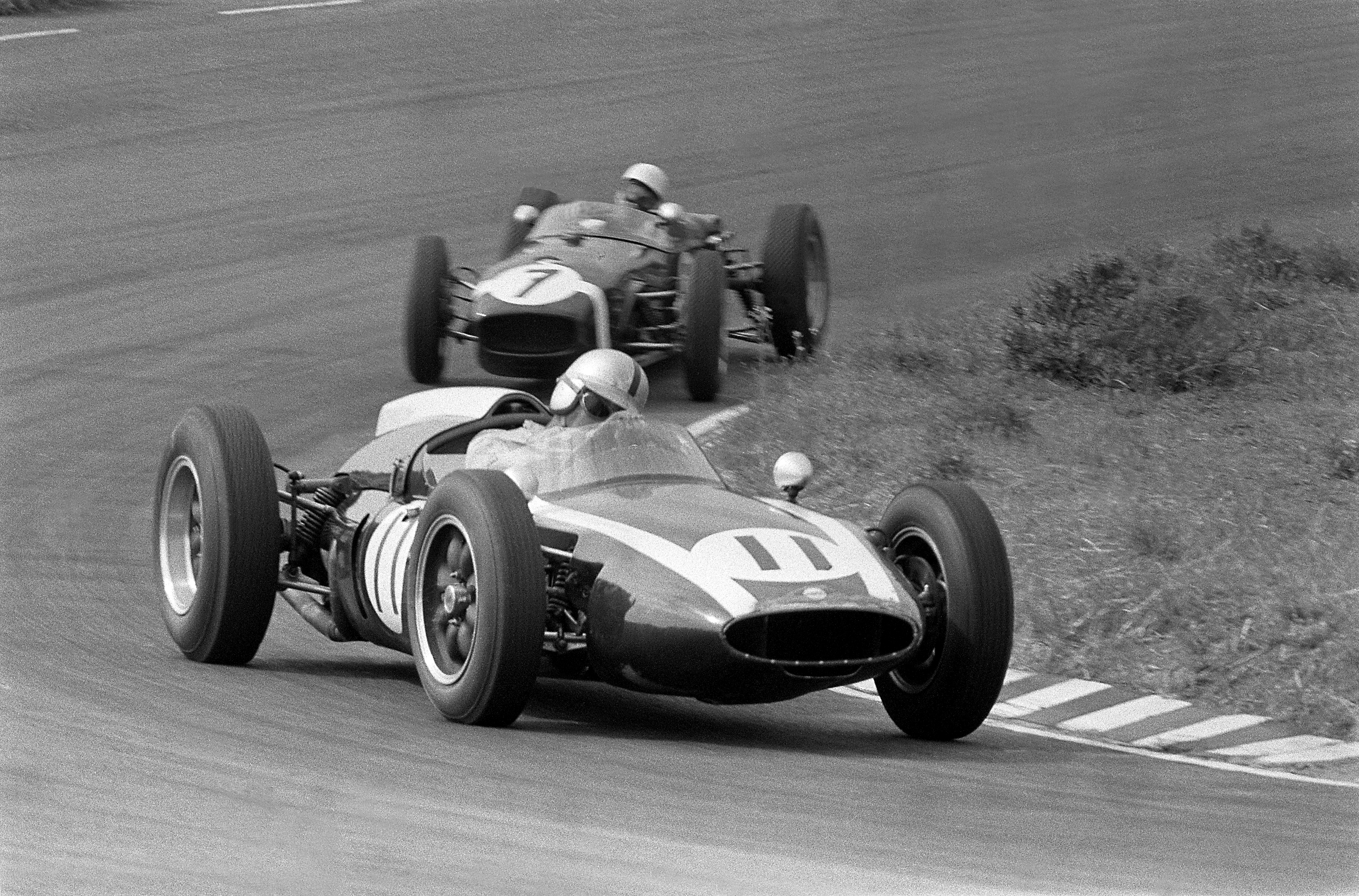
Jack Brabham in the Cooper T53 at the 1960 Dutch Grand Prix.

Motorsport in Surbiton lays claim to one of the sports highest accolades. As early as the 1920s, Charles Cooper ran a garage from row of sheds on a plot he purchased on Hollyfield Road, with his son John the business later operated from a purpose built facility on the site which was completed in 1958. The Cooper Car Company was based here from 1946 to 1968 and the company went on to claim the Formula One Constructors Championships in 1959 and 1960 and develop the iconic Mini Cooper in 1961. The old Cooper works are now occupied by Porsche specialists Charles Ivey.

Surbiton has a strong historical connection to cycling. The town’s stretch along the River Thames was used as part of the route of both the road race and time trials at the 2012 Olympic Games and the town hosts thousands of amateur riders who take part in the annual Ride London-Surrey 100, following the Olympic route. One notable resident, Eileen Gray was an international bicycle racer who founded the Women's Cycle Racing Association, was president of the British Cycling Federation and became one of the initial inductees into the British Cycling Hall of Fame, further cementing Surbiton’s ties to the sport.

== Popular culture and notable residents ==
=== Resident artists and writers ===
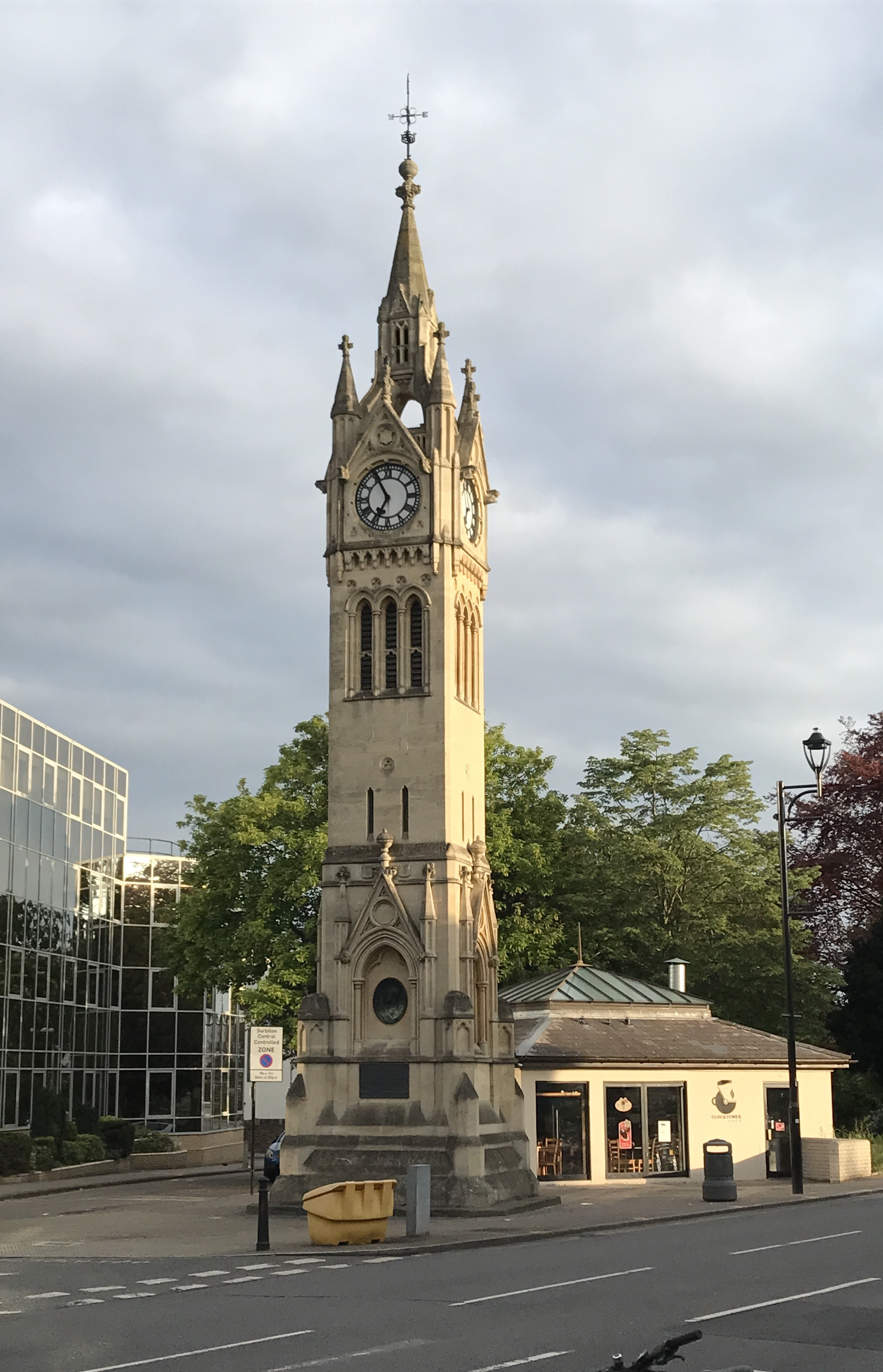
The clock tower, Surbiton, built to celebrate the Coronation of King Edward VII, 1902

The Pre-Raphaelite painters John Everett Millais (1829–1896) and William Holman Hunt (1827–1910) came to Surbiton in 1851, 26 years before Richard Jefferies (1848–1887). Millais used the Hogsmill River, in Six Acre Meadow, Tolworth, as the background for his painting Ophelia. Holman Hunt used the fields just south of this spot as the background to The Hireling Shepherd.

In the mid-1870s the novelist Thomas Hardy (1840–1928) lived in a house called 'St. David's Villa' in Hook Road, Surbiton, for a year after his marriage to Emma Gifford. H. G. Wells, in his comic novel The Wheels of Chance, describes the cycle collision of 'Mr Hoopdriver' and a 'Young Lady in Grey'; the young lady approaching 'along an affluent from the villas of Surbiton'. The writer Enid Blyton was governess to a Surbiton family for four years from 1920, at a house called 'Southernhay', also on the Hook Road. C. H. Middleton (1886–1945), who broadcast on gardening during the Second World War, lived in Surbiton, where he died suddenly outside his home. The artist who brought Rupert the Bear to life for a whole generation, Alfred Bestall, sketched out his cartoons from his home in Cranes Park, Surbiton Hill.

=== RMS Titanic ===
Surbiton was home to at least one soul lost on the ill fated maiden voyage of Titanic. Austin Partner was living at the time of the disaster at "The Briars", 352 Ewell Road, Tolworth and was travelling in first class accommodation aboard the White Star Line vessel. His body was recovered by the Mackay-Bennett and transferred to New York. On 11th May 1912, 26 days after the sinking, his body was taken aboard SS Minnehaha and after being repatriated was laid to rest at St. Mary's Churchyard, Long Ditton. His widow Nellie never remarried, remaining at the Briars for the rest of her life; passing away in hospital on 13 July 1957 and was buried with her husband. Their home on Ewell Road remains in the family over 100 years later.

=== In popular culture ===
Surbiton was once home to Surbiton Studios which were owned by Stoll Pictures, before the company shifted its main production to Cricklewood Studios.

Surbiton was the setting of Keble Howard's novel The Smiths of Surbiton, published in 1906. The novel proved successful and led to two sequels, The Smiths of Valley View (1909) and The Smiths in War-Time (1918), both also set in Surbiton.

A 1972 episode of Monty Python's Flying Circus featured a mock documentary which investigated whether the residents of Hounslow, another London area suburb, had long ago been descendants of the people of Surbiton "who had made the great trek north".

Surbiton is popularly remembered as an icon of suburbia in such British television programmes as The Good Life (starring Richard Briers, Penelope Keith, Paul Eddington and Felicity Kendal), though location filming took place in Northwood, North-West London, and John Sessions and Phil Cornwell's comedy series Stella Street.

Platform 3 at Surbiton Station where Dumbledore collects Harry Potter in the film.

Surbiton station features in the 2009 film version of Harry Potter and the Half-Blood Prince, with actors Daniel Radcliffe as Harry Potter and Michael Gambon as Albus Dumbledore. Filming took place in November 2007. The station also appears in Agatha Christie's Poirot: The Adventure of the Clapham Cook, a 1989 ITV adaptation of the short story by Agatha Christie. The station reflects the 1930s Art Deco style that often featured in locations used in the series.

The guitarist and singer-songwriter Eric Clapton purchased one of his first guitars from a shop in Surbiton called Bells; the shop has since closed.

The external shots of the flat owned by the fictional character Gary Strang, played by Martin Clunes in Men Behaving Badly were filmed at 2 Ellerton Road, Surbiton.

Stella Street is a British television comedy programme, originally screened in four series on BBC Two between 1997 and 2001 and later adapted into a film. The production follows the premise that a group of British and American celebrities have all decided to move into fictional ’Stella Street’ in Surbiton (actually Hartswood Road, London, W12).

=== List of notable residents ===
- Marjorie Abbatt – toy-maker and businesswoman
- Tony Arbour - educated at Surbiton County Grammar School.
- Thomas John Barnardo – Irish philanthropist and founder of Barnardo's charity.
- Mike Batt – Singer, songwriter, musician, known for The Wombles
- Douglas Walter Belcher VC – recipient of the Victoria Cross for action in the 2nd Battle of Ypres during WWI.
- George Best – a retired footballer and TV pundit before his death (having been born in Belfast and lived much of his life in Manchester)
- Alfred Bestall – illustrator of the Rupert books
- Enid Blyton – English children's writer
- Charlie Brooks – actress
- William Bryant – co-founder of Bryant and May's matches, lived with his wife at their property 'Oakenshaw' in Surbiton
- Wilberforce Bryant – chairman of Bryant and May's matches, eldest son of co-founder William Bryant, lived at 'The Gables' (now Hillcroft College)
- Charles Burney – Archdeacon of Kingston-upon-Thames from 1879 to 1904
- Arthur Brian Burton, founder and owner of Thames Ditton Foundry
- Jane Campbell, Baroness Campbell of Surbiton – equality and human rights champion
- Rosalbina Caradori-Allan – opera singer
- Frank Cellier – actor
- Julian Clary – comedian and novelist
- William Francis Dundonald Cochrane – brigadier-general in the Army, and great-grandson of Archibald Cochrane, 9th Earl of Dundonald
- Finn Cole - actor, attended Hollyfield Secondary School in Surbiton.
- Joe Cole - actor, attended Hollyfield Secondary School in Surbiton.
- John Cooper – car maker
- Allan Cuthbertson – actor
- Ed Davey MP – politician, leader of the Liberal Democrats
- Phyllis Dixey – singer, dancer and impresario
- Chris Dreja - rhythm guitarist and bassist for the rock band The Yardbirds.
- Bernard George Ellis – winner of the George Cross
- David Essex – musician, singer-songwriter and actor, lived on Ditton Road for 16 years until 2002.
- John Foxx – musician and digital artist, former resident
- Susan George – actress
- Gloria Granville – mother of actor Paul Rudd
- Eileen Gray – cyclist

15 Hook Road, home of Thomas Hardy.

- Thomas Hardy – author (while completing and for the publishing of Far from the Madding Crowd)
- Roy Hodgson – football manager
- Saskia Howard-Clarke – Big Brother contestant and glamour model
- Leslie Illsley – artist and one of the founders of Troika Pottery
- James Johnston – rugby union player, lived in Surbiton until 2013 while playing for Harlequins
- Lukin Johnston – English-Canadian journalist who interviewed Adolf Hitler and subsequently disappeared
- John Keen – racing cyclist
- Mollie King - singer with the Saturdays and BBC Radio 1 presenter, attended Surbiton High School.
- Norman Lee – British screenwriter and film director
- Rob Lee – former councillor
- Lara Lewington – television presenter, attended Surbiton High School
- Chris McCausland – comedian, Would I Lie To You?, Live at the Apollo
- John McCririck – horse racing pundit, Celebrity Big Brother (2005), and Ultimate Big Brother (2010)
- Debbie McGee – widow of late magician Paul Daniels, born in Kingston, lived in Tolworth, went to Our Lady Immaculate and Tolworth Girls' Schools
- Art Malik – actor
- Dudley Mason GC – master of the SS Ohio
- C. H. Middleton ("Mr Middleton") – gardener, writer and BBC broadcaster
- Nicky Morgan, Baroness Morgan of Cotes - grew up in Surbiton and was educated at Surbiton High School.
- William Newton – Olympic sports shooter, killed in World War I, grew up in Surbiton where his parents settled.
- Elizabeth Norton – historian and author
- Betty Nuthall – amongst other major titles, winner of the 1930 Women's US Singles Tennis Championship, ranked number 4 in the world
- Katherine Parkinson – actress, IT Crowd
- Andy Parsons – comedian, Mock The Week
- Alf Pearson (of musical double act Bob and Alf Pearson) lived in Surbiton until 2007
- Emma, Lady Radford – English antiquarian and public servant, incl. chairman of the Kingston-upon-Thames Women's Land Army. Resided at Chiswick House, Ditton Hill, Surbiton.
- Jon Richardson – comedian, 8 out of 10 Cats, Stand Up for the Week
- L. J. K. Setright – motoring journalist and author
- Helen Sharman – first Briton in space, first woman to visit Mir space station
- David Spinx – actor
- Twinkle (Lynn Ripley) – singer
- Naunton Wayne – actor
- Jimmy White – Snooker Player
- Joe Wicks – Coach and personal trainer
- Dorothy Wrinch – first woman to receive an Oxford DSc., 1938 Nobel Prize nominee, grew up in Surbiton

== Geography ==
Seething Wells from the opposite bank of the River Thames.

The terrain of Surbiton is relatively flat, except for a small hill near its centre. It is part of the Royal Borough of Kingston upon Thames in Greater London, and borders the Borough of Elmbridge in Surrey. Surbiton consists of several smaller areas, including much of Seething Wells.

=== Nearby areas ===
Surbiton is a post town in the KT postcode area, consisting of the KT5 and KT6 postcode districts. KT5 includes Berrylands, Tolworth and part of Surbiton; and KT6 includes Tolworth, Long Ditton and part of Surbiton.

== Gallery ==
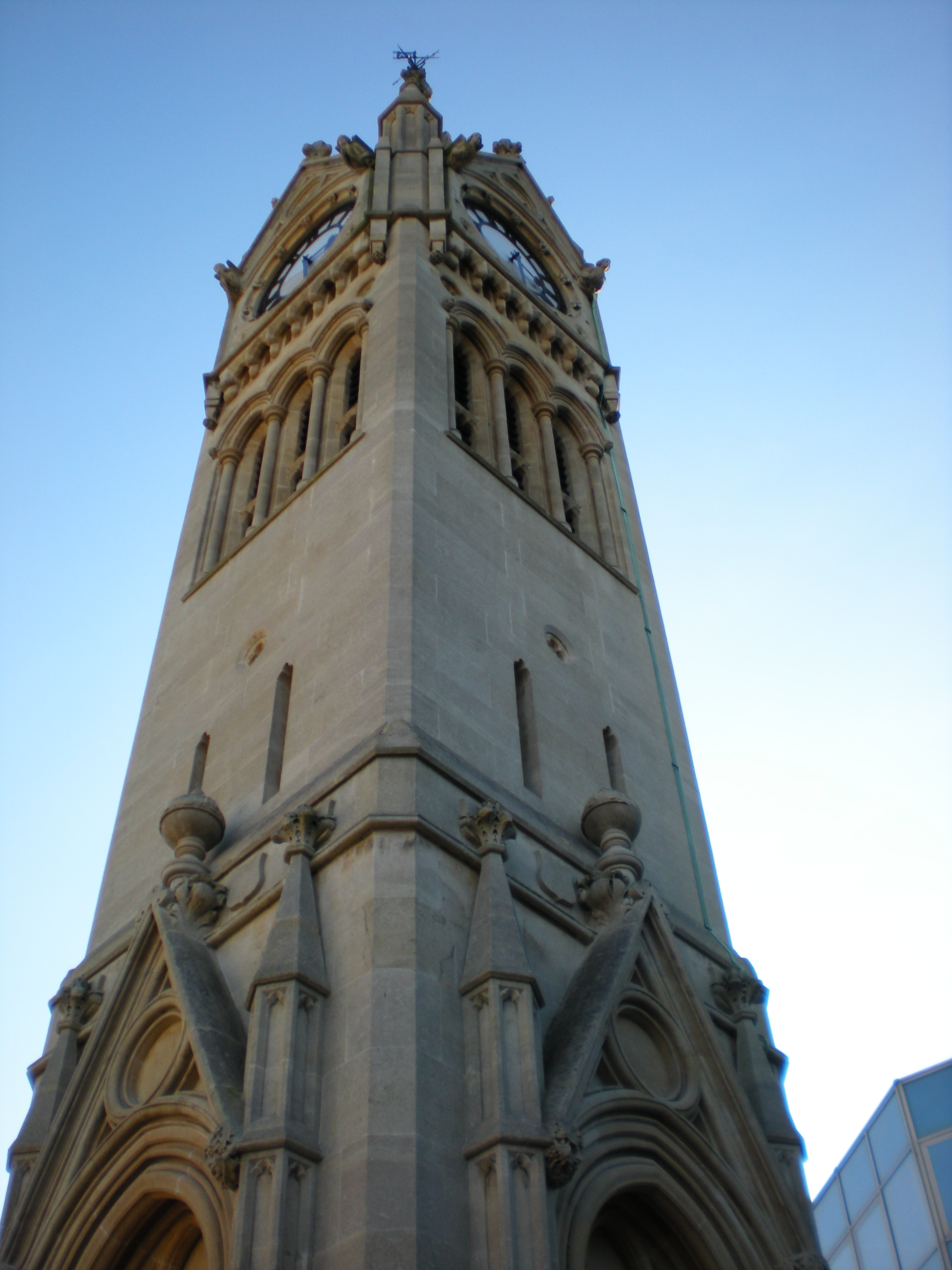
The clock tower at Surbiton was built to celebrate the 1902 coronation of King Edward VII.

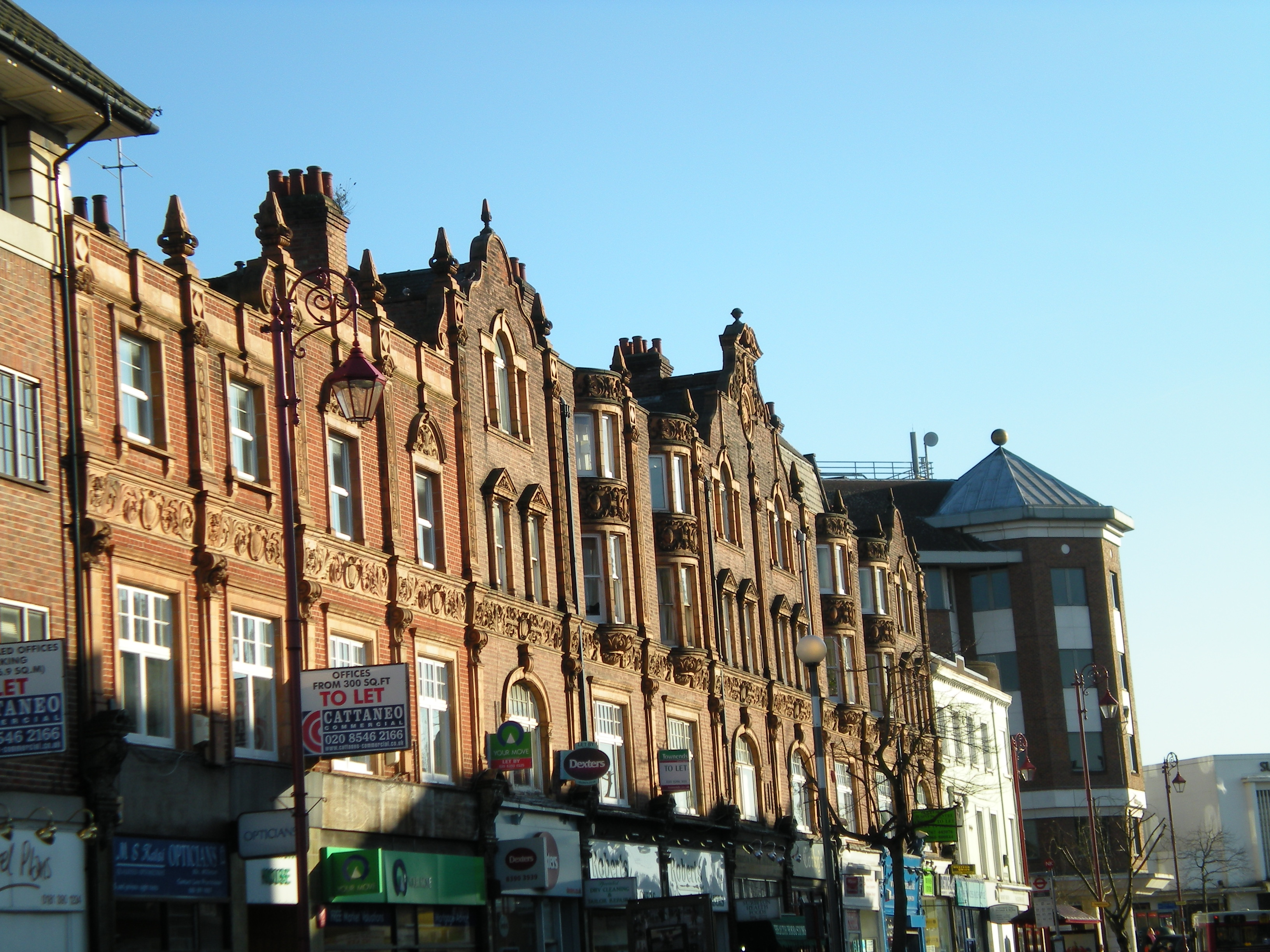
Claremont Road in Surbiton.

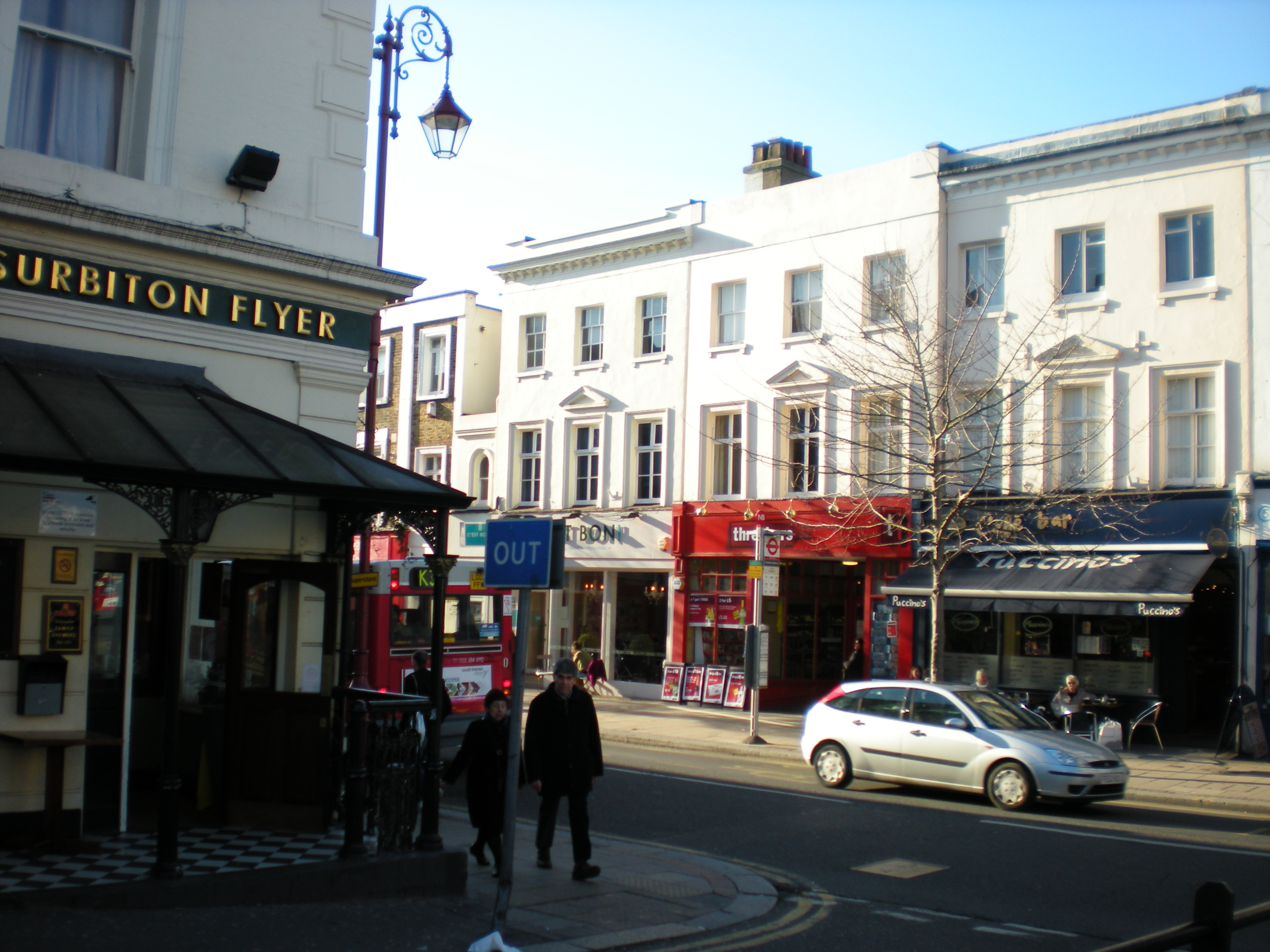
Shops in Victoria Road, Surbiton.

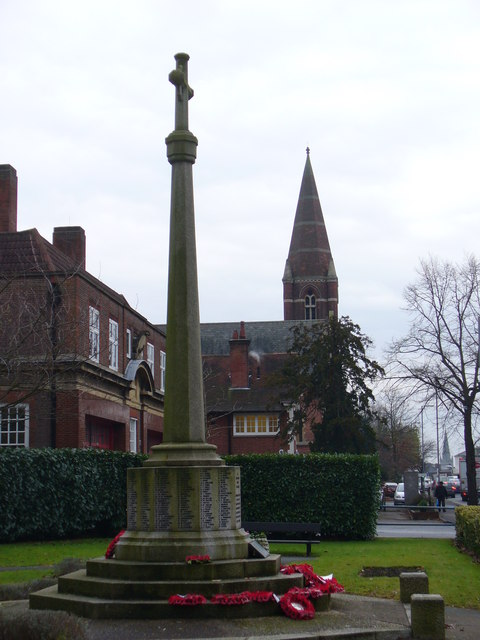
Surbiton War Memorial

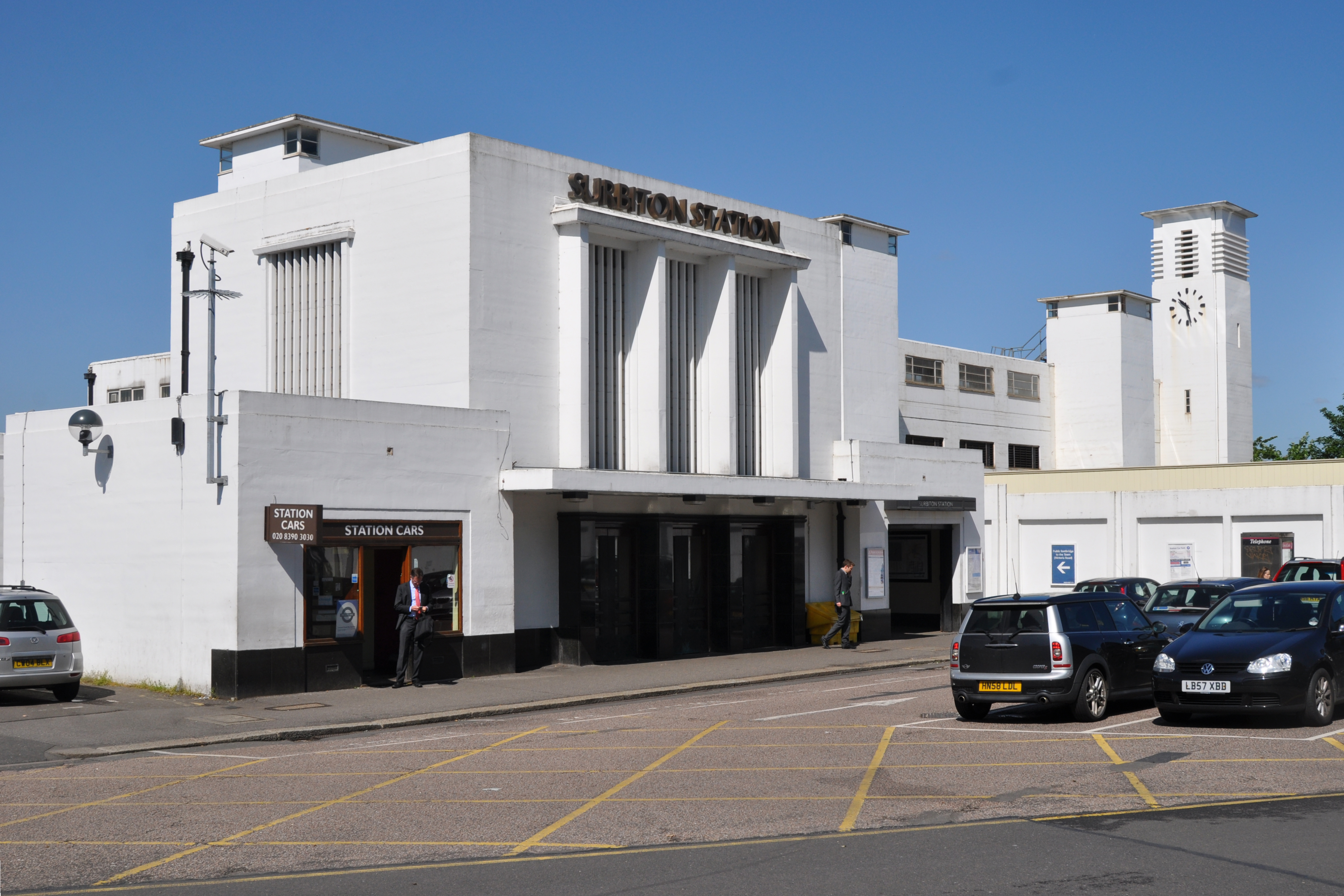
The lesser seen rear of Surbiton Station

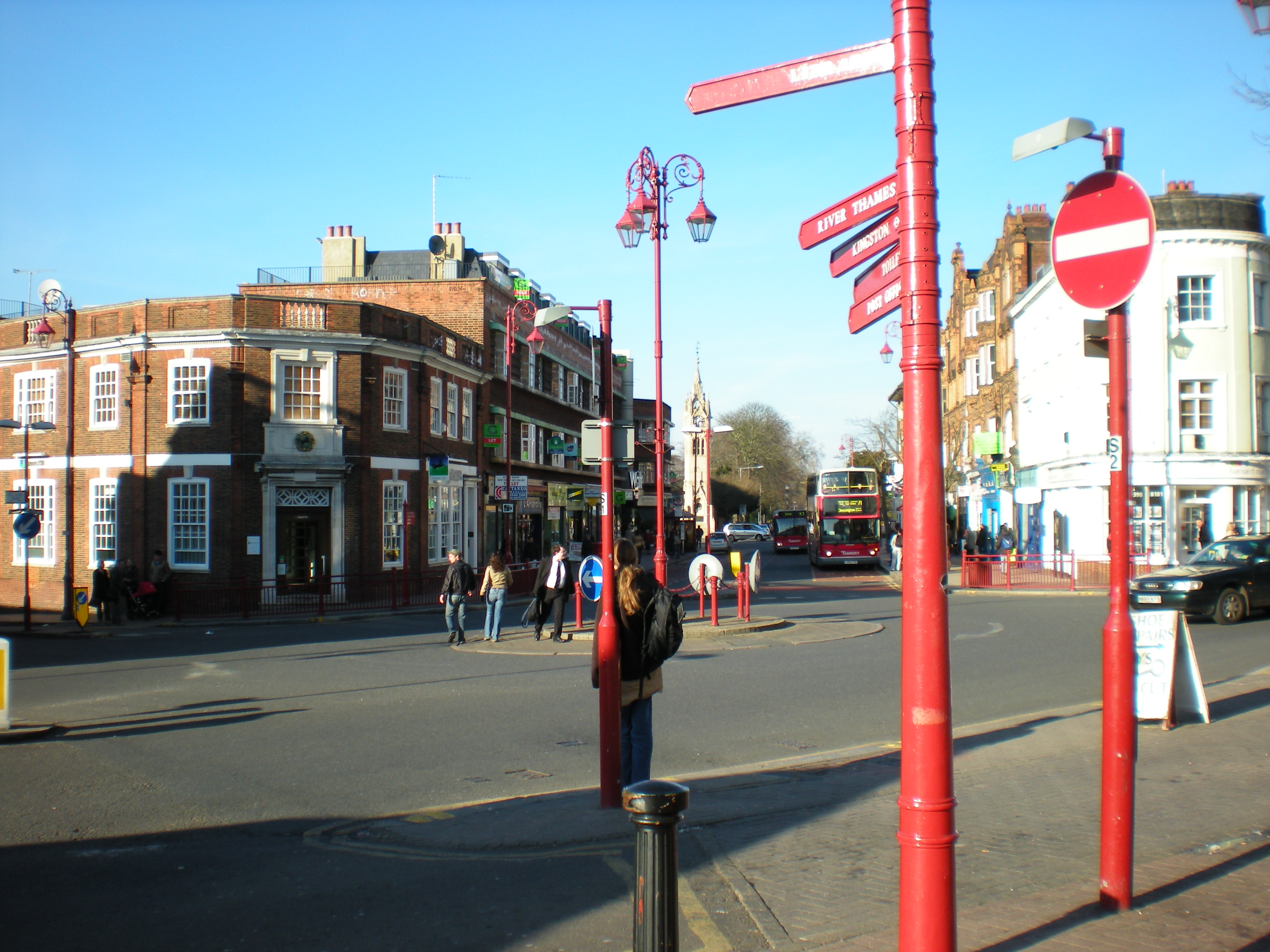
The roundabout outside Surbiton railway station.

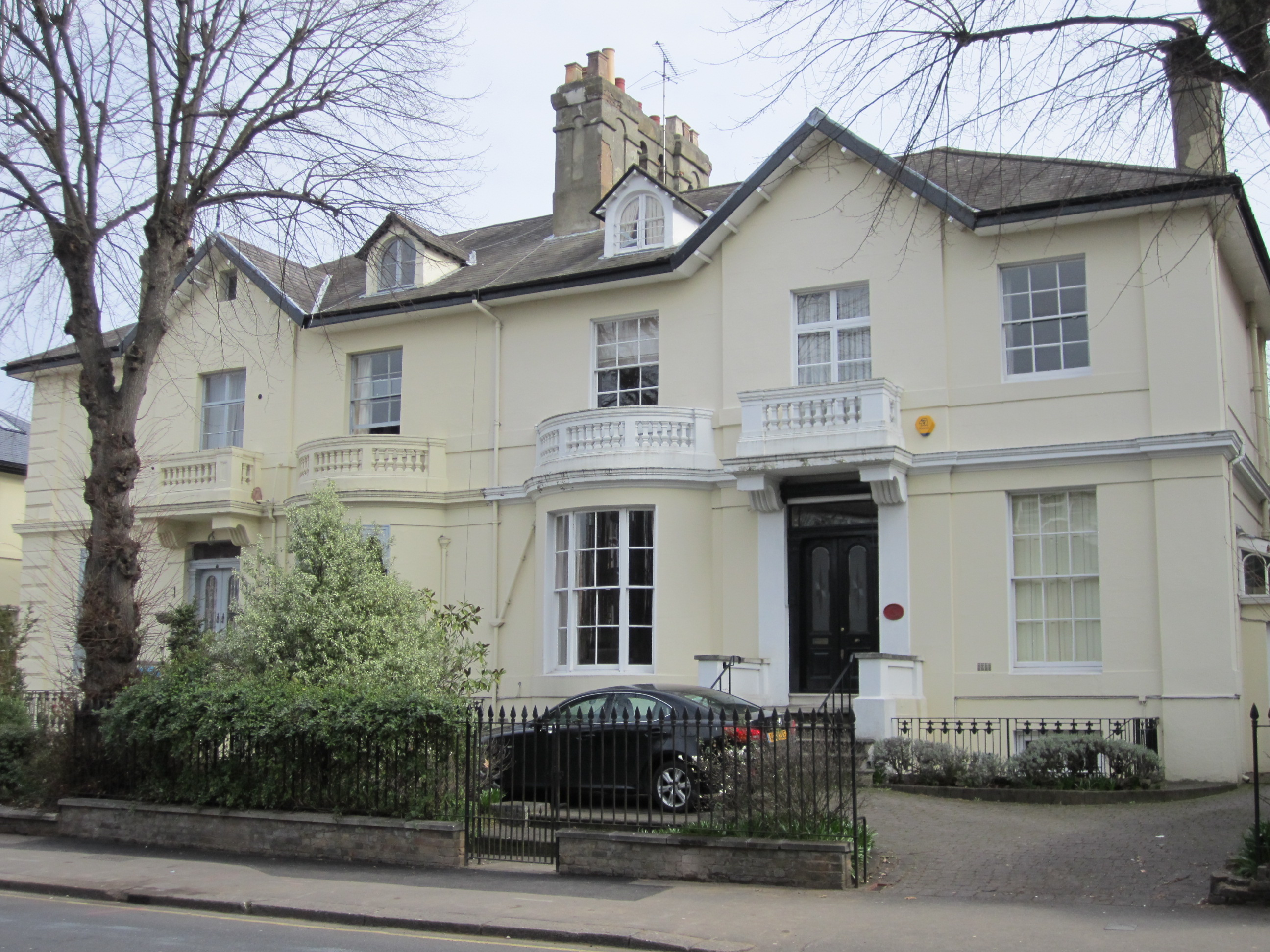
Thomas Pooley period houses on Claremont Road.

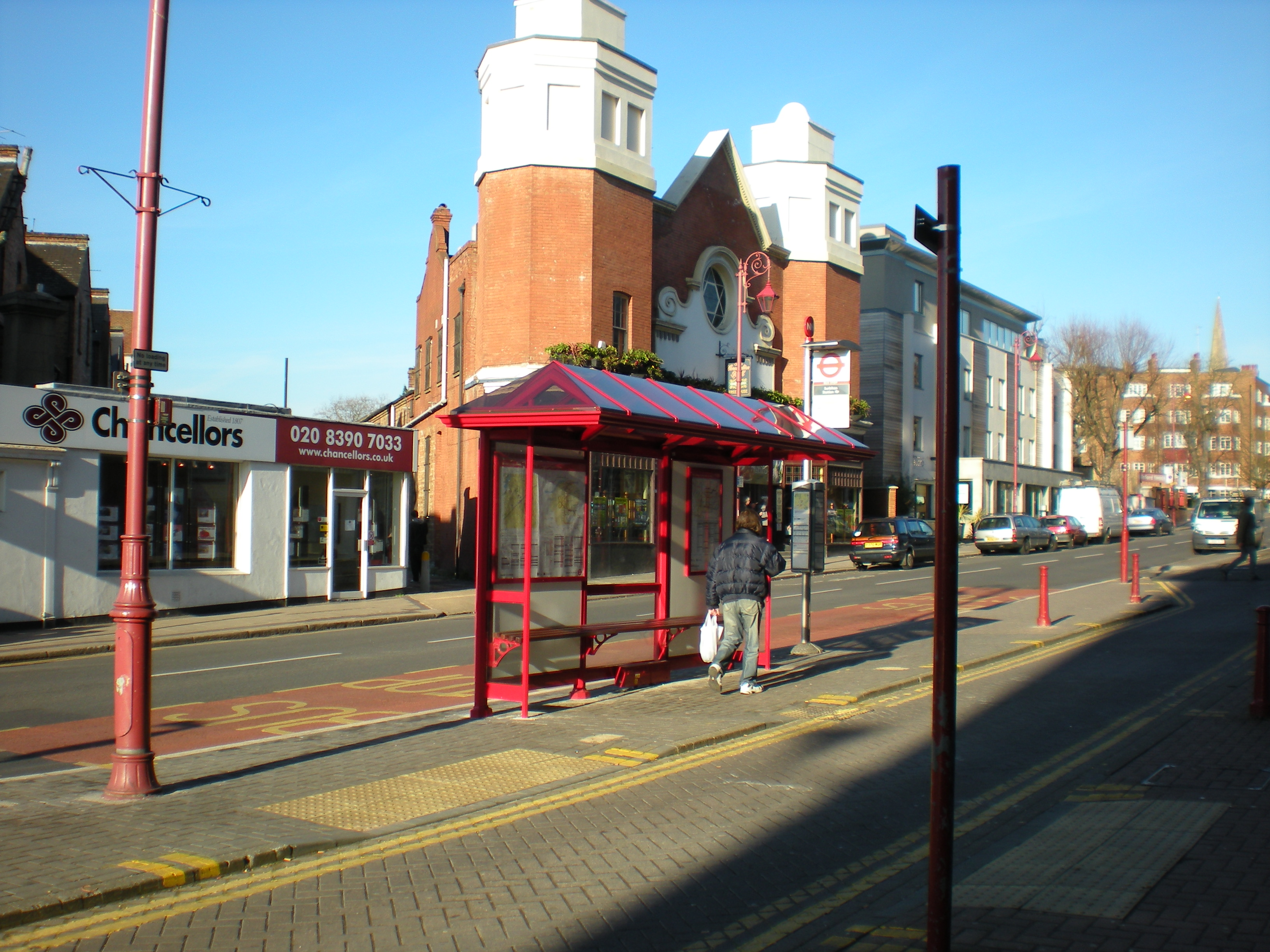
The bus shelter outside Surbiton railway station.

St Raphael's Roman Catholic Church overlooking the River Thames.

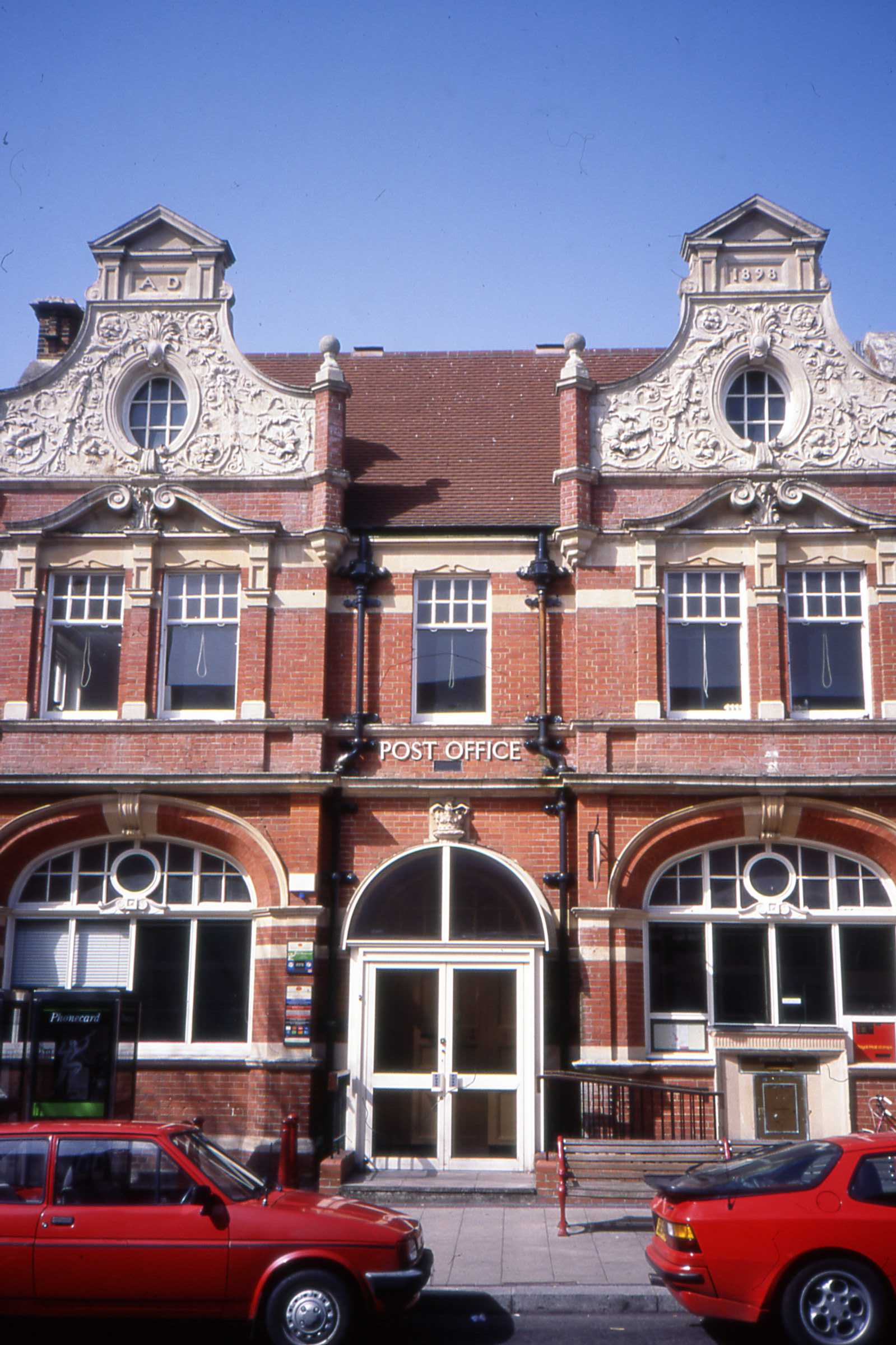
Surbiton Branch Post Office, now a Megan’s restaurant.

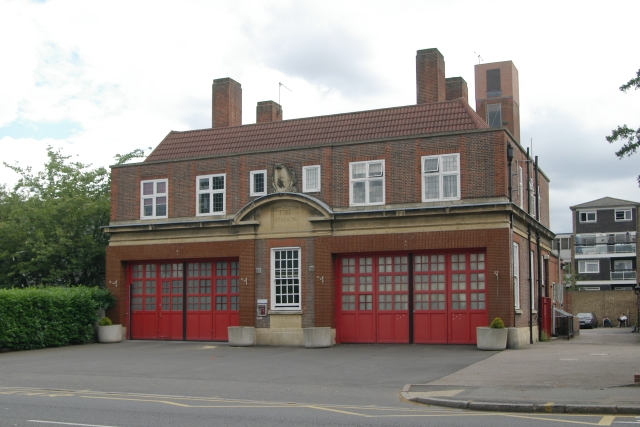
Surbiton Fire Station.

Guildford Avenue, a typical tree lined Surbiton street.

The east window of St Mark’s church.
