= Ilsley =

Ilsley may refer to:

- Ilsley (name)
- Ilsley (ship), a private schooner in the War of 1812
- East Ilsley or West Ilsley, possible site of the Battle of Ashdown (a defeat of the Danes by Alfred the Great)
- Ilsley, Kentucky, an unincorporated community, United States

== See also ==
- Illsley
