= 1994 Kingston upon Thames London Borough Council election =

1994 local election in England

- 5 May 1994

All 50 seats up for election to Kingston upon Thames London Borough Council 26 seats needed for a majority
- Registered: 96,986
- Turnout: 51,720, 53.33% (▼3.08)

	First party	Second party
Leader	John Tilley	Paul N.H. Clokie
Party	Liberal Democrats	Conservative
Leader since	1994	1990
Leader's seat	Canbury	Berrylands
Last election	18 seats, 30.30%	25 seats, 41.52%
Seats before	18	25
Seats won	26	18
Seat change	▲8	▼7
Popular vote	54,642	42,557
Percentage	43.14%	33.60%
Swing	▲12.84	▼7.92
	Third party	Fourth party
Leader	Unknown	George A. Forsyth
Party	Labour	Green
Leader since	Unknown	2 July 1993
Leader's seat	Unknown	Norbiton
Last election	7 seats, 25.96%	0 seats. 1.68%
Seats before	6	1
Seats won	6	0
Seat change	Steady	▼1
Popular vote	27,398	2,069
Percentage	21.63%	1.63%
Swing	▼4.33	▼0.05
Council control before election
No Overall Control
Council control after election
Liberal Democrats

The 1994 Kingston upon Thames Council election took place on 5 May 1994 to elect members of Kingston upon Thames London Borough Council in London, England. The whole council was up for election and the Liberal Democrats gained overall control of the council. Turnout for the election was 53.33%.

== Election result ==
1994 Kingston Upon Thames local elections
Party	Seats	Gains	Losses	Net gain/loss	Seats %	Votes %	Votes	+/−
Liberal Democrats	26	8	0	▲8	52.00	43.14	54,642	▲12.84
Conservative	18	0	7	▼7	36.00	33.60	42,557	▼7.92
Labour	6	0	0	Steady	12.00	21.63	27,398	▼4.33
Green	0	0	1	▼1	0.00	1.63	2,069	▼0.05
Total	50						126,666	

== Ward results ==
(*) - Indicates an incumbent candidate

(†) Indicates an incumbent candidate standing in a different ward

=== Berrylands ===
Berrylands (3)
Party	Candidate	Votes	%	±%
Conservative	Edna Gray*	1,457	46.08	▼9.40
Conservative	Peter Gray*	1,446		
Conservative	Paul Clokie*	1,405		
Liberal Democrats	John Walker	970	29.36	▲15.09
Liberal Democrats	Martin Cooper-Mitchell	958		
Liberal Democrats	Vijay Solanki	818		
Labour	John Lee	500	13.80	▼5.32
Labour	John Phillips	412		
Labour	Santanu Chakrabarti	377		
Green	Adrian Chaffey	335	10.75	New
Registered electors		6,099		▼132
Turnout		3,076	50.43	▼1.81
Rejected ballots		9	0.29	▼0.08
Conservative hold				
Conservative hold				
Conservative hold				

=== Burlington ===
Burlington (2)
Party	Candidate	Votes	%	±%
Liberal Democrats	Derek Osbourne*	1,252	53.89	▲4.09
Liberal Democrats	Adrian McCleay*	1,198		
Conservative	Douglas Frost	706	30.31	▼2.78
Conservative	Ravindra Jansari	672		
Labour	Geoffrey Waugh	366	15.80	▼1.31
Labour	Barry Whatley	352		
Registered electors		3,980		▼67
Turnout		2,351	59.07	▼1.64
Rejected ballots		3	0.13	▲0.05
Liberal Democrats hold				
Liberal Democrats hold				

=== Cambridge ===
Cambridge (3)
Party	Candidate	Votes	%	±%
Liberal Democrats	Julie Haines*	1,966	61.08	▲13.27
Liberal Democrats	Ian Manders*	1,895		
Liberal Democrats	Arthur Heamon	1,854		
Conservative	Matthew Frost	928	28.86	▼11.01
Conservative	Dominic Metcalfe	892		
Conservative	Sellen Somers	879		
Labour	Audrey Barker	342	10.07	▼2.25
Labour	Molly Kelly	304		
Labour	Sally Richardson	295		
Registered electors		5,561		▼25
Turnout		3,224	57.98	▼6.34
Rejected ballots		6	0.19	▲0.05
Liberal Democrats hold				
Liberal Democrats hold				
Liberal Democrats hold				

=== Canbury ===
Canbury (3)
Party	Candidate	Votes	%	±%
Liberal Democrats	John Tilley*	1,585	51.44	▲9.81
Liberal Democrats	Richard Lillicrap	1,565		
Liberal Democrats	David Twigg*	1,506		
Labour	Rosemary Webb	871	27.24	▼3.81
Labour	Christopher Priest	826		
Labour	Trevor Webb	768		
Conservative	Jonathan Cooper	479	15.58	▼2.95
Conservative	Roy Beat	474		
Conservative	Lynne Dunn	456		
Green	Duncan Gordon	173	5.73	▼3.06
Registered electors		5,202		▲98
Turnout		3,020	58.05	▼4.78
Rejected ballots		3	0.10	▲0.04
Liberal Democrats hold				
Liberal Democrats hold				
Liberal Democrats hold				

=== Chessington North ===
Chessington North (2)
Party	Candidate	Votes	%	±%
Liberal Democrats	Brian Bennett*	1,507	76.57	▲12.15
Liberal Democrats	Vicki Harris	1,420		
Conservative	Emmanuel Brooker	283	13.86	▼6.44
Conservative	Michael Hill	246		
Labour	Dorothy Hayball	188	9.57	▼5.71
Labour	John Hayball	178		
Registered electors		3,796		▲7
Turnout		2,035	53.61	▼8.78
Rejected ballots		2	0.10	▼0.02
Liberal Democrats hold				
Liberal Democrats hold				

=== Chessington South ===
Chessington South (3)
Party	Candidate	Votes	%	±%
Liberal Democrats	Sue Goodship*	1,684	45.72	▲6.99
Liberal Democrats	Sally Scrivens	1,612		
Liberal Democrats	Jeffrey Hanna*	1,585		
Conservative	Herbert Barker	998	26.61	▼5.58
Conservative	Ian Spiers	928		
Conservative	Stewart Graham	914		
Labour	Christopher Duggan	765	20.71	▼8.37
Labour	Peter Hurst	761		
Labour	Ian Michell	686		
Green	Ann Bainbridge	248	6.97	New
Registered electors		6,470		▼157
Turnout		3,634	56.17	▼2.51
Rejected ballots		4	0.11	▼0.04
Liberal Democrats hold				
Liberal Democrats hold				
Liberal Democrats hold				

=== Coombe ===
Coombe (2)
Party	Candidate	Votes	%	±%
Conservative	Kenneth Wootton*	989	60.51	▼3.43
Conservative	Robin Codd	923		
Liberal Democrats	Paul Jackson	349	21.77	▼4.38
Liberal Democrats	Michael Moss	338		
Labour	David Cooper	286	17.72	▼0.95
Labour	Leo Brightley	274		
Registered electors		3,422		▲399
Turnout		1,655	48.36	▼6.49
Rejected ballots		3	0.18	▲0.18
Conservative hold				
Conservative hold				

=== Grove ===
Grove (3)
Party	Candidate	Votes	%	±%
Liberal Democrats	Christine Hitchcock*	1,611	53.88	▲6.73
Liberal Democrats	Andrew Bull* (Note: Bull replaced Cllr Christopher Nicholson after his resignation in 1991)	1,548		
Liberal Democrats	Jonathan Oates	1,468		
Conservative	Terence Bowers	686	23.45	▼3.45
Conservative	Francis McHugh	665		
Conservative	Leon Grabman	661		
Labour	John Williams	470	15.86	▼1.89
Labour	Michael Ireland	449		
Labour	James Smy	444		
Green	Michael Stimson	195	6.81	▼1.39
Registered electors		6,034		▲551
Turnout		2,942	48.76	▼6.06
Rejected ballots		13	0.44	▲0.27
Liberal Democrats hold				
Liberal Democrats hold				
Liberal Democrats hold				

=== Hill ===
Hill (2)
Party	Candidate	Votes	%	±%
Conservative	David Edwards*	931	51.01	▼3.94
Conservative	Eric Humphrey	892		
Liberal Democrats	Peter Grender	451	24.38	▲10.38
Liberal Democrats	Andrew Ircha	420		
Labour	Julia Rees	335	18.51	▼2.52
Labour	Roger Price	327		
Green	Michael Elam	109	6.10	▼3.92
Registered electors		3,862		▲172
Turnout		1,825	47.26	▼3.80
Rejected ballots		3	0.16	Steady
Conservative hold				
Conservative hold				

=== Hook ===
Hook (2)
Party	Candidate	Votes	%	±%
Liberal Democrats	Ian Reid*	1,350	61.67	▼7.81
Liberal Democrats	Mary Watts^{†} (Note: Watts was a sitting councillor representing the Chessington South ward)	1,272		
Conservative	Nicola Griffith	623	28.50	▼0.69
Conservative	Timothy Brown	589		
Labour	Shaun McLoughlin	221	9.83	▼3.50
Labour	Rani Mould	196		
Registered electors		3,799		▲129
Turnout		2,247	59.15	▼2.78
Rejected ballots		1	0.04	▼0.05
Liberal Democrats hold				
Liberal Democrats hold				

=== Malden Manor ===
Malden Manor (2)
Party	Candidate	Votes	%	±%
Conservative	John Godden*	908	48.53	▼12.14
Conservative	Adrian Clare*	880		
Labour	Juliet Weller	510	27.14	▲3.73
Labour	Warren Kloman	490		
Liberal Democrats	Neil Bloom	454	24.32	▲8.40
Liberal Democrats	Caroline White	441		
Registered electors		3,958		▲222
Turnout		1,961	49.54	▼3.22
Rejected ballots		3	0.15	▼3.86
Conservative hold				
Conservative hold				

=== Norbiton ===
Norbiton (3)
Party	Candidate	Votes	%	±%
Labour	Steven Mama*	1,233	38.77	▼19.91
Labour	Julie Reay*	1,230		
Liberal Democrats	Anne Power	1,038	33.43	▲21.54
Liberal Democrats	Daniel Falchikov	1,019		
Labour	Matthew Rees	1,001		
Liberal Democrats	Sinnathamby Sivananda	931		
Green	George Forsyth*	478	16.05	▲5.57
Conservative	Gavin French	361	11.75	▼7.20
Conservative	Rupert Stephens	357		
Conservative	Mark Parry	333		
Registered electors		5,481		▲187
Turnout		2,890	52.73	▼1.46
Rejected ballots		6	0.21	▲0.17
Labour hold				
Labour hold				
Liberal Democrats gain from Green				

=== Norbiton Park ===
Norbiton Park (2)
Party	Candidate	Votes	%	±%
Liberal Democrats	Jennifer Ozanne	1,086	46.35	▲23.74
Liberal Democrats	Jonathan Stratford	1,048		
Conservative	Jeffrey Reardon*	937	40.57	▼16.55
Conservative	Frank Hartfree*	931		
Labour	Gerald Jones	241	9.82	▼10.45
Labour	Sharon Waugh	211		
Green	Jean Vidler	75	3.26	New
Registered electors		4,181		▲48
Turnout		2,404	57.49	▲1.43
Rejected ballots		3	0.12	▲0.03
Liberal Democrats gain from Conservative				
Liberal Democrats gain from Conservative				

=== St James ===
St James (3)
Party	Candidate	Votes	%	±%
Conservative	David Fraser*	1,350	50.04	▼10.49
Conservative	Michael Amson	1,248		
Conservative	Rajendra Pandya	1,111		
Liberal Democrats	Heather McDonald	711	27.57	▲12.38
Liberal Democrats	Alexander Folkes	698		
Liberal Democrats	Peter Stotesbury	633		
Labour	Barry Bennett	573	22.39	▼1.89
Labour	Thomas Leonard	553		
Labour	Philip Marsden	533		
Registered electors		5,164		▲11
Turnout		2,664	51.59	▼5.43
Rejected ballots		7	0.26	▲0.12
Conservative hold				
Conservative hold				
Conservative hold				

=== St Marks ===
St Marks (3)
Party	Candidate	Votes	%	±%
Liberal Democrats	Gerry Goring	1,656	48.68	▲30.13
Liberal Democrats	Jennifer Tankard	1,565		
Liberal Democrats	Mary Watts	1,497		
Conservative	Rupert Matthews*	1,101	33.55	▼11.05
Conservative	Karon Campbell	1,092		
Conservative	Paul Johnston	1,060		
Labour	Arthur Cheston	360	10.83	▼11.18
Labour	Frances James	354		
Labour	Mary James	337		
Green	Martin Lake	224	6.93	▼7.91
Registered electors		6,398		▲690
Turnout		3,244	50.70	▲1.91
Rejected ballots		6	0.18	▲0.04
Liberal Democrats gain from Conservative				
Liberal Democrats gain from Conservative				
Liberal Democrats gain from Conservative				

=== Surbiton Hill ===
Surbiton Hill (3)
Party	Candidate	Votes	%	±%
Conservative	Justin Bradford*	1,058	41.02	▼6.69
Conservative	Jane Smith*	1,048		
Conservative	Albertine Gaur	1,037		
Labour	Anthony Banks	821	30.61	▲5.98
Labour	Christopher Coath	769		
Labour	Robert Ellis	756		
Liberal Democrats	Anthony Abbott	623	22.70	▲6.95
Liberal Democrats	Rolson Davies	575		
Liberal Democrats	Robert Eyre-Brook	541		
Green	Brian Holmes	145	5.68	▼6.03
Registered electors		5,688		▼68
Turnout		2,596	45.64	▼0.17
Rejected ballots		2	0.08	▲0.04
Conservative hold				
Conservative hold				
Conservative hold				

=== Tolworth East ===
Tolworth East (2)
Party	Candidate	Votes	%	±%
Liberal Democrats	David Ward	1,102	48.92	▲6.08
Liberal Democrats	Edmond Rosenthal	1,068		
Conservative	Christopher Hunt*	876	39.22	▼4.00
Conservative	Leslie Dale*	863		
Labour	Trevor Cox	268	11.86	▼2.08
Labour	Laurence Simmonds	257		
Registered electors		3,919		▲31
Turnout		2,301	58.71	▲1.41
Rejected ballots		3	0.13	▲0.10
Liberal Democrats gain from Conservative				
Liberal Democrats gain from Conservative				

=== Tolworth South ===
Tolworth South (2)
Party	Candidate	Votes	%	±%
Labour	Toby Flux*	973	51.07	▲0.98
Labour	Paul Wright*	892		
Liberal Democrats	Angela Davies	426	23.10	▲11.99
Liberal Democrats	Kevin Hutson	417		
Conservative	Philip Whiting	390	21.07	▼17.73
Conservative	Peter Groves	380		
Green	James Duffy	87	4.76	New
Registered electors		3,869		▲41
Turnout		1,905	49.24	▼9.43
Rejected ballots		6	0.31	▲0.13
Labour hold				
Labour hold				

=== Tolworth West ===
Tolworth West (2)
Party	Candidate	Votes	%	±%
Labour	Loraine Monk*	1,009	41.93	▼12.89
Labour	Jeremy Thorn	938		
Liberal Democrats	Celia Cooke	905	38.53	▲26.72
Liberal Democrats	Anthony Nias	885		
Conservative	Trevor Ribbins	459	19.54	▼13.83
Conservative	Adam Bradford	448		
Registered electors		4,128		▲225
Turnout		2,444	59.21	▲2.77
Rejected ballots		5	0.20	▲0.11
Labour hold				
Labour hold				

=== Tudor ===
Tudor (3)
Party	Candidate	Votes	%	±%
Conservative	David Cunningham*	1,460	44.54	▼4.28
Conservative	Quentin Edgington^{†} (Note: Edgington was a sitting councillor representing the Surbiton Hill ward)	1,396		
Conservative	Dennis Doe	1,351		
Liberal Democrats	Louise Bloom	1,116	33.26	▲10.30
Liberal Democrats	Christopher Leach	1,039		
Liberal Democrats	Stephen Harris	986		
Labour	Marion Richardson	705	22.20	▲3.82
Labour	Robert Kelly	699		
Labour	Derrick Chester	692		
Registered electors		5,975		▼54
Turnout		3,302	55.26	▼4.83
Rejected ballots		0	0.00	▼0.08
Conservative hold				
Conservative hold				
Conservative hold				
