= WCRA (disambiguation) =

WCRA may refer to:

- WCRA, a radio station (1090 AM) licensed to Effingham, Illinois, United States
- West Coast Railway Association, a rail preservation society in Squamish, British Columbia, Canada
- Women's Cycle Racing Association
