= Illsley =

Illsley is a surname. Notable people with the surname include:

- Eric Illsley (born 1955), British politician
- John Illsley (born 1949), English musician
- Leslie Illsley (1936–1989), English artist and sculptor
- Mark Illsley (born 1958), American film director

== See also ==
- Ilsley (name)
