= Berrylands =

Residential neighbourhood in Surbiton, London

Coordinates: 51.393°N 0.287°W

- Suburb
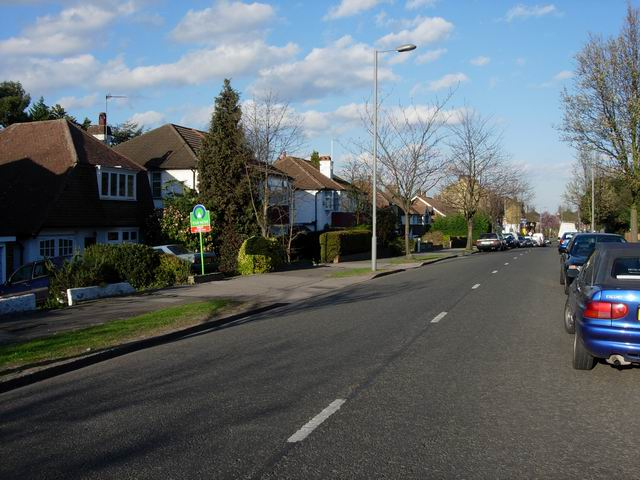

- Location within Greater London
- Population: 9,437 (2011 Census. Ward)
- OS grid reference: TQ195675
- London borough: Kingston
- Ceremonial county: Greater London
- Region: London
- Country: England
- Sovereign state: United Kingdom
- Post town: Surbiton
- Postcode district: KT5
- Dialling code: 020
- Police: Metropolitan
- Fire: London
- Ambulance: London
- UK Parliament: Kingston and Surbiton
- London Assembly: South West

Berrylands is a residential neighbourhood in Surbiton, London, originally forming part of the Municipal Borough of Surbiton, and since 1965 is part of the Royal Borough of Kingston upon Thames. It is a suburban development situated 10.1 miles (16.3 km) south west of Charing Cross. Nearby places include Surbiton, New Malden, Old Malden, Tolworth and Chessington. Berrylands railway station is 24 minutes from London Waterloo by train.

== History ==
Berrylands is a settlement of Anglo-Saxon origin that is close to the Thames. Berrylands originally formed part of the Municipal Borough of Surbiton, but in 1965 it was incorporated as part of the Royal Borough of Kingston upon Thames.

Most of the present housing development took place in the 1930s on the former Berrylands Farm.

Maps from the 1860s show the western banks of the Hogsmill River and everything around them to be mostly empty apart from a few small trails and farm buildings with no evidence of real human settlement. The area had absolutely no annotations of the word Berrylands to mark the area. In the late 19th and early 20th centuries, the only prominent structure was the Regent House, the main building of Berrylands Farm.

The land was developed around the early 1930s and was complemented in 1933 with the opening of Berrylands Station. The construction of all the homes in one go was the reason why they all look similar. The Regent House was demolished to make way for new housing, with the street where the building used to stand appropriately being named Regent Road. In some gardens, parts of the regent house's foundation are still visible.

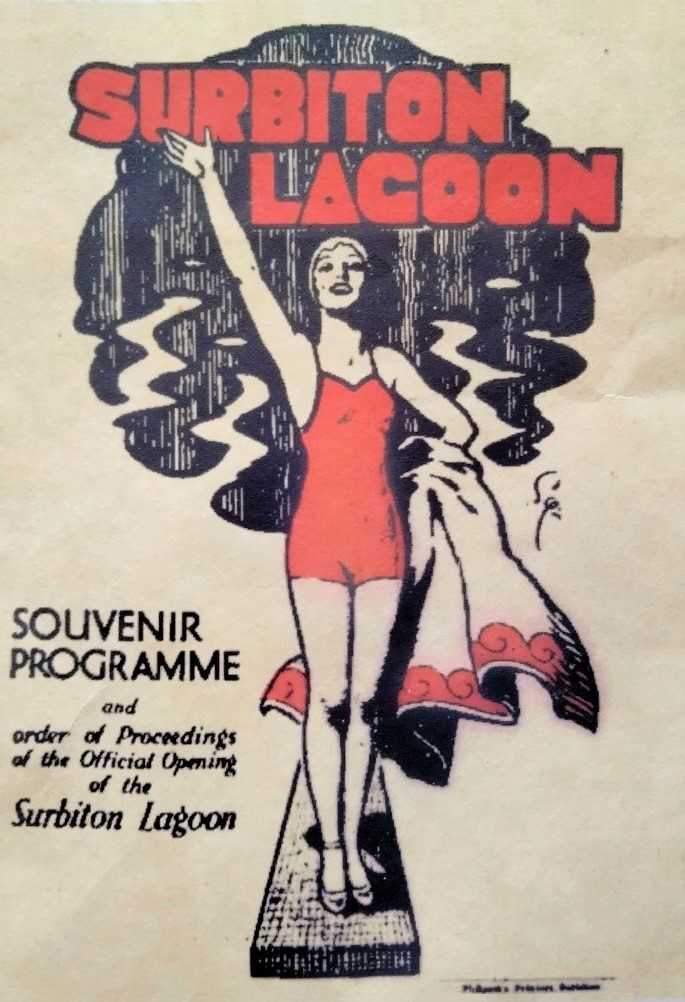
Surbiton Lagoon, opening day souvenir programme.

The Surbiton Lagoon lido opened in 1934, but later closed in 1980, and was demolished at the end of the decade. This area was subsequently transformed into a park now owned and managed by Kingston Council, known as Berrylands Park, with a small area to the south developed into housing, creating Meldone Close. By Meldone Close a small car park was also constructed.

== Etymology ==
The place-name of Berrylands means "land on a tumulus or hill", from the Old English beorg (modern dialectal "barrow" meaning "hill"), cognate with the Old Norse bergr, bjorgr and borgr which mean the same thing, and the Old English land ("land"). The name was recorded as Berilendes in 1126, and as Berulind in 1148 (wrongly suggesting the Old English lindr "lime-tree" as the second element), and more recently as Barrilands in 1378, which shows the true origin as being from the Old English beorg. The name has occasionally been mistaken as meaning the bottom of the hill as opposed to the hill itself.

In a sense, the name corresponds to the modern English "Hill Farm", a common name for farms (and some new residences) across the United Kingdom.

== Politics ==
Berrylands is part of the Kingston and Surbiton constituency for elections to the House of Commons of the United Kingdom.

Berrylands is part of the Berrylands ward for elections to Kingston upon Thames London Borough Council.

== Housing, shops and transport ==
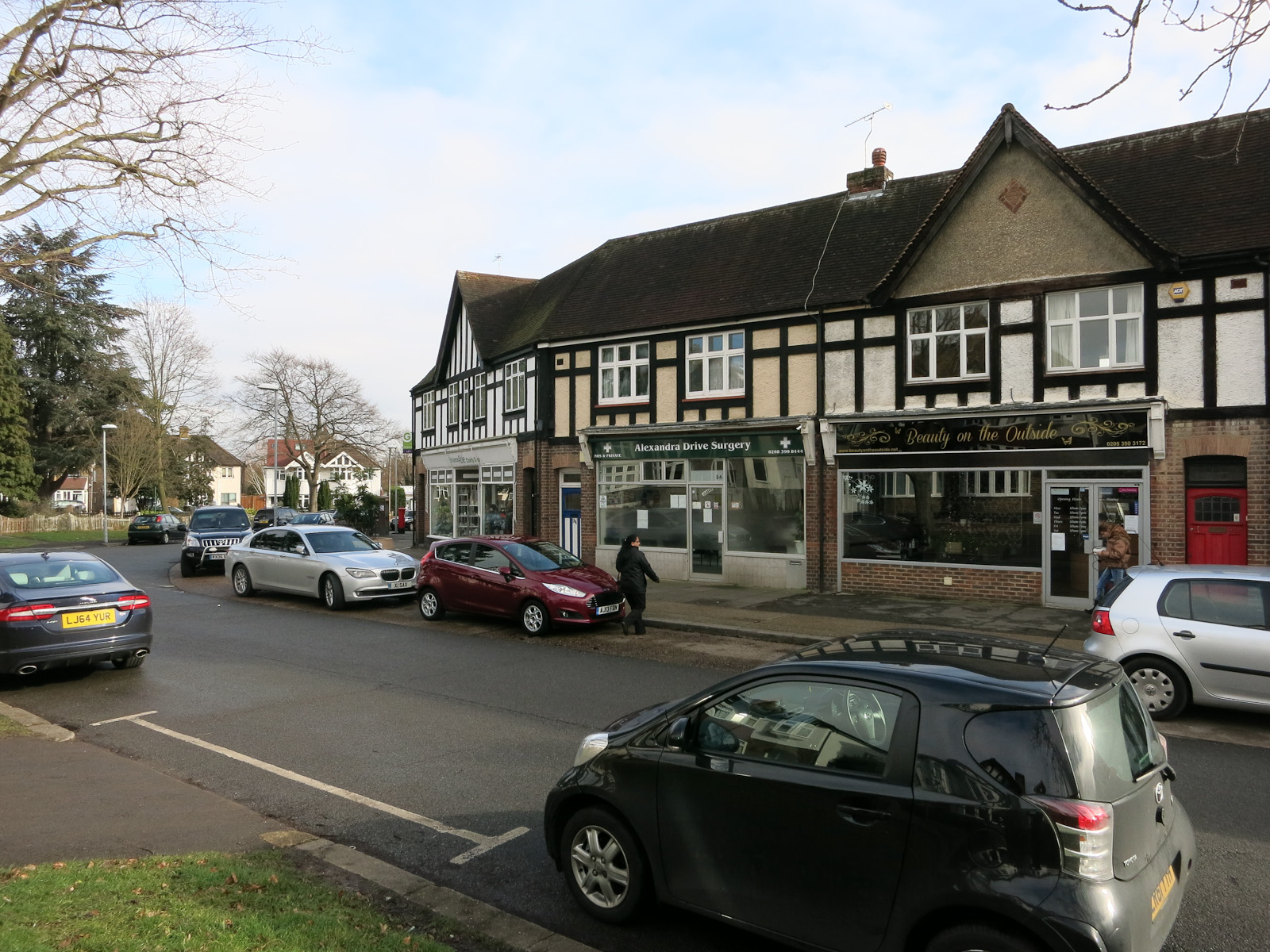
Shops on Alexandra Drive

There are four separate parades of shops: Alexandra Drive, Berrylands Road, Chiltern Drive and a smaller parade along Surbiton Hill Park. Chiltern Drive is at the centre of Berrylands, and houses over 22 businesses as well as the Berrylands public house, ‘The Berrylands’, known locally as 'The Berry'. The shops were built in the 1930s, and currently consist of a newsagent's, doctor's surgery, hairdresser's, beauty salon, CCTV shop, barber's, coffee shop, printer and bookshop, as well as the Berrylands railway station.

The neighbourhood is primarily residential. It houses a large commuter population using Transport for London travel routes, including two bus routes, the K2 and 665, and the Berrylands, Surbiton or Tolworth links to London Waterloo.

The majority of houses in the neighbourhood were built in the 1930s and have features typically found in housing stock of the inter-war period. Although most houses are semi-detached there are also many detached properties and a small number of flats. On the fork of Grand Avenue and Elmbridge Avenue is a cluster of Modernist Art Deco houses, built as part of the Parkside estate in 1934 (developer Bell). There is also a little variety in architecture with small flat blocks on Surbiton Hill Park just north of the railway station.

== Geography ==
Berrylands Station is the closest station to the sports ground of the London School of Economics and Political Science, which is in New Malden. There is a large water treatment plant on the opposite side of the railway. There are two large parks in Berrylands - Fishponds and Alexandra Park. The nearby Green Lane park is officially located in New Malden, but most locals consider it to be within Berrylands.

=== Rivers ===
The Hogsmill River marks much of the border between Berrylands and New Malden. Its small tributary, a man-made brook, runs through the nature reserve on the site of the former Surbiton Lagoon and through Alexandra Park before leaving the neighbourhood.

== Nature reserves ==
=== Raeburn open space ===
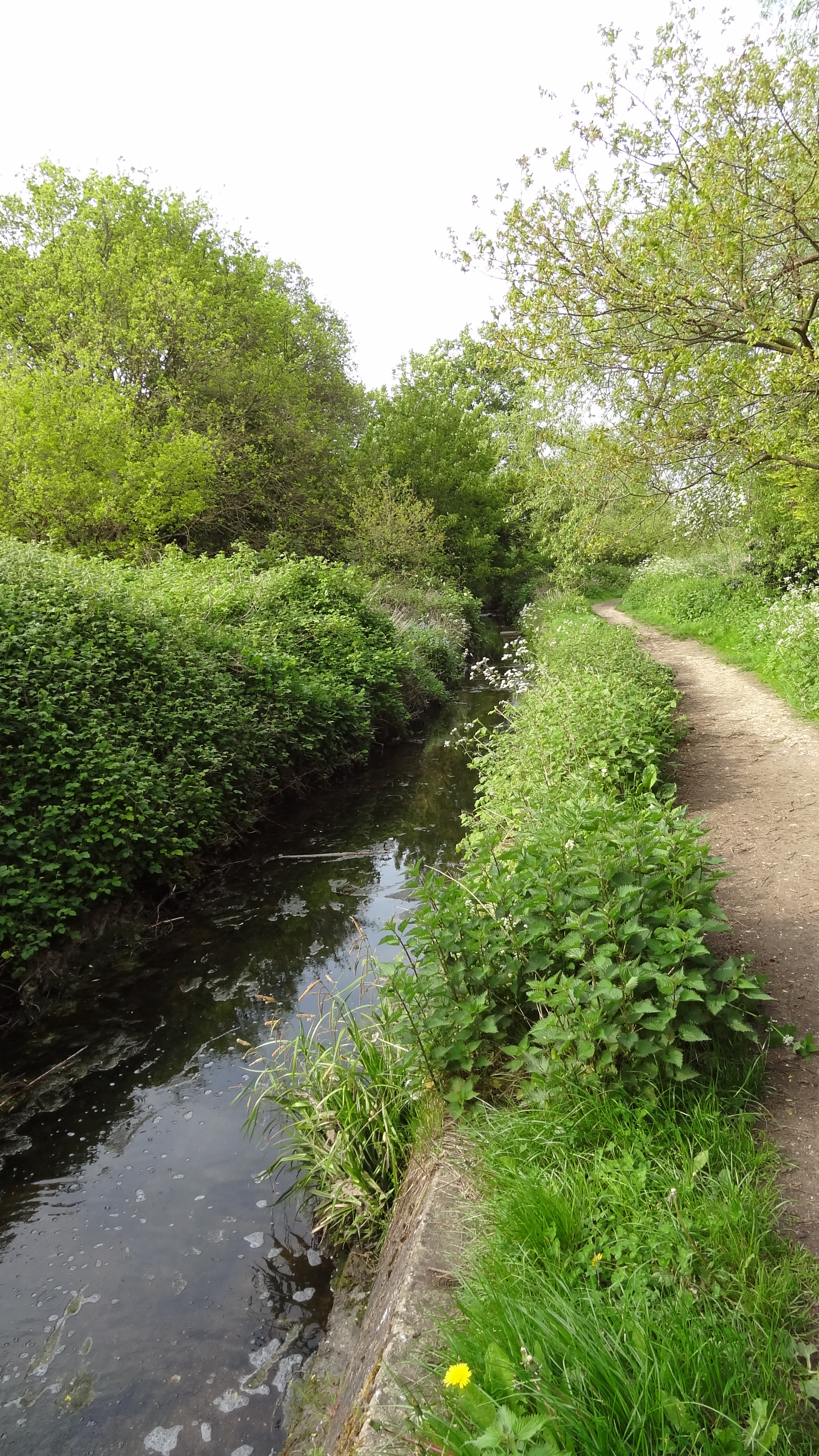
Raeburn open space

In 2017 the Environment Trust acquired a grant for £168,000 from Thames Water, to support a three-year community project enhancing the river habitat, creating wetland habitat, and improving the undermanaged woodland. In July 2018 a footbridge was opened to create a nature trail into previously inaccessible corners of the nature reserve. The Small River running through the nature reserves had some changes done to it; blocks of dirt were placed in corners of the river to make it meander more, and the weirs were removed. This was done to allow fish further downstream to freely swim across the whole river.

The nature reserve had existed prior to 2017, but it was just a small park with the river and some trees. There were some pathways on either side of the riverbank, but the only bridge was at the edge of the nature reserve at Stirling Walk. The Berrylands Scout Camp was situated at the edge of the nature reserve by the bridge, and the scouts often used the field in that nature reserve for games. Adjacent to the Raeburn open space was Berrylands Park, the former site of the Surbiton Lagoon.

=== Rose Walk Nature Reserve ===
There is another small nature reserve just south of the railway line at the corner of Raeburn Avenue and Surbiton Hill Park called Rose Walk Nature Reserve. It has had no large investment and is more of just a small green area where people can walk their dogs and be around nature. However, it is directly south of the South Western Main Line, which generates a lot of noise.

== Education ==
There are two main schools in Berrylands, Christ Church Primary School and Grand Avenue Primary School. Grand Avenue, according to official boundaries, is within Tolworth, but is widely recognised alongside all the housing around it to be a part of Berrylands. Most students of the school reside there.

== Sport ==
The Surbiton Racket and Fitness club on Berrylands was established in 1881. It was founded and was known as the Berrylands Lawn Tennis Club. There were 200 members and 11 grass courts. Adjacent to the grass courts are a variety of clay courts often used by Christ Church Primary School, which is south of it. A building on the other side of the grass courts contains various squash courts which are also used occasionally by the nearby school. Grand Avenue Primary school has a swimming pool which serves both schools in Berrylands and also offers private lessons.

== Berrylands Festival ==
Each year the local scout group organises a summer festival opposite their scout hut on the site of the old Surbiton Lagoon, now known by Kingston Council as Berrylands Park.
