= Eileen Gray (cyclist) =

British cyclist (1920–2015)

Eileen Gray CBE
Personal information
- Born: 25 April 1920 Bermondsey, London, England
- Died: 20 May 2015 (aged 95)

President of the British Cycling Federation
- In office 1976–1986

Sport
- Sport: Cycling

Edna Eileen Mary Gray (25 April 1920 – 20 May 2015) was an international bicycle racer who founded the Women's Cycle Racing Association, and was president of the British Cycling Federation. She was also mayor of the Royal Borough of Kingston upon Thames and Olympic torchbearer for the 2012 London Olympics.

== Early life ==
Gray was born in Bermondsey, London, on 25 April 1920. As a youngster she lived in Dulwich, near Herne Hill Velodrome. During World War II she was an engineer, a protected occupation which allowed her to look after her hospitalised mother. While a quality controller in an engine factory on the Harrow Road, a rail strike disrupted her travel from Herne Hill and she took up cycling, commuting through bomb-damaged streets. She joined the Apollo cycling club; other nearby clubs would not admit women.

== Cycling career ==
In 1946 Gray competed in a women's race at Ordrup, Copenhagen, Denmark, in Britain's first women's international team. In the Women's Cycle Racing Association, she promoted the cause of women's cycle racing.

In 1976 Gray became president of the British Cycling Federation, (now known as British Cycling).

== Awards and celebrations ==
Gray was appointed an Officer of the Order of the British Empire (OBE) in the 1978 Birthday Honours for service to the British Cycling Federation, and promoted to Commander of the Order of the British Empire (CBE) in the 1997 Birthday Honours for services to sport.

In 1991, aged 71, she was given a page in the Golden Book of Cycling, where she was described as a champion of women's racing and an administrator of vision and authority.

In 2010 Gray became one of the initial inductees into the British Cycling Hall of Fame, cited as "founding the Women's Cycle Racing Association of which she became BCF President" and as key to women's racing becoming part of the Olympics from 1984.

Gray was a torchbearer in Kingston for the 2012 London Olympics, on Tuesday 24 July .

== Freemasonry ==
In 2005 the BBC reported that Gray was the head of The Honourable Fraternity of Ancient Masons, one of two orders of women's Freemasons in the UK. In 2001, in a public message to the Women's Masonic Fraternity, she wrote that she had been a freemason for more than 50 years.

== Local government ==
Gray was a Conservative councillor between 1982 and 1998 in Royal Borough of Kingston upon Thames and was mayor of the borough for a year from May 1990.
