= Leslie Illsley =

English artist and sculptor

- Born: 1936; Surbiton, United Kingdom
- Died: 1989 (aged 52–53); Pendeen, United Kingdom
- Education: Kingston College of Art, Central St Martins
- Known for: Sculpture, painting, pottery
- Movement: Covertism

Leslie Illsley was an English artist and sculptor based in West Penwith. He was one of the founders of the Troika group (also known as Troika Pottery). Illsley is also the brother of prominent St Ives artist Bryan Illsley.

== Early life ==
Illsley was the second of three brothers born and raised in Surbiton. He attended Kingston College of Art where he graduated. He attended evening classes as Central St Martins in 1959 whilst working as a sculptor repairing Westminster Abbey by day. In 1960 entered the Young Contemporaries competition beating such names as Peter Blake, Maurice Agis and David Hockney to first prize. Illsley's influences were diverse from Brancusi and Paul Klee to Rembrandt.

== Troika ==
Illsley ran Troika with Benny Sirota from 1963 until Benny left the business in 1980 and eventually it closed in 1983. Illsley's idea was to get a bit of modern art into everyone's home without them realising. In this time, Illsley along with Roland Bence designed hundreds of pieces with each sides design considered a different piece of art. This arguably made Leslie Illsley one of Britains most prolific artists.
