= Surbiton Hill =

Electoral ward in London, England

- Electoral ward for the Kingston upon Thames London Borough Council
- Borough: Kingston upon Thames
- County: Greater London
- Population: 10,636 (2021)
- Major settlements: Surbiton
- Area: 1.624 km²

Current electoral ward
- Created: 1965
- Councillors: 3

Surbiton Hill is an electoral ward in the Royal Borough of Kingston upon Thames. The ward was first used in the 1964 elections and elects three councillors to Kingston upon Thames London Borough Council.

== Geography ==
The ward is named after the Surbiton Hill area.

== Councillors ==
| Election | Councillors | | |
|---|---|---|---|
| 2022 | Alison Holt (Liberal Democrats) | Amir Ali Khan (Liberal Democrats) | Tom Reeve (Liberal Democrats) |

== Elections ==
=== 2022 ===
Surbiton Hill (3)
| Party | Candidate | Votes | % |
|---|---|---|---|
| Liberal Democrats | Alison Holt * | 1,810 | 53.4 |
| Liberal Democrats | Tom Reeve | 1,629 | 48.1 |
| Liberal Democrats | Amir Ali Khan | 1,596 | 47.1 |
| Conservative | Caroline Bowis | 679 | 20.0 |
| Conservative | Andrew Innes | 642 | 19.0 |
| Conservative | Richard John Hudson | 535 | 15.8 |
| Labour | Simon Bevis Ayre | 382 | 11.3 |
| Green | Anna Katherine Burlingsby | 370 | 10.9 |
| Labour | Greta Lynne Farian | 338 | 10.0 |
| Labour | Rebecca Claire Way | 333 | 9.8 |
| Green | Claire Louise Burlingsby | 310 | 9.4 |
| Green | Patrick Lewis Goodacre | 291 | 8.9 |
| KIRG | Glen Colegate | 285 | 8.7 |
| KIRG | Hayley Smithers | 225 | 6.8 |
| KIRG | Mo Rajput | 181 | 5.5 |
| Total votes | | 9,606 | |
| Turnout | | 3,287 | 42.2 |
| Liberal Democrats win (new seat) | | | |
| Liberal Democrats win (new seat) | | | |
| Liberal Democrats win (new seat) | | | |

== See also ==
- List of electoral wards in Greater London
