= Berrylands railway station =

National Rail station in the borough of Kingston upon Thames, London

Berrylands
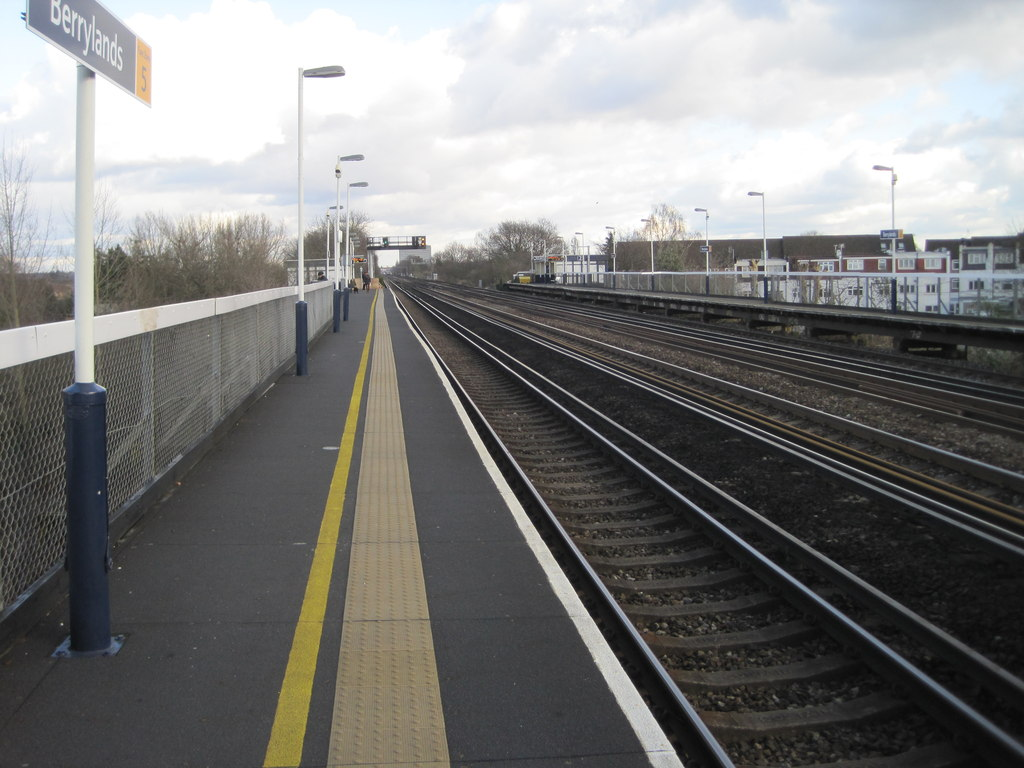
- The view from the DOWN end of platform 1 at Berrylands, prior to works commencing
- Interactive map of Berrylands

General information
- Location: Berrylands
- Local authority: Royal Borough of Kingston upon Thames
- Managed by: South Western Railway
- Station code: BRS
- DfT category: E
- Number of platforms: 2
- Tracks: 4
- Fare zone: 5

National Rail annual entry and exit
- 2020–21: ▼88,366
- 2021–22: ▲0.233 million
- 2022–23: ▲0.288 million
- 2023–24: ▲0.340 million
- 2024–25: ▲0.364 million

Key dates
- 16 October 1933: Opened
- 11 May 2026: Temporarily closed
- 30 September 2026: Reopened to public

Other information
- External links: Departures; Facilities
- Coordinates: 51.3988°N 0.2803°W

Berrylands railway station is a National Rail station serving the neighbourhood of Berrylands in the borough of Kingston upon Thames, London. It is 10 miles 78 chains (17.7 km) south-west of London Waterloo and is situated between New Malden and Surbiton.

== History ==
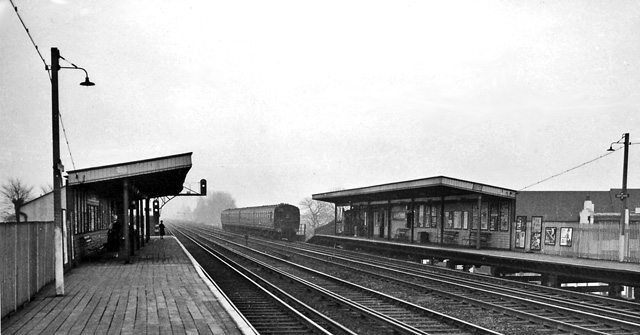
Berrylands Station in 1961

It was opened on 16 October 1933 to serve large housing developments, which gave the station its name. 90% of the cost of the station was financed by the local developers to enhance the attractiveness of the new estate to commuters.

A ground level ticket office, built in 1969, is connected by stairs to the platforms, which are on the outer tracks of the four-track main line. Until 2026, Berrylands was one of the few stations in the London area still with wooden platforms, although the platforms had an extension in 2014.

Network Rail closed the station from 11 May to 27 September 2026. In this time the original wooden platforms were replaced and the station facilities upgraded, including the staircases, lighting, help points, CCTV, and Customer Information Screens.

== Passenger volume ==
Passenger Volume at Berrylands
	2002–03	2004–05	2005–06	2006–07	2007–08	2008–09	2009–10	2010–11	2011–12	2012–13	2013–14	2014–15	2015–16	2016–17	2017–18	2018–19	2019–20	2020–21	2021–22	2022–23
Entries and exits	182,658	191,698	174,464	329,473	354,882	375,638	339,894	359,072	374,064	378,024	389,012	405,862	374,332	374,746	382,686	400,700	373,514	88,366	233,480	288,216

The statistics cover twelve month periods that start in April.

== Services ==
All services at Berrylands are operated by South Western Railway. The typical off-peak service in trains per hour is:

- 2 tph to London Waterloo via Wimbledon
- 2 tph to Hampton Court

Additional services call at the station during the peak hours.

If built, Crossrail 2 is planned to serve Berrylands on the way to Hampton Court, with four trains per hour in each direction.

Preceding station	National Rail	Following station
New Malden	South Western Railway South West Main Line	Surbiton

== Connections ==
London Buses route K2 and school route 665 serve the station.

== Bibliography ==
- Quick, Michael (2023). Railway Passenger Stations in Great Britain: A Chronology (PDF) (5th ed.). London: Railway and Canal Historical Society.
