= Troika Pottery =

Art pottery that operated in Cornwall from 1962 to 1983

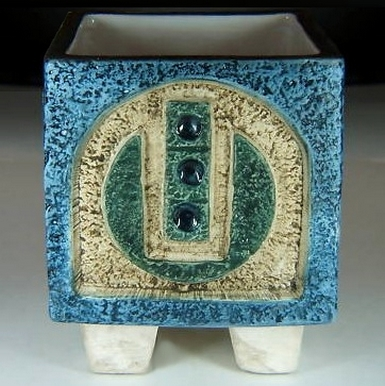
Square vase made at Troika Pottery

Troika was an art pottery that operated in Cornwall from 1962 to 1983. It was founded by three people, Leslie Illsley, Jan Thompson and Benny Sirota who took over the Powell and Wells Pottery at Wheal Dream, where Sirota had previously worked as a decorator and driver. The name is from the Russian тройка, meaning "a set of three", or triumvirate.

== History ==
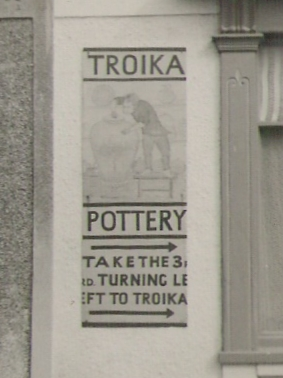
Troika Pottery sign

Troika was set up in February 1962 by Leslie Illsley, Jan Thompson and Benny Sirota who took over the Powell and Wells Pottery at Wheal Dream, St Ives, Cornwall, where Benny Sirota had previously worked. They wanted to pursue their vision of pottery as art, without regard to function. This ran counter to the aims of much of the studio pottery movement at the time, as epitomised by the work of Bernard Leach. They initially relied on the ceramics of Leslie's wife, Caroline (Kingston School of Art). This included the novel double egg cup and the Love plaque.

The venture rapidly became successful, gaining both critical praise and very high sales through a combination of the summer tourist trade and contracts with department stores such as Heals and Liberty in London. Vases, lamp bases and tableware were made using plaster moulds; tiles and wall plaques were also made in the early years.

The Troika pottery was based at the Wheal Dream site in St Ives from 1962 to 1970, when it moved to Fragden Place in Newlyn. Benny Sirota left in 1980, and with declining sales, the business closed in 1983.

From 19 January to 9 March 2013, an exhibition, Troika 1963-1983, was held at the Penlee House Gallery and Museum Penzance, celebrating 50 years since the inception of Troika, which included a number of prototypes by Leslie Illsley. Benny Sirota attended the opening, and explained the origin of the company's name: "my grandfather escaped from Russia dressed as a woman on a troika – a sledge with three horses...there were three of us who started the firm – and it just gelled."

== Ranges ==
Troika had two distinct ranges of ceramics — the rough textured wares and the smooth glazed wares. Although there was some crossover in shapes and styles between these ranges, they each had different characters and different successes. A number of examples can be found in the V&A collection.
