= Berrylands (ward) =

Electoral ward in London, England

- Electoral ward for the Kingston upon Thames London Borough Council
- Borough: Kingston upon Thames
- County: Greater London
- Population: 6,114 (2021)
- Major settlements: Berrylands
- Area: 1.091 km²

Current electoral ward
- Created: 1965
- Councillors: 2 (since 2022); 3 (1978–2022); 4 (1964–1978)

Berrylands is an electoral ward in the Royal Borough of Kingston upon Thames. The ward was first used in the 1964 elections and elects two councillors to Kingston upon Thames London Borough Council.

== Geography ==
The ward is named after the Berrylands area.

== Councillors ==
Election	Councillors	
2022	Jackie Davies (Liberal Democrats)	Anita Schaper (Liberal Democrats)

== Elections ==
=== 2022 ===
Berrylands (2)
Party	Candidate	Votes	%
Liberal Democrats	Jackie Davies	1,340	51.4
Liberal Democrats	Anita Margaret Schaper *	1,232	47.3
Conservative	Claire Harding	752	28.9
Conservative	Jagie Rai	679	26.1
Labour	Johnnie Byrne	279	10.7
Green	Philip Smith	271	10.4
Labour	Lawrence Roy Green	245	9.4
Green	Peter Anthony Whitworth	188	7.2
Liberal	Carole Ann	97	3.7
Total votes		5,083	
Turnout		2,606	54.5
Liberal Democrats win (new seat)			
Liberal Democrats win (new seat)			

== See also ==
- List of electoral wards in Greater London
