= Women's Cycle Racing Association =

Logo

The Women's Cycle Racing Association (WCRA) was a British organisation which sought to further the cause of women in cycling.

== History ==
Founded by Eileen Gray in 1949 under the name Women's Track Racing Association, it was eventually renamed the Women's Cycle Racing Association in 1956. The same year it organised the first British National Road Race Championships for women, which was won by Millie Robinson. There were no World Championship or Olympic events held for women at that time, but due to the work of the WCRA, a women's World Championships was first held in 1958, although it wasn't until 1984 that women were granted Olympic cycling events.

"The purpose of the Women's Cycle Racing Association is to increase the opportunity for women in all forms of cycle sport, to support them in cycling at all levels in all disciplines. To encourage British Cycling, CTT and other cycling organisations to improve opportunities for women to participate actively in all forms of cycling, to challenge inequality in press coverage, prize money, sponsorship and International opportunities for women." – Mission statement

In 2007, after 50 years of campaigning, the Association was brought to an end having considered to have achieved the goals of the founding members.

== Bibliography ==
- Eileen Gray. Rebel with a Cause.
