= Ilsley (name) =

Ilsley is both a surname and a given name. Notable people with the name include:

== Surname ==
- Blaise Ilsley (born 1964), American baseball coach and pitcher
- Daniel Ilsley (1740–1813), American politician (Representative from Massachusetts)
- Edward Ilsley (1838–1926), British Roman Catholic Archbishop of Birmingham, England
- Harry P. Ilsley (1884-1953), American judge
- George Ilsley (1928–2016), Australian rules footballer
- George K. Ilsley (born 1958), Canadian writer of gay literature
- James Lorimer Ilsley (1894–1967), Canadian politician

== Given name ==
- Ilsley Boone (1879–1968), promoter of nudism in the USA
