= Kingston Enquirer =

- Type: E-newspaper
- Format: Online e-newspaper
- Political alignment: Independent
- Headquarters: New Malden, London
- Circulation: c.11,000
- Price: free to access
- Website: Coombe Monthly

Kingston Enquirer (formerly Coombe Monthly) is an online publication covering news in the Royal Borough of Kingston upon Thames, South West London. It is run by local residents in the borough, and is free to access.

It is available as a free, paperless e-newspaper, accessible from their website and delivered straight to email inboxes each morning.

The paper also organises local community events, with the aim of "Engaging local residents in the issues around them", known as 'Kingston Question Time' events. These events donate all proceeds to Love Kingston, a local charity in the Royal Borough of Kingston Upon Thames, donating to 'Pathways out of Poverty'.

The newspaper was formerly run by James Giles, a New Malden resident, whose contributions to local news have been highlighted by the Surrey Comet.
