= New Malden =

Suburb of London

Coordinates: 51.40°N 0.252°W

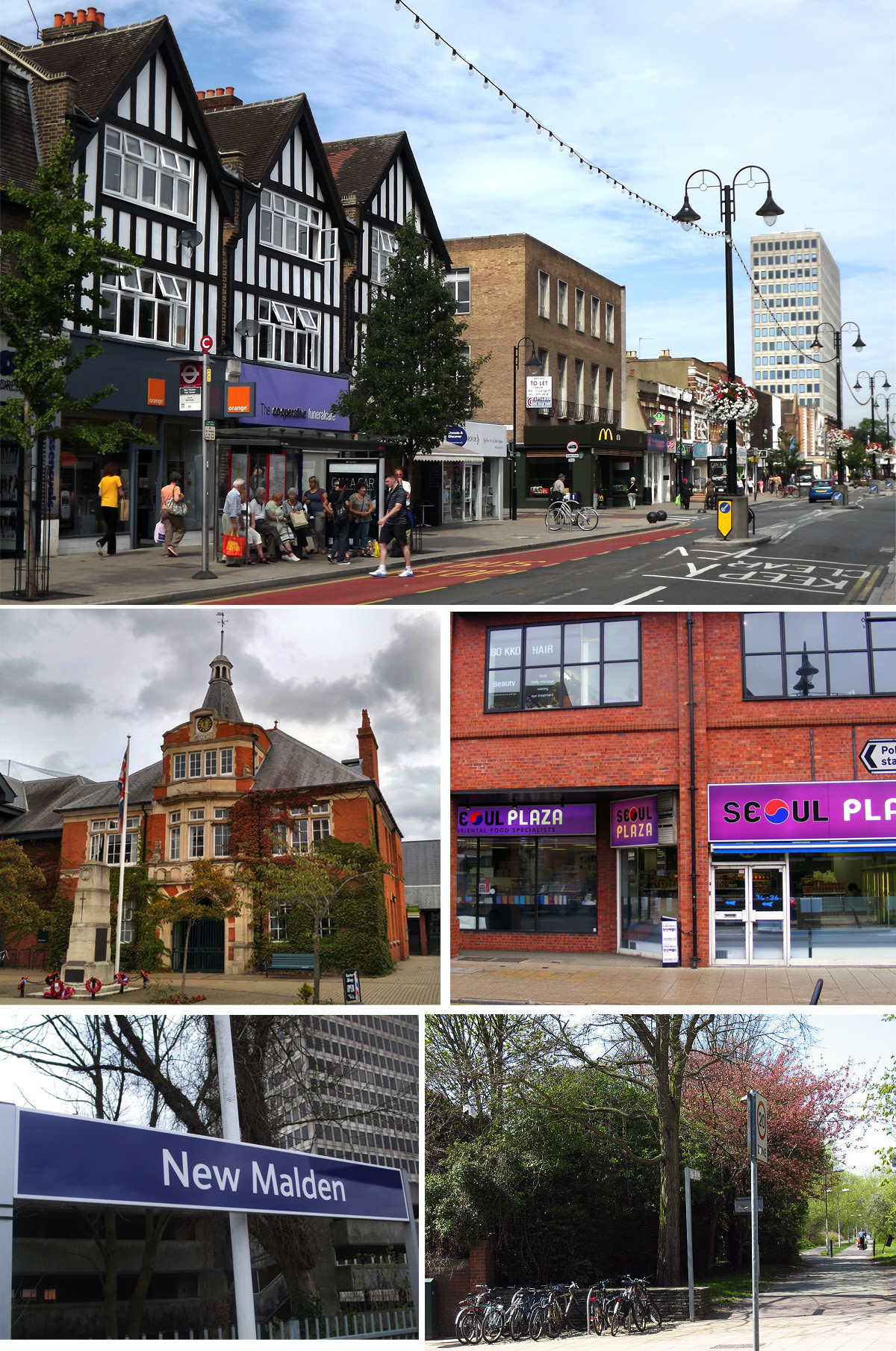
- Clockwise from top: New Malden High Street with Apex Tower in the background, a Korean supermarket, Cycleway 31 along the Cut, New Malden station and New Malden Town Hall

- Location within Greater London
- OS grid reference: TQ215685
  - Charing Cross: 9.4 mi (15.1 km) NE
- London borough: Merton; Kingston
- Ceremonial county: Greater London
- Region: London
- Country: England
- Sovereign state: United Kingdom
- Post town: NEW MALDEN
- Postcode district: KT3
- Dialling code: 020
- Police: Metropolitan
- Fire: London
- Ambulance: London
- UK Parliament: Kingston and Surbiton Wimbledon
- London Assembly: Merton and Wandsworth; South West

New Malden (/mɒl.dən/) is a suburban area in southwest London, England. It is within the Royal Borough of Kingston upon Thames and the London Borough of Merton, and is 9.4 miles (15.1 km) from Charing Cross. Neighbouring localities include Kingston, Kingston Vale, Roehampton, Norbiton, Raynes Park, Coombe, Tolworth, Motspur Park, Old Malden, and Worcester Park. Before the creation of Greater London in 1965, New Malden was in the administrative county of Surrey.

== History ==
New Malden was established as a result of the arrival of the railway. What is now New Malden railway station was opened on 1 December 1846 on the main line from London Waterloo.

Building started slowly in the area just to the north of the station, gathering pace in the late nineteenth and early twentieth centuries with two- and three-bedroom terraced houses. Further out towards Coombe Hill are larger detached and semi-detached houses built in the 1930-40s. The name of the road which leads up the hill to Coombe, Traps Lane, is thought to derive from a farm owned by a Mrs Trap. Following the opening of the Kingston bypass in 1927, the farms to its south were progressively developed for housing.

Two miles (3 km) to the south is the former village of Old Malden the origins of which are Anglo-Saxon, the name being Old English for Mæl + duna = "the cross on the hill".

In 1894 New Maldon became a civil parish, being formed from the part of the parish of Kingston upon Thames in New Malden Urban District, New Maldon was an urban district from 1894 until 1895. Under the District Councils Act 1895, The Maldens & Coombe Urban District Council was created (the plural relating to Old Malden and New Malden). In 1936 Malden and Coombe was granted full Borough status, with its own Mayor, and had the rare distinction of a civic mace bearing the royal insignia of King Edward VIII.

New Malden suffered damage from German bombing during the Second World War. The first attack took place on 16 August 1940, killing about 50 people and damaging about 1,300 homes. After dropping about 150 bombs, German aircraft reportedly flew over the railway station at low altitude and machine-gunned passengers as they disembarked from a train. Unexploded munitions from this period are still found on occasion. On 1 April 1965, the London Government Act 1963 came into force merging the boroughs of Malden & Coombe and Surbiton with Kingston upon Thames to form the Royal Borough of Kingston upon Thames, the parish of Merton was also abolished. At the 1951 census (one of the last before the abolition of the parish), New Malden had a population of 22,755.

New Malden contains offices of several large organisations, including Northrop Grumman in Burlington Road. Nestlé Purina Pet Foods (before 1998 as Spillers Pet Foods) was located in Blagdon Road until 2012 when Nestlé moved its UK head office to Gatwick.

== Description ==
New Malden is bounded to the north by the affluent Coombe and to the south and east by Raynes Park, Tolworth and Worcester Park. New Malden includes Motspur Park, home to the training ground of Fulham FC, and also the King's College London sports ground, home to the training ground of AFC Wimbledon.

- To the west: Kingston upon Thames, Norbiton
- To the south: Old Malden, Surbiton, Tolworth, Worcester Park
- To the east: Motspur Park, Raynes Park
- To the north: Coombe, Richmond Park, Wimbledon

The busy A3 trunk road runs through part of New Malden. A minor tributary of the River Thames, Beverley Brook, flows through the east of the town, while its western boundary is along the Hogsmill, another Thames tributary.

The first parking meters were made in New Malden at Venner Ltd.

== Politics ==
New Malden is mostly part of the Kingston and Surbiton constituency for elections to the House of Commons of the United Kingdom.

New Malden is part of the New Malden Village ward for elections to Kingston upon Thames London Borough Council.

== Demographics ==
=== Korean community ===
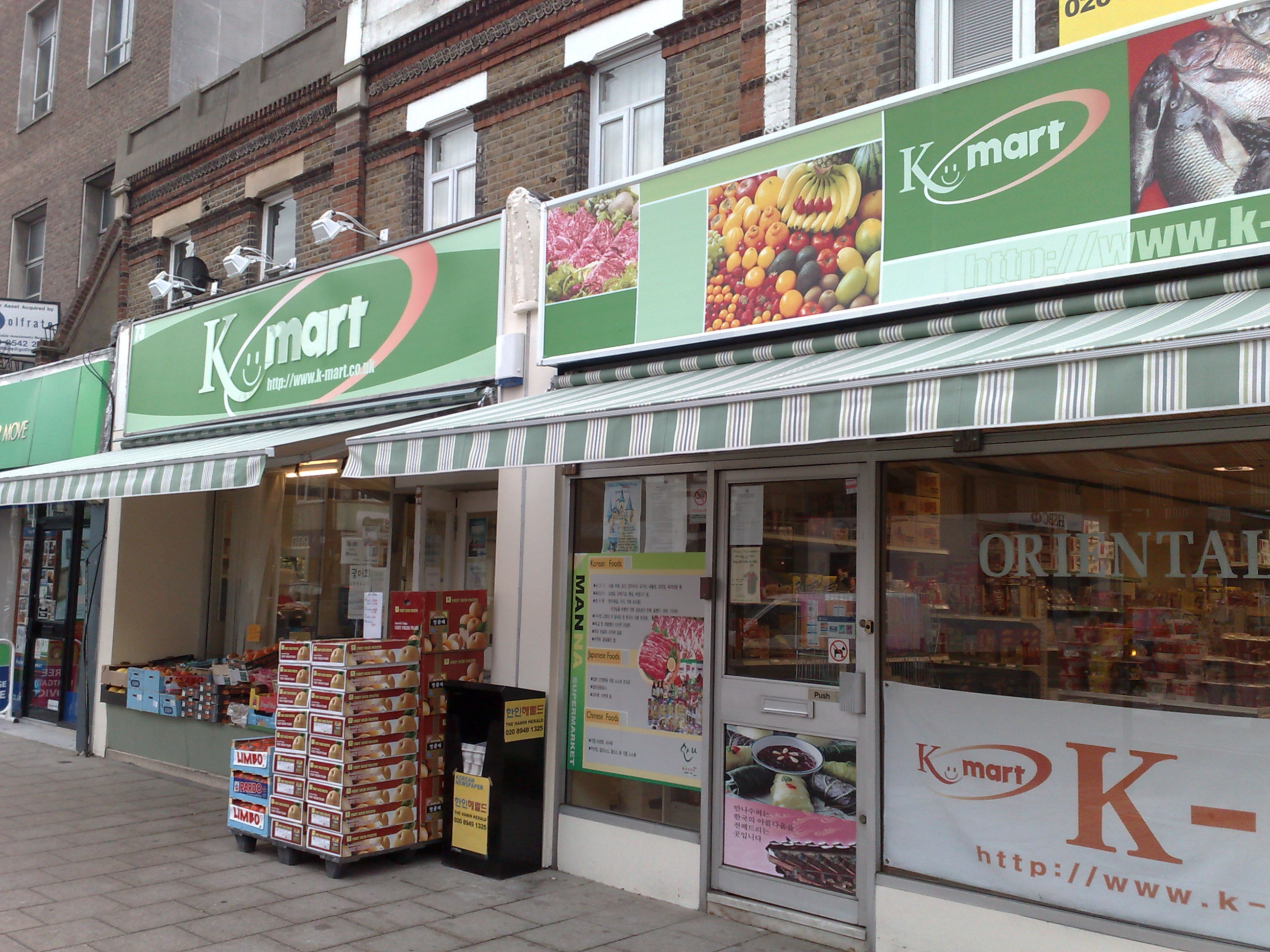
A K Mart in New Malden (2009)

The Royal Borough of Kingston upon Thames has the largest expatriate community of South Koreans in Europe. According to different sources, as of 2014 there were about 10,000 ethnic Koreans in New Malden proper, and as of the same year the Korean population in the area around New Malden is around 20,000, including about 600 originating from North Korea, giving it the largest group of North Koreans in Europe. In the 2001 census, some small areas of New Malden had "Other Asian" (i.e., not Indian, Pakistani, Bangladeshi, or Chinese) populations of "over 25%", though no whole ward reached over 20%. Many of the Koreans living in New Malden work for Korean companies, and they are either permanently settled and formerly expatriate, or they are still expatriates. According to some journalists, it is often referred as 'Korea Town' or 'Little Korea'.

The New Malden area has Korean language churches and nursery schools as well as restaurants and shops with Korean clientele. New Malden functions as the shopping and cultural centre for a Korean population spread more widely across South-West London and the neighbouring counties. The area has Korean supermarkets, about 20 Korean restaurants and cafes, including those serving bulgogi. It also has a noraebang (Karaoke bar), and many other shops. The Korean language is visible on several shop signs. The original Embassy of South Korea was in New Malden, before moving to 60 Buckingham Gate in Westminster.

Some factors cited in The Daily Telegraph as reasons why the Korean community formed in New Malden included a 1950s joint venture partnership between a chaebol and Racal Avionics (formerly Decca), Lord Chancellor's Walk in Coombe Lane West previously serving as the residence of the Ambassador of South Korea to the United Kingdom, and Samsung Electronics having its UK offices in New Malden until they moved to their current location in Chertsey, Surrey in 2005. Many Koreans settled in New Malden in the 1970s due to the ambassador's location.

=== Other ===
There is a Hindu temple in the eastern part of Burlington Road with a notable community of predominantly Sri Lankan Tamils living in the area. In 2016 New Malden gained twin city status with Jaffna, Sri Lanka and a permanent plaque was erected to celebrate this.

== Amenities ==
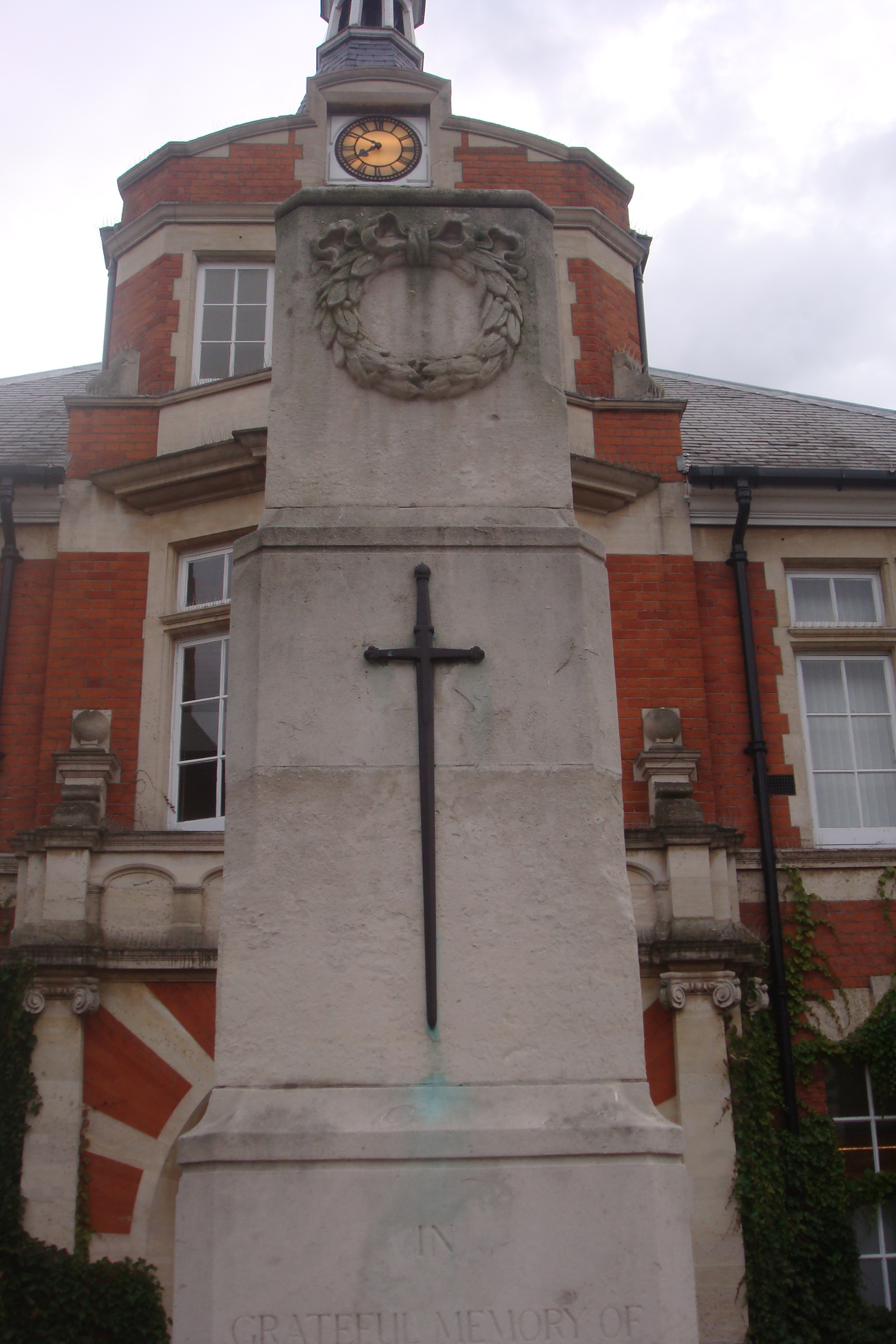
War memorial outside New Malden Town Hall

New Malden has its own sports centre, the Malden Centre, which includes a swimming pool, gym and community facilities. It also runs several adult learning courses.

Tudor Williams Ltd, established in 1913 but closed in 2019, was a family run department store in the High Street. The company also has shops in Cobham and Dorking and expanded by acquiring department stores Elphicks of Farnham in October 2004, and Knights of Reigate in September 2006. A branch of Waitrose is one of a number of other well known stores in the High Street.

Pubs in New Malden include The Glasshouse (formerly The Railway), adjacent to the train station; The Royal Oak, north of the station on Coombe Road; Woodies Freehouse on Thetford Road, and The Watchman, located at the roundabout in a building constructed in the 1890s which was originally a police station. The Fountain pub, once located at the roundabout, closed in 2018 to make way for affordable housing.

The local newspapers are the Surrey Comet which has been in print since 1854, Coombe Monthly, and the Kingston Guardian. A monthly publication, The Village Voice, covers local history, news, topical articles and advertisements for businesses serving the community.

There is an annual Malden Fortnight, which includes a parade showcasing all the local schools and community groups and various other activities.

Each Christmas the High Street is festooned with Christmas lights with its own switching-on ceremony.

New Malden has a youth theatre, the Green Theatre Company, established in 1986 in a converted cricket pavilion at Barton Green.

The area's last surviving cinema, the Odeon at Shannon Corner on the A3 was replaced by a large retail area including several large stores. The other cinema in the High Street (corner of Sussex Road) burnt down on Boxing Day 1936. There was also a silent cinema on Coombe Road by the station, which became the New Malden Gentlemen's Club in 1923; this closed in August 2010, and is now a Korean karaoke and pool bar.

New Malden also has its own "Dino-Golf" course, 18 holes of dinosaur themed crazy golf overlooking the A3, as well as a floodlit golf driving range.

Large B&Q, Currys and Tesco stores are situated away from the High Street, which focuses more on smaller, more upmarket shops and restaurants.

New Malden is home to the playing fields of both King's College London and the London School of Economics, which are available for hire when not in use by university teams.

== Notable open spaces ==
- Beverley Park provides a football pitch, tennis courts, children's playground, allotments and open space.
- Blagdon Open Space
- Dickerage Recreation Ground
- Green Lane Recreation Ground
- Malden Golf Club, situated between Coombe Lane and Traps Lane, was established at its present site in 1926.
- Wimbledon Common and Richmond Park are within easy reach of New Malden.

== Education and schools ==
- Burlington (primary and nursery)
- Christ Church New Malden (primary and nursery, Church of England)
- Coombe Boys' School (secondary; "Beverley" prior to 2006; coeducational sixth form)
- Coombe Girls' School (secondary; coeducational sixth form)
- Coombe Hill Junior School (primary)
- Corpus Christi (primary and nursery, Roman Catholic)
- Holy Cross (secondary, Roman Catholic School)
- King's Oak (primary and nursery; formerly "The Mount")
- Malden Manor (primary and nursery)
- Richard Challoner (secondary, Roman Catholic)
- Sacred Heart (primary)
- Study School (primary)

== Transport ==
=== Rail ===
New Malden railway station has services provided by South Western Railway to London Waterloo, Hampton Court, Kingston, Richmond and Shepperton. It is in London Zone 4. The Old Malden area is well served by trains from Malden Manor railway station, travelling north to London Waterloo and south to Chessington. Motspur Park railway station on the New Malden/Raynes Park borders also has rail connections to Chessington South, Epsom, Leatherhead and Dorking.

=== Bus ===
There are many routes of London Buses going through New Malden, including route 213 route going from Kingston towards Sutton, routes 131 and N87 going through Kingston Town Centre and Tooting Broadway (and Aldwych for the night bus) along with the SL7 express bus to Croydon and Heathrow Airport, route 152 from New Malden towards Pollards Hill and route 265 towards Tolworth, Roehampton and Putney. The town also has a series of local bus routes, including K1 which goes to Kingston and New Malden station and K5 to Ham and Morden.

== Notable residents ==
Notable former or current residents include:

- Cyril Barton – posthumously awarded the Victoria Cross during World War II
- Ian Bazalgette – posthumously awarded the Victoria Cross during World War II
- Tracy Borman, historian and author
- Bernard Braden – TV personality, popular during the 1960s and early 1970s
- Jane Campbell, Baroness Campbell of Surbiton – British peer and Commissioner of the Equality and Human Rights Commission
- Anthony Caro, sculptor, was born in New Malden in 1924.
- Vernon Corea – Sri Lankan TV pioneer
- Etheline E. Dell - artist
- Paul Geraghty – author/illustrator
- Tom Holland – actor
- Barbara Kelly – TV personality
- David Kynaston – author, historian
- Jaden Ladega – actor, attended high school in New Malden
- John Martyn (1948–2009) – singer-songwriter, was born in New Malden.
- Sally Morgan – celebrity psychic medium
- Jamal Musiala – footballer, attended Corpus Christi RC Primary School in New Malden.
- Cyril Power – artist
- Diana Rigg – actress
- Luke Sital-Singh – singer-songwriter
- Colin Southgate – businessman
- Stormzy – rapper, singer and songwriter
- Max Wall – actor, comedian and entertainer
- Eileen Way, actress and activist, was born in New Malden.
- Jamie Woon – singer-songwriter
- Lee Sullivan – drummer
- Declan Rice - footballer

== Sports ==
=== Cricket ===
- Malden Wanderers Cricket Club (1879)
- Kingstonian Cricket Club (1989)

== See also ==
- Koreatown, Los Angeles
- Spring Branch, Houston, the centre of the Korean community in Houston, Texas
- Oseyo-H Mart
