= James Giles (British politician) =

British politician (born 2000)

Leader of the Opposition on Kingston upon Thames Council
- Incumbent
- Assumed office 20 November 2023

Leader of the Kingston Independent Residents Group
- Incumbent
- Assumed office 5 May 2022
- Preceded by: Helen Hinton

Member of Kingston upon Thames London Borough Council
- Incumbent
- Assumed office 5 May 2022
- Ward: Green Lane and St James Ward
- Preceded by: Seat created

Personal details
- Born: New Malden, London, United Kingdom
- Party: Kingston Independent Residents Group (2017-); Workers Party of Britain (2024); Your Party (2025)

James Giles is a British political advisor, activist and local councillor. He is the leader of the Kingston Independent Residents Group (KIRG) political party in England and has been involved in the establishment of Your Party.

== Career ==
=== Education, journalism and political campaigning ===
Giles was born and grew up with his mother on a council estate in the London suburb of New Malden. In 2008, when attending Burlington Junior School, he founded the student newsletter Burlington Weekly, subsequently expanded to cover extramural news as Weekly Express.

On enrolling at Coombe Boys' School he launched the Coombe Monthly, which grew into a newspaper with its own website. Its Twitter audience included the Kingston and Surbiton MP Ed Davey and a number of the borough councillors. In 2014, he edited an issue on fracking, and interviewed the Kingston Council leader Kevin Davis (Conservative) for another issue. In the same year, he helped his grandmother, the local ex-deputy postmistress Yvonne Tracey, lead a successful campaign against plans to cut staff at the New Malden post office. The Coombe Monthly was later renamed as the Kingston Enquirer. In 2018, Giles challenged Davis in a public council meeting about a conflict of interests relating to his family, sparking a minor media scandal. In 2019, he criticised what he perceived to be an attempt by Kingston Council’s administration to limit the influence of residents on council decision-making, which originated in the Local Government Association's report that "a small group of campaigners is greatly overrepresented at meetings".

He studied politics at Royal Holloway, University of London as of 2019.

Giles was a guest and a host of George Galloway's programme The Mother of All Talk Shows on Radio Sputnik in 2020. For 6 weeks in 2021, he co-hosted Galloway's Sputnik: Orbiting the World show on RT UK.

=== Local government ===
Giles chaired the campaign group Malden Independent Community Organisation (MICO) between 2016 and 2021. He co-founded the Kingston Independent Residents Group (KIRG) English political party in February 2017. New Malden's former deputy mayor. After serving as the KIRG's deputy leader in 2019, he became the party leader by May 2022. He has been a councillor for Green Lane & St James' since 5 May 2022 election and leads The Opposition Group / Kingston Independent Residents Group (KIRG) in the Borough Council.

While managing the successful campaign of his grandmother, Yvonne Tracey, on a KIRG ticket in the Kingston Borough Council by-election in November 2022, he produced a controversial leaflet accusing the Muslim Ahmadiyya community, to which Tracey's rival Mahmood Rafiq belonged, of propagating homophobia. He was investigated by the police over alleged hate crime against the Ahmadiyya, which is denounced as non-Muslim by some Muslim groups, but no charges were brought.

In November 2023, he was suspended from his position as a member of the Community Wellbeing Board of the Local Government Association (LGA) after circulating a petition for a ceasefire in the Gaza war, which stated that the names of councillors who did not sign would be published "in the interest of accountability". This was criticised by several councillors as being threatening or intimidating. Giles was cleared of 'threatening behaviour', 'bullying' or 'harassment' in an independent investigation report commissioned by Kingston Council, and has taken up new roles with the LGA since.

=== Public relations and business ===
He has been a director of New Malden Markets Ltd since 2024.

=== National politics ===
Giles stood as an independent candidate in the 2019 general election in Kingston and Surbiton. He was reported to be London's youngest candidate and the youngest independent candidate in the country's history. He received 458 votes (0.8 %).

In June 2021, he was the campaign manager for the Workers Party of Britain candidate George Galloway in the Batley and Spen by-election. He threatened a legal challenge against the election result.

In February 2024, he managed Galloway's successful campaign in the Rochdale by-election following the death of Labour's Tony Lloyd. At that time, he claimed that his political consultancy work was separate from his personal politics, and was not a member of the Workers Party. However, by March 2024, he was reported to be helping Galloway launch a national movement based on the Workers Party.

In the 2024 general election, Giles stood as the Workers Party candidate for Birmingham Hodge Hill and Solihull North on a pro-Palestinian platform, coming second with 27% of the vote and losing by 1,500 votes to Liam Byrne of the Labour Party. He also oversaw Yvonne Tracey's single-issue campaign in Kingston and Surbiton.

Following the election, in July 2024, Giles became chief of staff to Ayoub Khan, the independent MP for Birmingham Perry Barr and was hired as adviser by the other elected independent MPs supporting the Palestinian cause: Shockat Adam, Adnan Hussain and Iqbal Mohamed, all of whom subsequently formed the Independent Alliance with Jeremy Corbyn. He deputised for Khan at the Local Government Association's Independent Group Annual Conference in January 2025. He was a voting member of the organising committee that launched 'Your Party' in July 2025 and worked on the committee's volunteer 'ops team' as an electoral law adviser. Giles was excluded from the first Your Party conference amid an alleged factional dispute between Jeremy Corbyn and Zarah Sultana, the party's co-founders. Sources said Sultana was told he was barred over a "private matter" linked to an ongoing Information Commissioner's Office (ICO) inquiry. Giles, denying any contact with the ICO, said that Karie Murphy, Corbyn's former chief of staff, was behind the decision. Sultana then boycotted the conference in protest, expressly citing the expulsion of Giles as her reason.

== Views ==
Giles described his political beliefs as "localist" in early 2024. His 2019 election campaign for the British parliament was characterised as "hyper-local" and criticised previous MPs for their loyalty to their party over their constituency.

He opposed the reduction of the voting age to 16 in the United Kingdom as of 2019, citing concerns over the influence of fake news and social media, and advocated the teaching of government and politics in secondary schools instead.

== Personal life ==
Giles has referred to himself as "Kingston's only openly gay councillor".
