= Richmond upon Thames School =

The Richmond upon Thames School (RTS)

Location
- Egerton Road; Twickenham, Greater London, TW2 7SJ; England; 51.45116°N 0.34088°W

Information
- Type: Free School
- Motto: Excellence Through Endeavour
- Established: 2017
- Department for Education URN: 143022 Tables
- Ofsted: Reports
- Headteacher: Kelly Dooley
- Gender: Coeducational
- Age: 11 to 16 (18 for Sixth Form Plus)
- Website: http://www.richmonduponthamesschool.org.uk/

The Richmond upon Thames School (RTS), is a co-educational secondary academy, located in Twickenham in the London Borough of Richmond.

It was established under the Department for Education's Free School policy in September 2017, and is part of a Richmond Education and Enterprise Campus (REEC) being created at the site of Richmond upon Thames College (RUTC).

RTS is governed by the Richmond upon Thames School Trust, a partnership between Achieving for Children, Harlequins Rugby Club, Haymarket Media Group, Richmond Council and Richmond upon Thames College.

Although RTS is formally an 11-16 school, it offers 16+ qualifications in partnership with Richmond Upon Thames College, known as Sixth Form Plus, giving its teachers the opportunity to teach their subjects at A Level.

== Performance ==
Like all English schools, RTS' population and performance data are published in the Department for Education's national tables.

== Houses ==
RTS has six houses, named after notable historical figures:

- Anderson (represented by red, abbreviated to AN)
- Berners-Lee (represented by dark blue, abbreviated to BL)
- Madiba (represented by green, abbreviated to MA)
- Shakespeare (represented by orange, abbreviated to SE)
- Stoop (represented by light blue, abbreviated to SP)
- Lovelace (represented by purple, abbreviated to LE)

=== Lovelace ===
Lovelace house is the newest house. Whilst every other house has been active since the school's beginning, Lovelace was founded in September 2024. Its first students are the class of 29 (2024-29).
