= Teddington Pools and Fitness Centre =

Sports centre in London, England

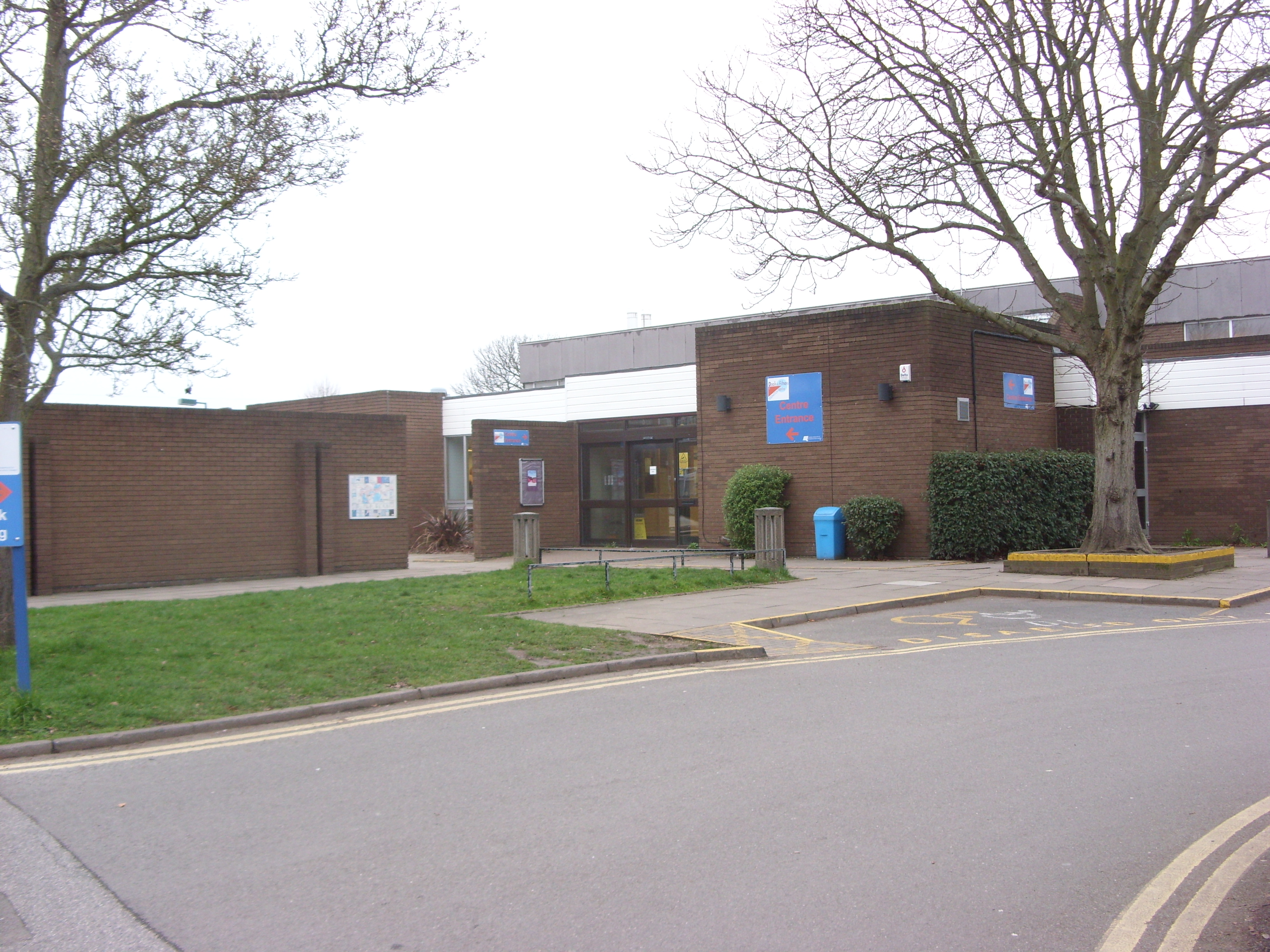
- Interactive map of Teddington Pools and Fitness Centre
- Former names: Teddington Lido, Teddington Pool
- Location: Teddington Pools and Fitness Centre, Vicarage Road, Teddington, TW11 8EZ
- Coordinates: 51.4281°N 0.3313°W
- Owner: Richmond Council
- Operator: Richmond Council
- Type: heated indoor
- Facilities: parking, gym, adjacent recreation ground
- Dimensions: Length: 25 metres (82 ft); Width: 13 metres (43 ft); Depth: 2 metres (6.6 ft)

Construction
- Opened: 1931
- Architect: H C Hunt

Website
- www.richmond.gov.uk/teddington_pools_fitness_centre

Teddington Pools and Fitness Centre is a public swimming pool and fitness centre owned and operated by the London Borough of Richmond upon Thames located in Vicarage Road, off the A313, in Teddington.

Originally built as a lido pool in 1931, it was closed in 1976 and rebuilt as an indoor facility in 1978.

The building includes a six-lane 25 metre pool, a learner pool, and a 9.5 metres (10.4 yd) by 5 metres (5.5 yd) deck level hydrotherapy pool. Other facilities include a gym and studio space.

Since its original construction in 1931, the pool has been home to Richmond Swimming Club, who continue to use the facility. After the pool was rebuilt, Teddington Swimming Club was formed and continue to use it as a base. Teddington Sub Aqua Club also use the pool.

== Transport ==
Teddington Pools and Fitness Centre has a pay and display car park and is served by London Buses route 281, 285 and R68. London Buses route 33 and SL7 also stop nearby. Teddington railway station is located 500 metres (550 yd) to the south west.

== In popular culture ==
The centre was featured in the Rainbow episode Going Swimming (1983).
