= Chessington branch line =

Railway line in the UK in SW London

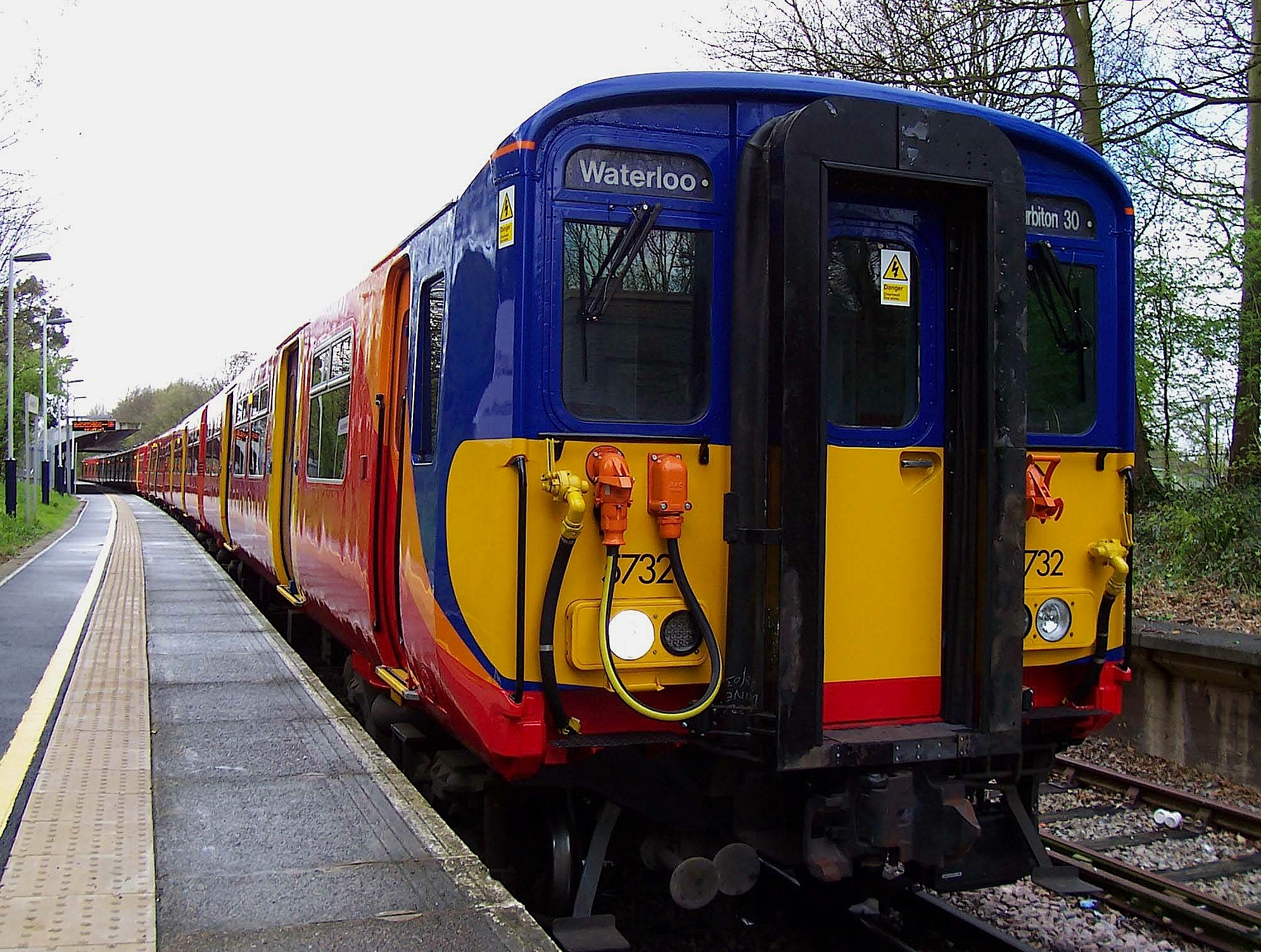
- Class 455 at Chessington South

Overview
- Status: Operational
- Owner: Network Rail
- Locale: Greater London
- Termini: Motspur Park; Chessington South
- Stations: 4

Service
- Type: Suburban rail
- System: National Rail
- Operator: South Western Railway
- Depot: Wimbledon
- Rolling stock: British Rail Class 450; British Rail Class 701

History
- Opened: 1938–1939

Technical
- Number of tracks: 2
- Character: Suburban branch
- Track gauge: 4 ft 8 1/2 in (1,435 mm) standard gauge
- Electrification: Third rail, 750 V DC
- Operating speed: 60 mph (97 km/h)
Route map
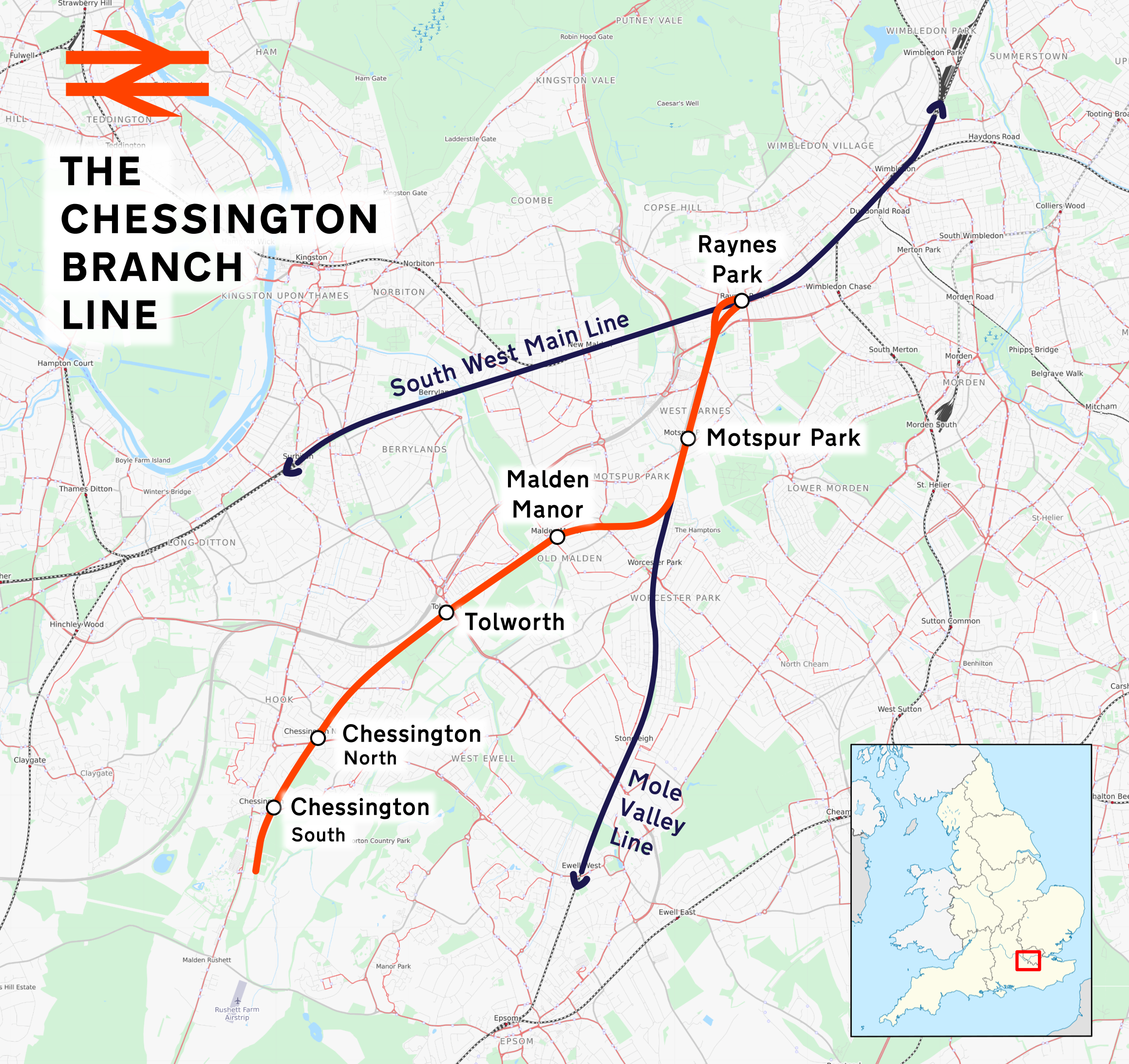
(Click to expand)

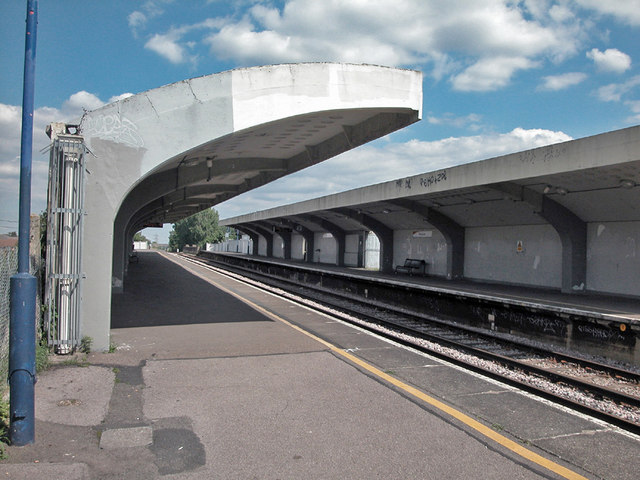
Concrete platform canopy at Tolworth railway station

The Chessington branch line is a short National Rail railway line in England, mostly in the Royal Borough of Kingston upon Thames, from Motspur Park to Chessington South.

== History ==
The branch was intended as a secondary main line to relieve congestion from Leatherhead to Motspur Park, and was thus built as electrified double track from the start. However, the line only got to Chessington before green belt legislation put a stop to completing the line.

The line was the last line built by the Southern Railway. It was to serve the housing, industrial, engineering and storage developments south of Surbiton.

It was opened on 29 May 1938 from Motspur Park to Tolworth, with an intermediate station at Malden Manor, and extended on 28 May 1939 to Chessington North and Chessington South.

All the stations on the line were of concrete in an Art Deco style, typical of the period.

Work to extend beyond Chessington was halted by the outbreak of World War II, with track laid beyond Chessington South as far as Chalky Lane, and preparatory works continuing further south. This included an embankment built by the Royal Engineers as a military exercise from Chalky Lane as far south as Chessington Wood, close to where the next station at Malden Rushett would have been built. A second station to serve Ashtead, namely at its northern extreme, was also planned. After the war green belt legislation put a stop to any resumption because Ashtead Common was given protected status. A goods yard south of Chessington South was used as a coal concentration depot from the mid-1960s to the end of the 1980s. The goods yard and the 0.5 miles (0.80 km) of trackbed towards Malden Rushett are overgrown by trees. Two platforms were built at Chessington South but since the extension south was never built only one platform has ever been in public use.

It was originally intended to name Chessington North station Chessington Court and Chessington South station Chessington Grange.

The line was mainly constructed on embankment with short distances in cuttings and several bridges. A 140-foot (43 m) viaduct crosses the Hogsmill River near Malden Manor.

Demand and population in the area increased after the railway's relatively late introduction. Malden Manor station is the line's busiest with 0.60 million journeys made in the 2014-2015 financial year. Its recorded use was 0.58 million ten years before. The total of journeys per year of the four stations on the line has reached 2.219 million recorded journeys. Malden Manor station has formally been assigned E (small staffed) status as its station category.
