= Chessington North railway station =

National Rail station in London, England

Chessington North
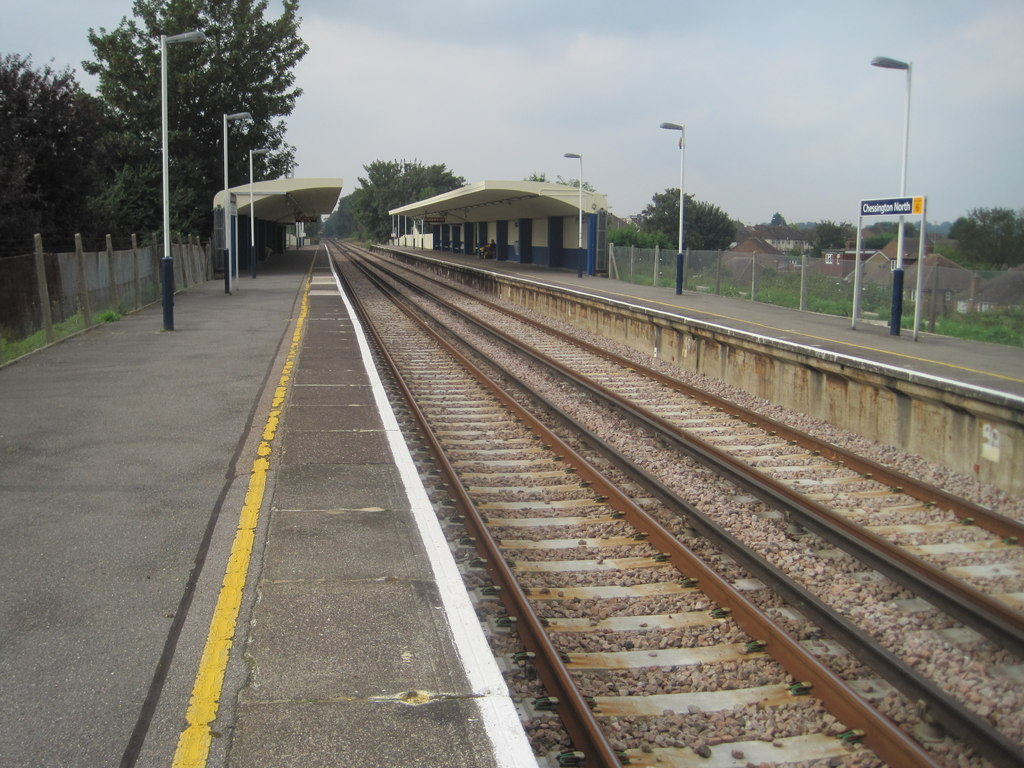
- Chessington North railway station in September 2014
- Interactive map of Chessington North

General information
- Location: Chessington
- Local authority: Royal Borough of Kingston upon Thames
- Managed by: South Western Railway
- Station code: CSN
- DfT category: D
- Number of platforms: 2
- Fare zone: 6

National Rail annual entry and exit
- 2020–21: ▼0.128 million
- 2021–22: ▲0.317 million
- 2022–23: ▲0.377 million
- 2023–24: ▲0.459 million
- 2024–25: ▲0.489 million

Railway companies
- Original company: Southern Railway

Key dates
- 28 May 1939: Opened

Other information
- External links: Departures; Facilities
- Coordinates: 51.3642°N 0.3005°W

Chessington North railway station, in the Royal Borough of Kingston upon Thames in South West London, is on the Chessington branch line and is served by South Western Railway. The station serves Hook as well as the northern part of Chessington. It is 13 miles 25 chains (21.4 km) down the line from London Waterloo; it is in London fare zone 6.

== History ==
Like all others on the branch, the station is built in the concrete Art Deco style of the 1930s. It was designed by the architect James Robb Scott, and it opened on 28 May 1939. By rail, Chessington North is 13.31 mi (21.42 km) from London Waterloo.

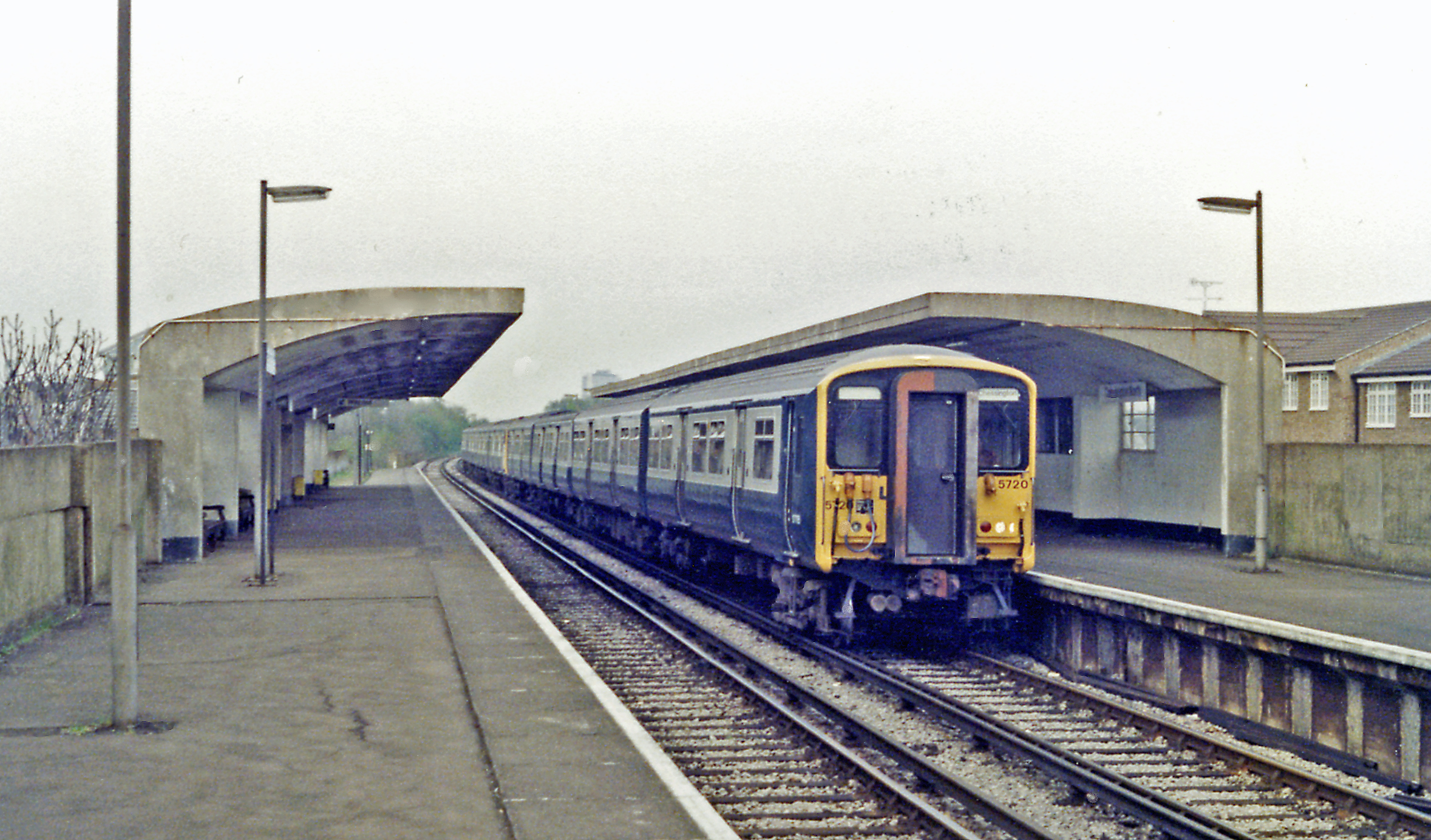
Class 455 in 1985. Note the distinctive art deco canopies that were standard along this line.

== Services ==
All services at Chessington North are operated by South Western Railway.

The typical service on all days of the week is two trains per hour in each direction between London Waterloo and Chessington South.

Preceding station	National Rail	Following station
Tolworth	South Western Railway Chessington Branch Line	Chessington South

== Connections ==
London Buses route 71 and night route N65 serve the station.
