= James Robb Scott =

Scottish architect

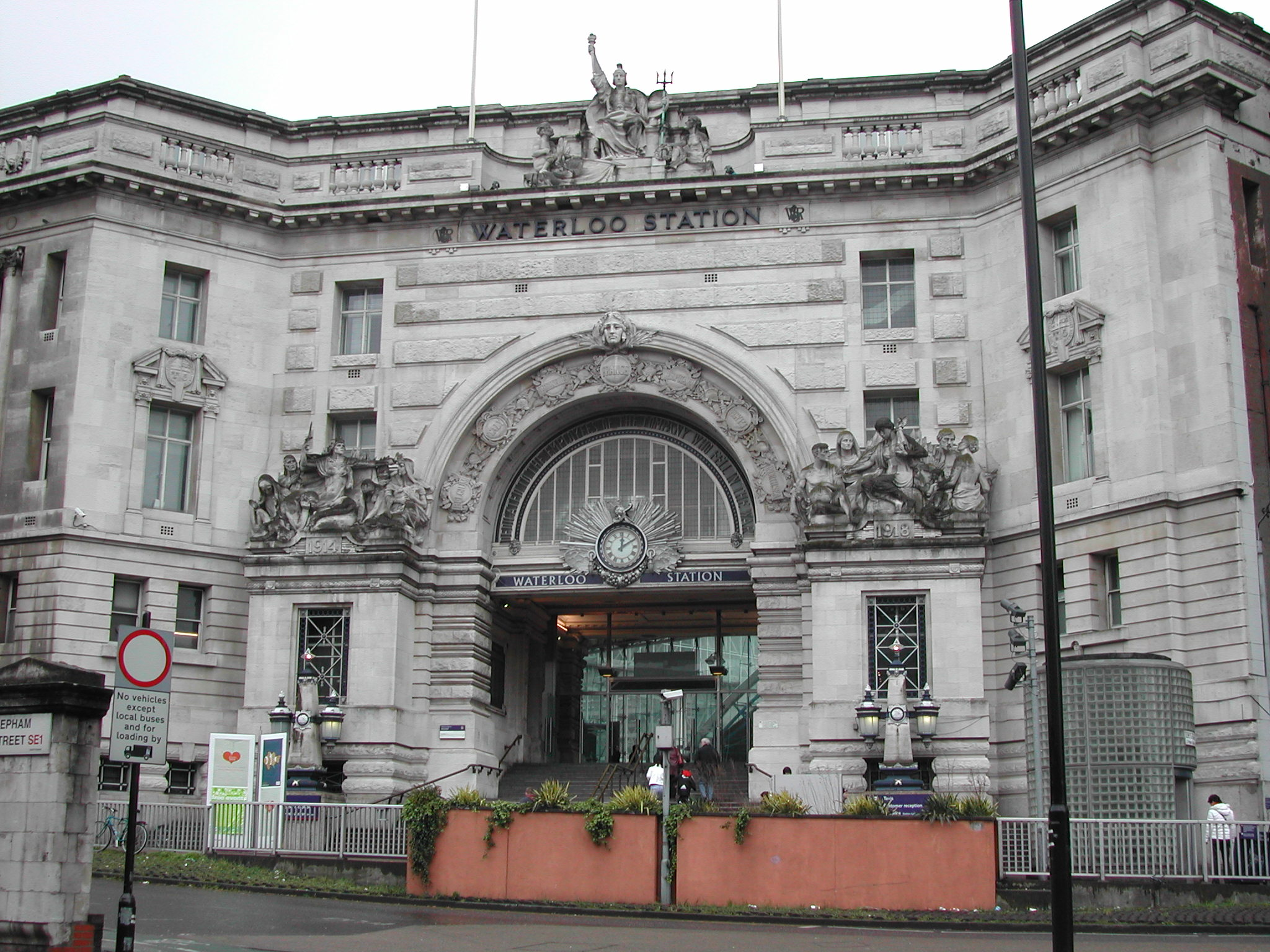
Victory Arch at Waterloo station. Scott's most famous work

James Robb Scott (11 February 1882 – 1965) was a Scottish architect who became the Chief Architect of the Southern Railway.

He was born on 11 February 1882 in the Gorbals, Glasgow, the son of Andrew Robb Scott (architect) and Mary Fletcher. He was articled to Leadbetter and Fairley in Edinburgh and afterwards moved to Belcher and Joass in London where he was promoted to chief architectural assistant.

He joined the London and South Western Railway in 1907. He is noted as the chief architectural assistant in the period of the reconstruction of Waterloo Station between 1909 and 1923. The engineers John Wykeham Jacomb-Hood and Alfred Weeks Szlumper had designed the roof and platforms. Scott was responsible for the office range and the main entrance and war memorial to the fallen employees of the Railway known as the Victory Arch. Sometime early in the evolution of the Southern Railway he was appointed chief architect.

He died in 1965.

== Works ==
- Waterloo railway station offices and Victory Arch
- Ramsgate railway station 1925
- Bromley North railway station 1925
- Byfleet and New Haw railway station 1927
- Dumpton Park railway station 1928
- Exmouth railway station 1929
- Wimbledon railway station 1930
- Wimbledon Chase railway station 1930
- Hastings railway station 1931
- Bishopstone railway station 1936
- Durrington-on-Sea railway station 1937
- Surbiton railway station 1937
- Richmond railway station 1938
- Malden Manor railway station 1938
- Tolworth railway station 1938
- Horsham railway station 1938
- Chessington North railway station 1939
- Chessington South railway station 1939
