= Green Lane and St James =

- Electoral ward for the Kingston upon Thames London Borough Council
- Green Lane and St James ward boundaries since 2022
- Borough: Kingston upon Thames
- County: Greater London
- Population: 7,051 (2021) (Note: 2021 Census data reported for 2022 ward boundaries)
- Electorate: 4,643 (2022)
- Area: 1.306 square kilometres (0.504 sq mi)

Current electoral ward
- Created: 2022
- Number of members: 2
- Councillors: James Giles; Yvonne Tracey
- Created from: Beverley, St James
- GSS code: E05013934

Green Lane and St James is an electoral ward in the Royal Borough of Kingston upon Thames. The ward was first used in the 2022 elections. It returns two councillors to Kingston upon Thames London Borough Council.

== List of councillors ==
Term	Councillor	Party
2022–2022	Tim Cobbett	Liberal Democrats
2022–present	James Giles	KIRG
2022–present	Yvonne Tracey	KIRG

== Kingston upon Thames council elections ==
=== 2022 by-election ===
The by-election was held on 10 November 2022, following the resignation of Tim Cobbett.

2022 Green Lane and St James by-election
Party	Candidate	Votes	%	±%
KIRG	Yvonne Tracey	855	46.3	
Liberal Democrats	Mahmood Rafiq	647	35.1	
Labour	Nick Draper	265	14.4	
Conservative	Suniya Qureshi	78	4.2	
Turnout		1,845	40.0	
KIRG gain from Liberal Democrats		Swing		

=== 2022 election ===
The election took place on 5 May 2022.

2022 Kingston upon Thames London Borough Council election: Green Lane and St James
Party	Candidate	Votes	%	±%
Liberal Democrats	Tim Cobbett	888	39.8	
KIRG	James Giles	853	38.2	
Liberal Democrats	Simon Edwards	845	37.8	
KIRG	Yvonne Tracey	757	33.9	
Conservative	David Condry	288	12.9	
Labour	Gerry Jones	253	11.3	
Conservative	Suniya Qureshi	240	10.7	
Labour	Gary See	216	9.7	
Total votes		4,340		
Turnout		2233	48.1	
Liberal Democrats win (new seat)				
KIRG win (new seat)				
