= Kingstonian Cricket Club =

Kingstonian Cricket Club is a member club of the Surrey Championship and the Surrey Cricket League, and is based at the King's College sportsground in New Malden, Surrey. The club is registered as an ECB Clubmark accredited club.

The club currently hosts 6 Saturday teams, 2 T20 sides and a Sunday XI. These teams, along with the Sunday side, have enabled over 170 players to represent the club in 2019.

== History ==
The club was formed in 1989, initially under the name Pearl 1990, and was subsequently renamed to Kingstonian in 1995.

Geoff Phillips, one of the founding members of Kingstonian Cricket Club, led the way in creating the new club from the former Pearl Assurance club and negotiating with Kings College to keep the team at Windsor Avenue. Although he last played for the club in 2009, he continued to be the driving force behind the club, managing finances as the Club treasurer, holding numerous club offices and liaising with Kings College to allow the club to continue to use their ground. It was Geoff's drive, energy and enthusiasm that enabled the club to expand and to join the Surrey Fullers league. For many years, Geoff gave up his Saturday and Sunday afternoons to help at the cricket ground, including preparing teas for home games, manning the bar, even providing a taxi service to get players to and from games. These efforts helped the club save thousands of pounds which enabled the club to purchase items like mobile covers, a bowling machine and a portable cage. Geoff Phillips died in November 2019.

== 2016 ==
2016 was a Breakthrough year for the club as it set up its first ever colts section (Please see section on Coaching Children's Cricket for more details). The club's 1st XI, led by Amir Hussain, won the Surrey Championship Division 4 1st XI that very year, achieving a promotion to Division 3 1st XI. The club used more than 150 players during the 2016 season making them one of the largest clubs in Surrey.

== 2019 ==
The club's 4th XI, led by Vivek Subramanyam, won the Surrey Championship West Division 4 4th XI, achieving a promotion to West Division 3. The club's T20 XI, led by Milan Patra and Madhav Singh brought home the Surrey Slam Plate. In the very same year, the club's 3rd XI, led by Dhruv Singh, came Runners up and achieved promotion to West Division 2 3rd XI.

== Coaching Children's Cricket ==
The club is proud to host more than 10 Level 2 Cricket Coaches certified in Coaching Children's Cricket. The cohort of Level 2 coaches includes Prathamesh Kaneri who was recognised for his efforts at a National level at the ECB Coaching Awards in Edgbaston.

The club opened its first ever junior section in 2016, for ages 5 to 11 successfully attracting more than 40 youngsters from the local area. In 2017, plans were laid out to expand this age range and introduce the juniors to hard ball cricket where possible. The colts section numbers currently stand at over 110 as of 2019.
