= Tolworth railway station =

National Rail station in London, England

Tolworth
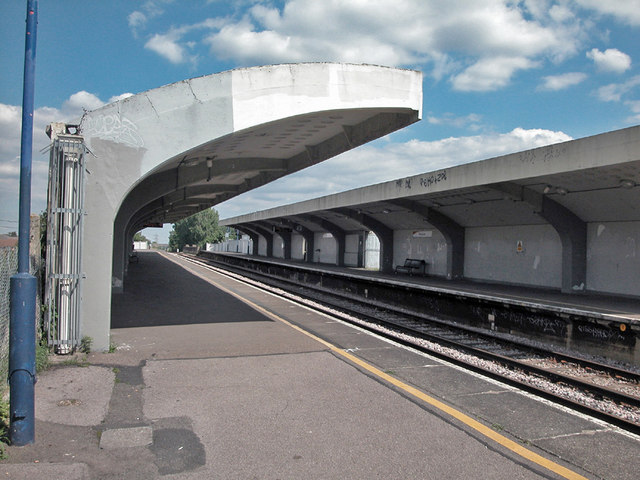
- Interactive map of Tolworth

General information
- Location: Tolworth
- Local authority: Royal Borough of Kingston upon Thames
- Managed by: South Western Railway
- Station code: TOL
- DfT category: E
- Number of platforms: 2
- Fare zone: 5

National Rail annual entry and exit
- 2020–21: ▼0.156 million
- 2021–22: ▲0.385 million
- 2022–23: ▲0.496 million
- 2023–24: ▲0.528 million
- 2024–25: ▲0.576 million

Railway companies
- Original company: Southern Railway

Key dates
- 29 May 1938: Opened (Terminus)
- 28 May 1939: Through station

Other information
- External links: Departures; Facilities
- Coordinates: 51.3768°N 0.2794°W

Tolworth railway station, in the Royal Borough of Kingston upon Thames in south London, is a station on the Chessington Branch Line, 12 miles 6 chains (19.4 km) down the line from London Waterloo. The station is part of the London suburban network of South Western Railway and is in London fare zone 5.

The station, like all others on the branch, is built in the art deco style of the 1930s using concrete arcs for canopies; it was opened, as the original terminus of the branch, on 29 May 1938. Station buildings are below at street level on the Kingston Road. The original goods depot is now partly a freight depot operated by DB Cargo UK. The remaining area of the site is operated by London United as a bus depot.

== Services ==
All services at Tolworth are operated by South Western Railway.

The typical service on all days of the week is two trains per hour in each direction between London Waterloo and Chessington South.

Preceding station	National Rail	Following station
Malden Manor	South Western Railway Chessington Branch Line	Chessington North

== Connections ==
London Buses routes 265, 281, 406, 418, K1 and K2 serve the station.
