= Malden Manor railway station =

National Rail station in London, England

Malden Manor
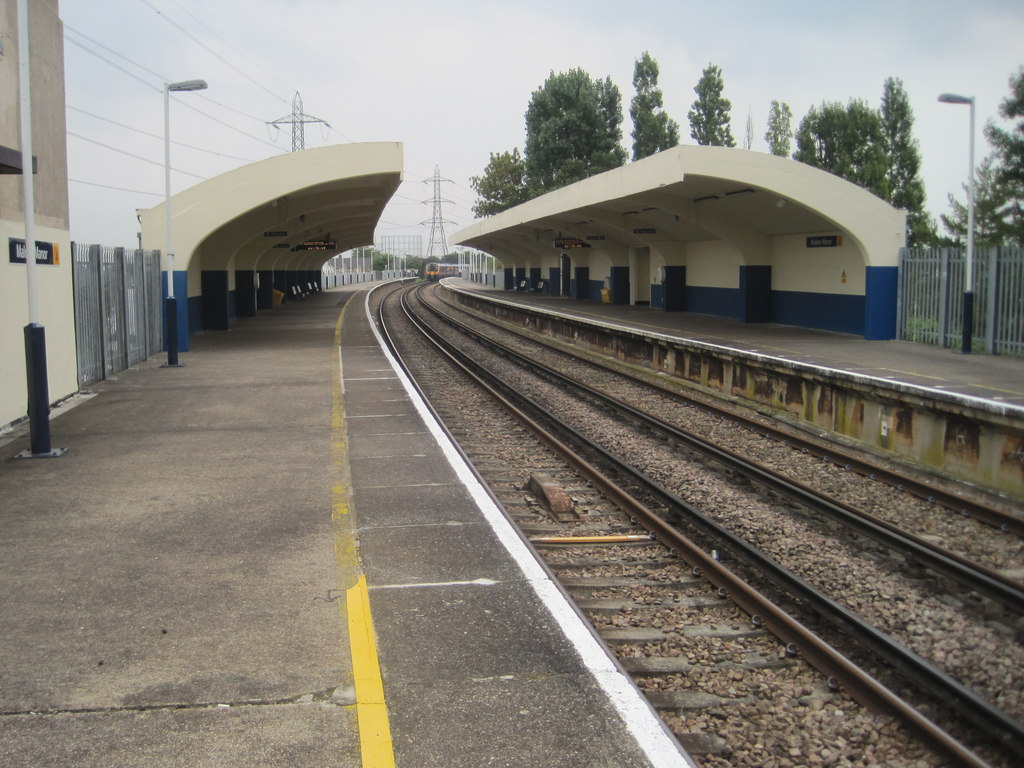
- Interactive map of Malden Manor

General information
- Location: Old Malden
- Local authority: Royal Borough of Kingston upon Thames
- Managed by: South Western Railway
- Station code: MAL
- DfT category: E
- Number of platforms: 2
- Fare zone: 4

National Rail annual entry and exit
- 2021–22: ▲0.311 million
- 2022–23: ▲0.379 million
- 2023–24: ▲0.454 million
- 2024–25: ▲0.484 million
- 2025–26: ▲0.506 million

Railway companies
- Original company: Southern Railway

Key dates
- 29 May 1938: Opened
- 8 May 2014: Platforms extended

Other information
- External links: Departures; Facilities
- Coordinates: 51.385°N 0.261°W

Malden Manor railway station, in the Royal Borough of Kingston upon Thames in south London is one of the stations on the Chessington Branch Line, part of the London suburban network of South Western Railway, and is in London fare zone 4. It is 11 miles 5 chains (17.8 km) down the line from London Waterloo.

Like all others on the branch, the station is built in the concrete style of the 1930s (see external link); it was designed by James Robb Scott and opened on 29 May 1938. South-west of the station is a three-span, 140 ft (42m) viaduct over the Hogsmill River, a tributary of the River Thames.

Both platforms were extended to take ten-coach trains on 8 May 2014.

== Services ==
All services at Malden Manor are operated by South Western Railway.

The typical service on all days of the week is two trains per hour in each direction between London Waterloo and Chessington South.

Preceding station	National Rail	Following station
Motspur Park	South Western Railway Chessington Branch Line	Tolworth

== Connections ==
London Buses routes K1 and S3 serve the station.
