= Coombe Boys' School =

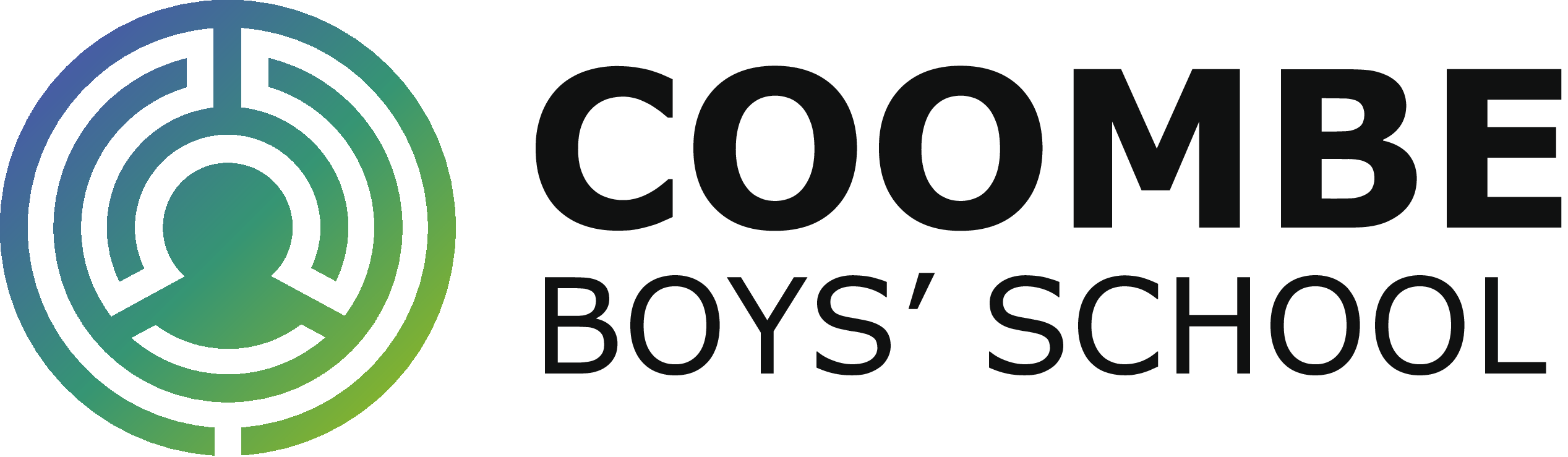

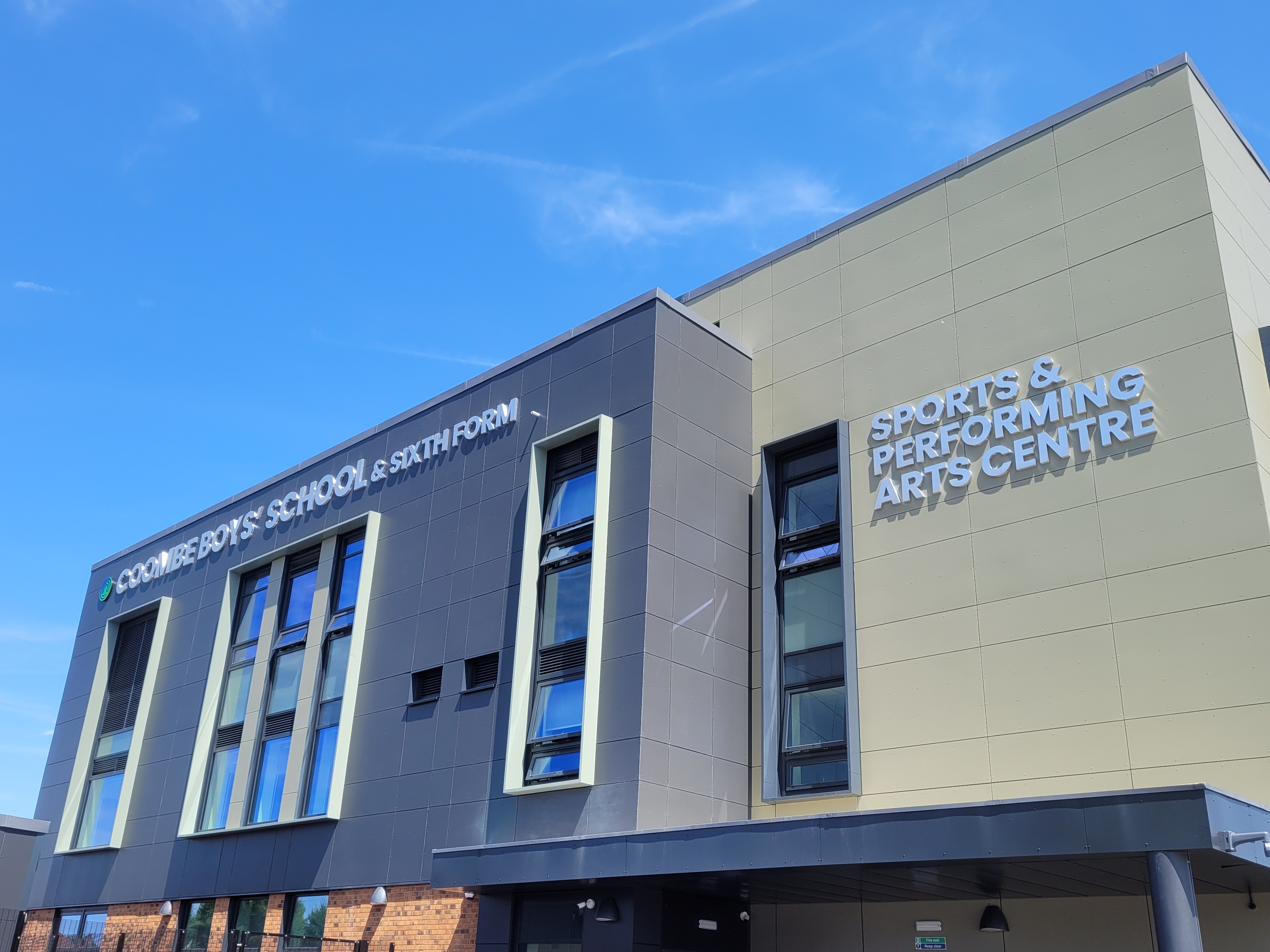

Location
- College Gardens; Blakes Lane; New Malden, Greater London, KT3 6NU; England; 51.394258°N 0.249096°W

Information
- Type: Academy
- Motto: Excellence, Ambition, and Integrity
- Established: 1931
- Department for Education URN: 137859 Tables
- Ofsted: Reports
- Chair: Chris Henley
- Executive Headteacher: Esther Brooks
- Headteacher: David Smith
- Staff: c.50
- Gender: Boys; Coeducational (sixth form)
- Age: 11 to 18
- Enrolment: 974
- Houses: Beech; Cedar; Elm; Oak; Willow; Chestnut
- Colours: Black and Green
- Website: www.coombeboysschool.org

Coombe Boys' School and Sixth Form is a non-selective boys' state secondary school with a mixed sixth form in New Malden, Royal Borough of Kingston upon Thames, England. The cohort comprises boys from Years 7 to 11, and a sixth form facility joint with Coombe Girls' School is offered for Year 12 and 13 students. The school specialises in sports and performing arts.

== History ==
The school was founded in 1931 (as Beverley Central School) and celebrated its 90th anniversary in 2021. Until 2005, it was named Beverley Boys' School.

In 2006, the school federated with Coombe Girls' School and Sixth Form, forming part of the Coombe Academy Trust. It has a long-standing educational partnership with the independent King's College School, Wimbledon. Coombe Boys' School is part of the Kingston Teaching School Alliance, a partnership of over twenty schools, Achieving for Children (AfC) and two higher education institutions; the UCL Institute of Education (University of London) and the University of Roehampton.

In February 2023, it was announced that large parts of the school buildings are to be demolished and replaced in a major re-building programme.

== Results and achievements ==
The school was inspected by Ofsted in December 2013 and again, in a short inspection, in March 2018. The overall inspection rating for Coombe Boys' School on both occasions was 'Good with Outstanding Features'. In 2013, the school was rated 'Outstanding' for Leadership and Management and 'Good' in 'Achievement of Pupils', the 'Quality of Teaching' and the 'Behaviour and Safety of Pupils'.

In 2020, Coombe Boys' Drama Department was awarded the first 'National Outstanding School Drama Department' at the Music & Drama Education Awards. Judges remarked that the Coombe Boys' Drama Team were "an exemplary department which goes above and beyond in the pursuit of excellence in drama provision".

== Sport ==
Sports offered include football, table tennis, badminton, rugby, basketball, athletics and cricket with links to the local Malden Wanderers Cricket Club. The school's sporting achievements include the Surrey basketball finals, Surrey football finals, national badminton finals and winning the English Schools' Football Association PlayStation F.C. Schools' Cup two years running in 2014 and 2015.

== CAPA – Performing Arts ==
In 2019 the Coombe Academy Trust launched CAPA, the Coombe Academy of Performing Arts, which is based at the Coombe Boys' school site. It provides out of hours tuition available to boys and girls (aged 9 upwards) from the local community.

== Notable alumni ==
=== Beverley Boys' School ===
- Cyril Barton VC — RAF bomber pilot, posthumously awarded the Victoria Cross for his actions in World War II
- Sqn Ldr Ian Bazalgette VC DFC — posthumously awarded the Victoria Cross for bravery in World War II
- Matthew Pennycook, MP for Greenwich and Woolwich

=== Coombe Boys' School ===
- Fabio Carvalho, footballer for Brentford FC
- Harvey Elliott — footballer for Aston Villa FC
- Ryan Sessegnon — footballer for Fulham FC
- Steven Sessegnon — footballer for Wigan Athletic FC
- Luke Harris - footballer for Wycombe Wanderers
- James Giles - local councillor and political activist
- Wes McDonald - footballer for Mağusa Türk Gücü
