= Hampton Wick railway station =

National Rail station in London, England

Hampton Wick
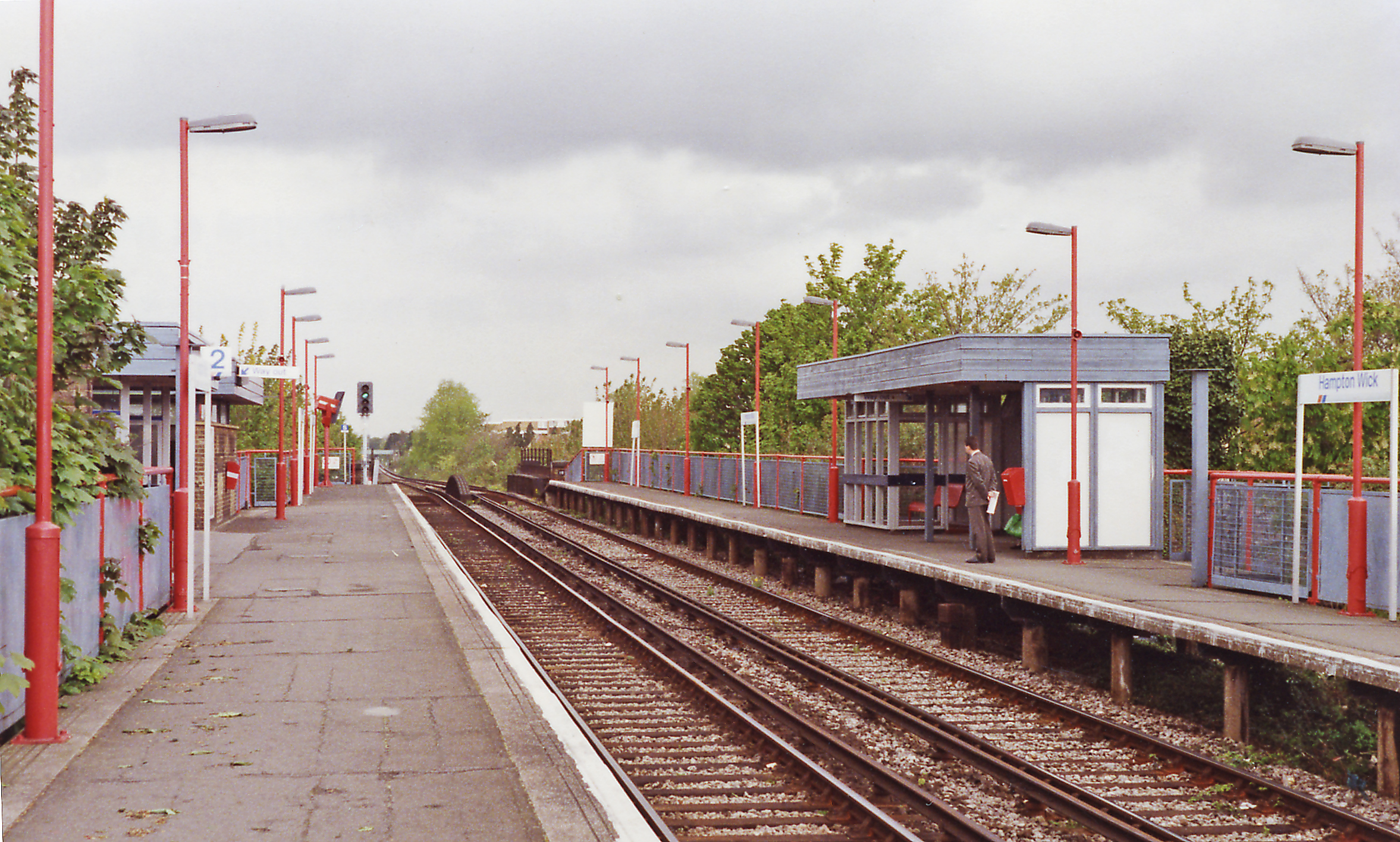
- Interactive map of Hampton Wick

General information
- Location: Hampton Wick
- Local authority: London Borough of Richmond upon Thames
- Managed by: South Western Railway
- Station code: HMW
- DfT category: D
- Number of platforms: 2
- Fare zone: 6

National Rail annual entry and exit
- 2020–21: ▼0.199 million
- 2021–22: ▲0.509 million
- 2022–23: ▲0.651 million
- 2023–24: ▲0.768 million
- 2024–25: ▲0.811 million

Key dates
- 1 July 1863: Opened

Other information
- External links: Departures; Facilities
- Coordinates: 51.4141°N 0.3107°W

Hampton Wick railway station is located on the High Street, at Hampton Wick in the London Borough of Richmond upon Thames, in London fare zone 6. The suburb of Hampton Wick is on the opposite bank of the River Thames from Kingston upon Thames and lies at the eastern end of Hampton Court Park.

It is 12 miles 44 chains (20.2 km) down the line from London Waterloo. The station and all trains serving it are operated by South Western Railway.

== History ==
The original station was opened by the London and South Western Railway on 1 July 1863: it was reconstructed in 1969. Platforms are above the street level ticket office. The ticket office is only open at peak times but tickets can be bought at other times from a ticket machine. The station is usually unstaffed. The journey time to London Waterloo is 30 minutes (via Wimbledon) or slightly longer via Richmond.

== Accidents and incidents ==
- On 6 August 1888, a light engine and a passenger train were in a head-on collision due to a signalman's error. Four people were killed and fifteen were injured.

On 18 June 1930 a baby boy was found in the First Class carriage of a train travelling from Waterloo by Mr Paul Broome, the railway guard. The baby was found with a note which indicated whoever left him contemplated suicide. The baby was taken to Kingston Hospital. CID investigated the issue but whoever left the baby was never found.

== Services ==
All services at Hampton Wick are operated by South Western Railway.

The typical off-peak service in trains per hour is:

- 4 tph to London Waterloo via Wimbledon
- 2 tph to Shepperton
- 2 tph to Teddington, returning to London Waterloo via Richmond

On Sundays, the services to and from London Waterloo via Wimbledon are reduced to 2 tph and the services to and from Shepperton and Teddington are reduced to hourly.

Preceding station	National Rail	Following station
Kingston	South Western Railway Kingston Loop Line	Teddington

== Connections ==
London Buses routes London Buses route 281, 285 and 641 serve the station.
