= List of sub-regions used in the London Plan =

London sub-regions
- The five sub-regions shown within Greater London
- Location: London
- Found in: Greater London
- Created: 2004
- Number: 5 (as of 2011)
- Populations: 1–4 million
- Subdivisions: London boroughs

Greater London is divided into five sub-regions for the purposes of the London Plan. The boundaries of these areas were amended in 2008 and 2011 and their role in the implementation of the London Plan has varied with each iteration.

== Purpose ==
Sub-regions are a feature of the London Plan intended to encourage partnership working across London borough boundaries.

== History ==
From 2004 to 2008, the sub-regions were initially the same as the Learning and Skills Council areas set up in 1999. These 2004–2008 sub-regions each had a Sub-Regional Development Framework. The sub-regions were revised in February 2008 as part of the Further Alterations to the London Plan. The 2008–2011 sub-regions, each had its own Sub-regional Implementation Framework. In 2011, the sub-regions were revised again. The 2011 sub-regions are used for statutory monitoring, engagement and resource allocation. The sub-regions have remained static since 2011, unchanged in the 2016 published plan and 2019 draft plan.

== List of sub-regions ==
=== 2004–2008 ===
Sub-region	London boroughs	Population (2001)
Central	Camden, Islington, Kensington and Chelsea, Southwark, Wandsworth, Westminster	1,525,000
East	Barking and Dagenham, Bexley, City of London, Greenwich, Hackney, Havering, Lewisham, Newham, Redbridge, Tower Hamlets	1,991,000
North	Barnet, Enfield, Haringey, Waltham Forest	1,042,000
South	Bromley, Croydon, Kingston upon Thames, Lambeth, Merton, Richmond upon Thames, Sutton	1,329,000
West	Brent, Ealing, Hammersmith and Fulham, Harrow, Hillingdon, Hounslow	1,421,000

=== 2008–2011 ===
Sub-region	London boroughs	Population	Jobs
North East	Barking and Dagenham, City of London, Havering, Newham, Redbridge, Tower Hamlets, Waltham Forest	1.4 million	900,000
North	Barnet, Camden, Enfield, Hackney, Haringey, Islington, Westminster	1.7 million	1.5 million
South East	Bexley, Bromley, Greenwich, Lewisham, Southwark	1.3 million	500,000
South West	Croydon, Kingston upon Thames, Lambeth, Merton, Richmond upon Thames, Sutton, Wandsworth	1.6 million	730,000
West	Brent, Ealing, Hammersmith and Fulham, Harrow, Hillingdon, Hounslow, Kensington and Chelsea	1.6 million	900,000

=== From 2011 ===
Sub-region	London boroughs	Area
Central	Camden, City of London, Kensington and Chelsea, Islington, Lambeth, Southwark, Westminster	13,136.02 hectares (50.7185 sq mi)
East	Barking and Dagenham, Bexley, Greenwich, Hackney, Havering, Lewisham, Newham, Redbridge, Tower Hamlets, Waltham Forest	47,673.77 hectares (184.0695 sq mi)
North	Barnet, Enfield, Haringey	19,853.67 hectares (76.6554 sq mi)
South	Bromley, Croydon, Kingston upon Thames, Merton, Sutton, Wandsworth	44,936.52 hectares (173.5009 sq mi)
West	Brent, Ealing, Hammersmith and Fulham, Harrow, Richmond upon Thames, Hillingdon, Hounslow	33,868.62 hectares (130.7675 sq mi)

== List of boroughs ==
Borough	2004–2008	2008–2011	2011–present
City of London	East	North East	Central
Barking and Dagenham	East	North East	East
Barnet	North	North	North
Bexley	East	South East	East
Brent	West	West	West
Bromley	South	South East	South
Camden	Central	North	Central
Croydon	South	South West	South
Ealing	West	West	West
Enfield	North	North	North
Greenwich	East	South East	East
Hackney	East	North	East
Hammersmith and Fulham	West	West	West
Haringey	North	North	North
Harrow	West	West	West
Havering	East	North East	East
Hillingdon	West	West	West
Hounslow	West	West	West
Islington	Central	North	Central
Kensington and Chelsea	Central	West	Central
Kingston upon Thames	South	South West	South
Lambeth	Central	South West	Central
Lewisham	East	South East	East
Merton	South	South West	South
Newham	East	North East	East
Redbridge	East	North East	East
Richmond upon Thames	South	South West	West
Southwark	Central	South East	Central
Sutton	South	South West	South
Tower Hamlets	East	North East	East
Waltham Forest	North	North East	East
Wandsworth	Central	South West	South
Westminster	Central	North	Central
