= London Buses route 281 =

London bus route

281
- First Bus London BYD Alexander Dennis Enviro400EV in Kingston upon Thames in August 2026

Overview
- Operator: London United (First Bus London)
- Garage: Fulwell
- Vehicle: BYD Alexander Dennis Enviro400EV; Volvo B5LH Wright Eclipse Gemini 3
- Peak vehicle requirement: Day: 19; Night: 4
- Began service: 9 May 1962
- Predecessors: Trolleybus Route 601
- Night-time: 24-hour service

Route
- Start: Hounslow bus station
- Via: Whitton; Twickenham; Teddington; Kingston; Surbiton
- End: Tolworth station
- Length: 11 miles (18 km)

Service
- Level: 24-hour service
- Frequency: About every 8 minutes
- Journey time: 45-81 minutes
- Operates: 24-hour service

London Buses route 281 is a Transport for London contracted bus route in London, England. Running between Hounslow bus station and Tolworth station, it is operated by First Bus London subsidiary London United.

== History ==
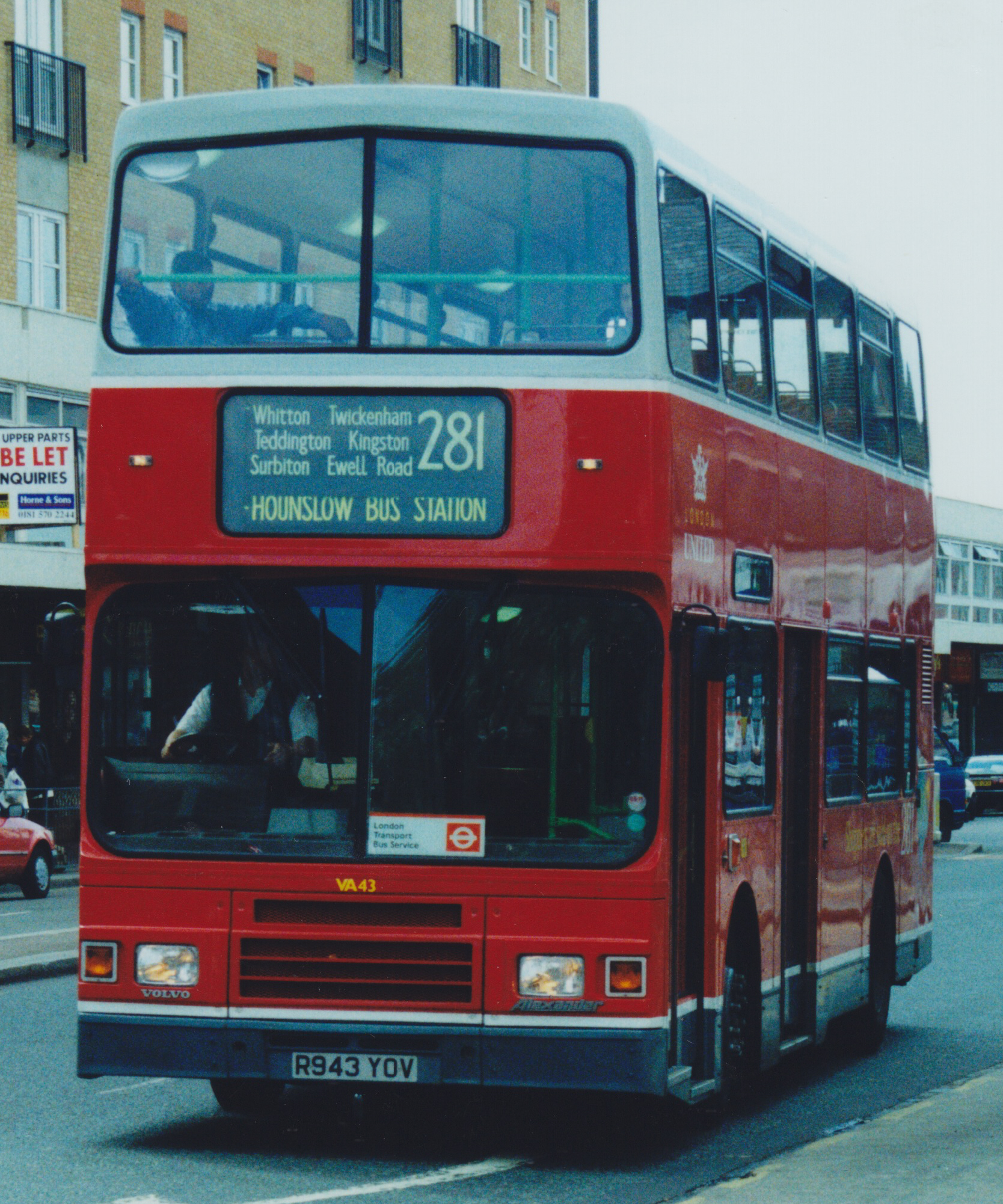
London United Alexander RH bodied Volvo Olympian in Hounslow in September 1998

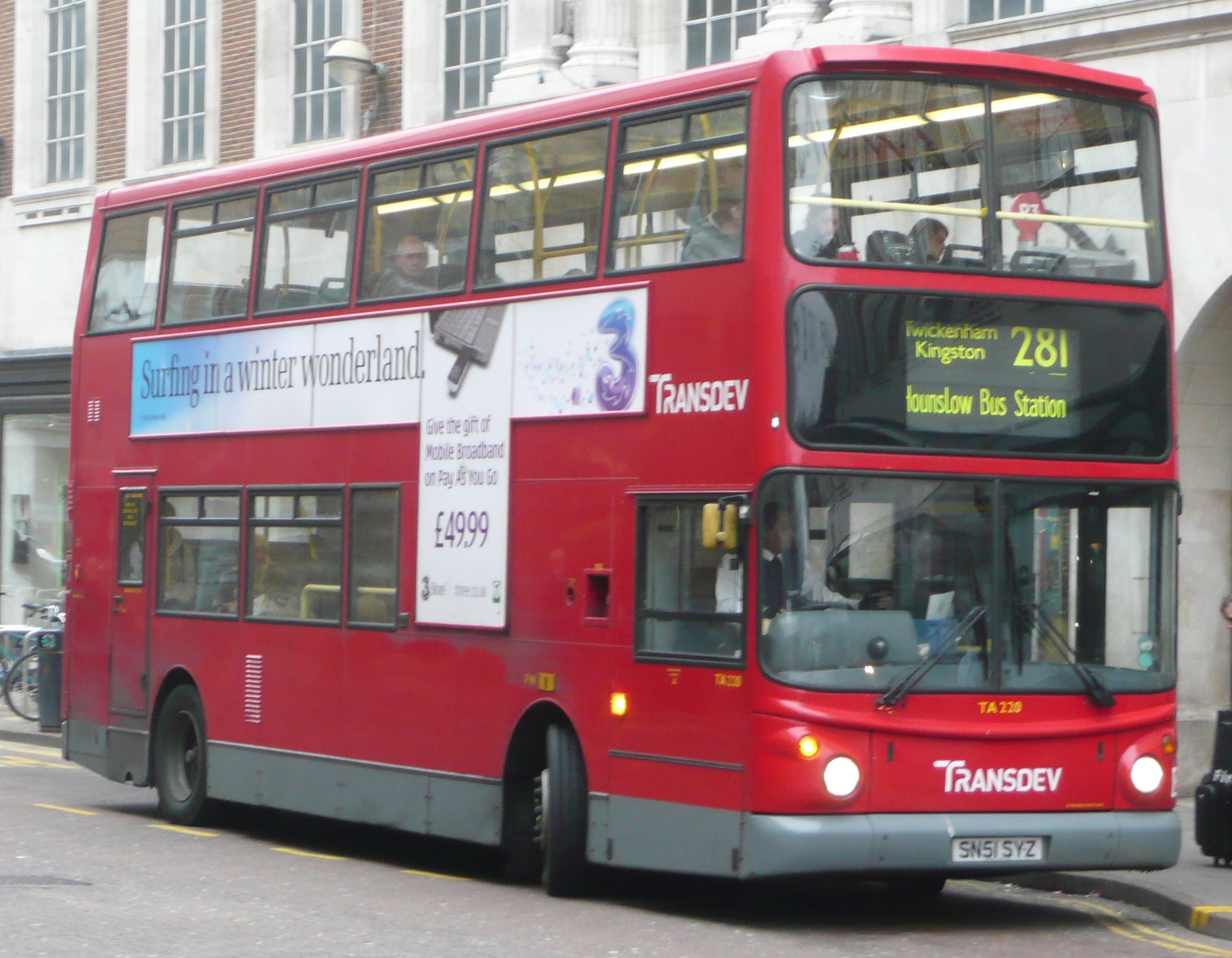
Transdev London TransBus ALX400 bodied TransBus Trident in Kingston upon Thames in December 2008

Route 281 was introduced between Twickenham and Tolworth on 9 May 1962 to replace trolleybus route 601, operating from Fulwell garage. On 15 August 1981 it was converted from AEC Routemaster to MCW Metrobus operation.

In 2000, the route was identified as one of the most popular in London, with approximately 5.5 million passengers using the service that year.

On 3 June 2006, route 281 became the 100th night bus service in London, when a 24-hour service introduced. It replaced a portion of route N22, which was shortened to end at Fulwell.

Since the privatisation of London bus services, it has always been operated by London United out of Fulwell garage.

On 28 February 2025, the route passed from London United to First Bus London following the acquisition of RATP Dev Transit London by FirstGroup.

== Current route ==
Route 281 operates via these main locations:

- Hounslow bus station
- Hounslow station
- Whitton
- Twickenham Stadium
- Twickenham station
- Fulwell station
- Teddington
- Hampton Wick station
- Cromwell Road bus station
- Kingston station
- Kingston University
- Surbiton station
- Tolworth station

== Incidents ==
In July 2005, shortly after the 7 July 2005 London bombings, the route was the subject of a hoax bomb threat.
