= Coombe Girls' School =

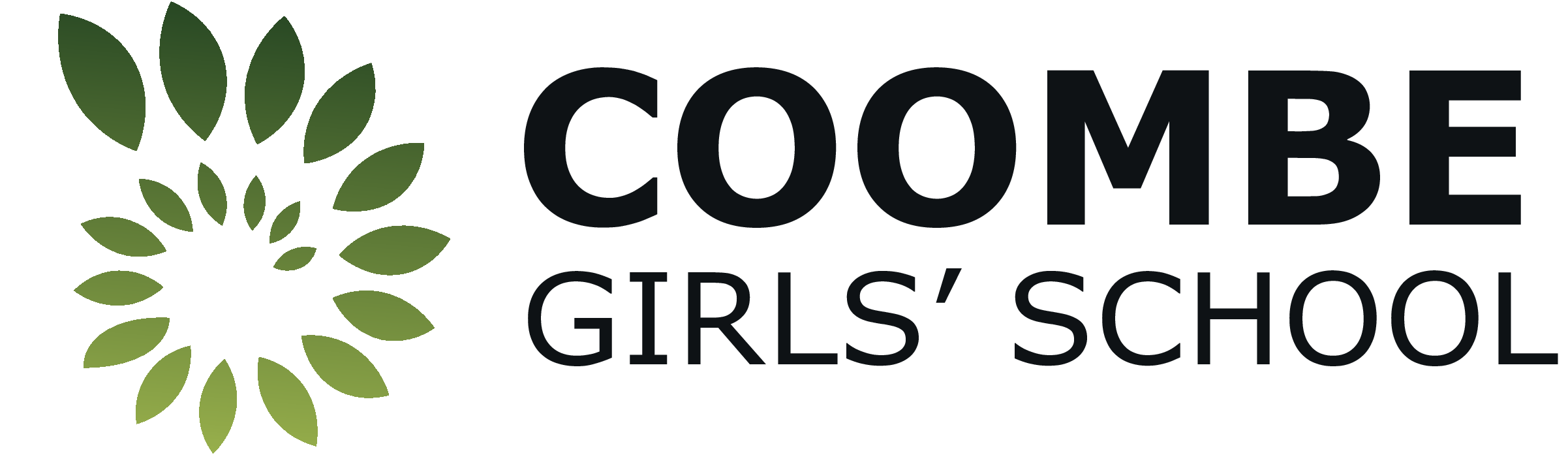

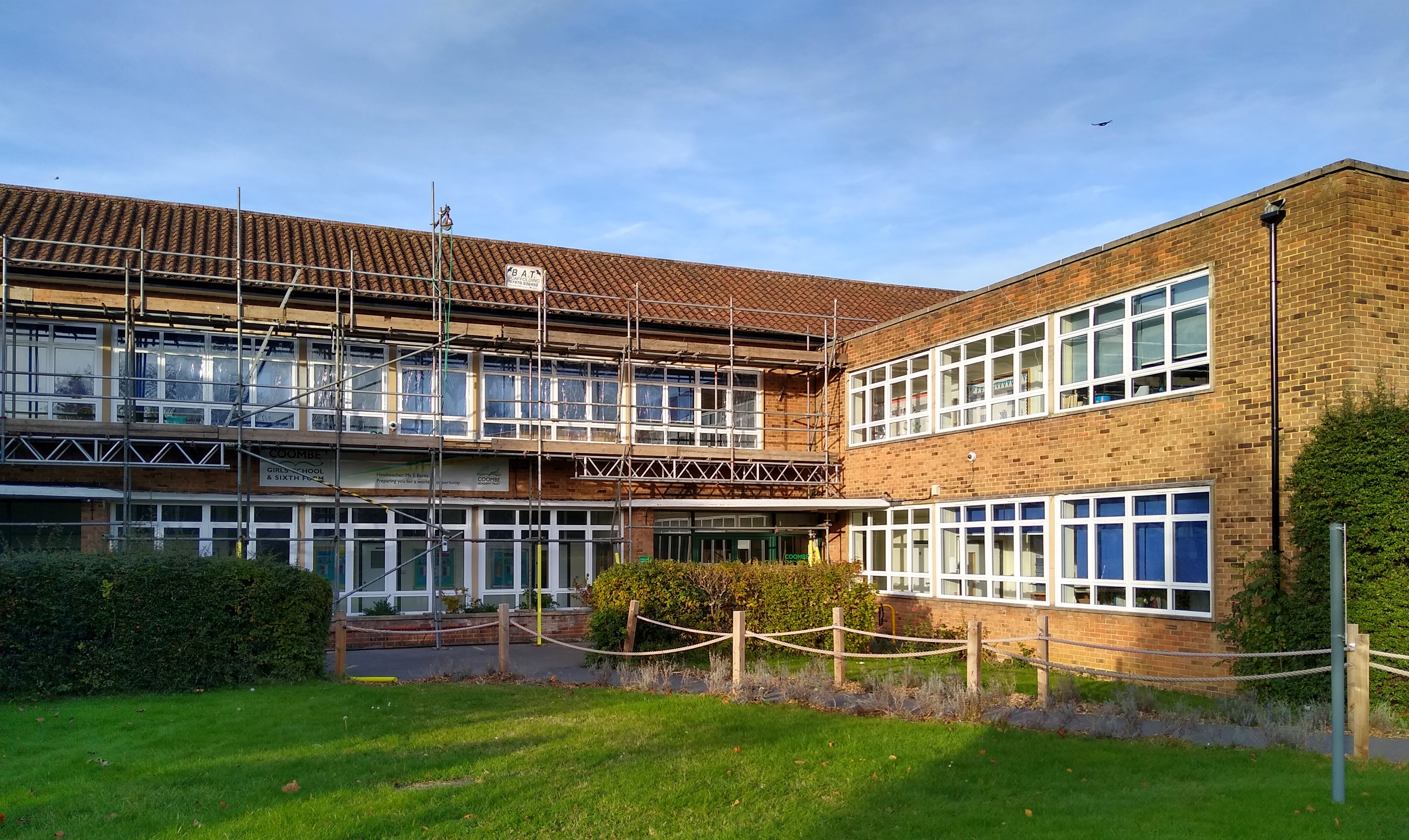

Location
- Clarence Avenue; New Malden, Greater London, KT3 3TU; England; 51.41024°N 0.26317°W

Information
- Type: Academy
- Motto: Curious, Creative, Confident
- Established: 1955
- Department for Education URN: 137848 Tables
- Ofsted: Reports
- Gender: Girls; Coeducational (sixth form)
- Age: 11 to 18
- Houses: Venus; Mercury; Mars; Jupiter; Saturn; Pluto; Neptune; Orion
- Website: http://www.coombegirlsschool.org/

Coombe Girls' School and Sixth Form is an all-girls’ secondary school with academy status in New Malden, South West London. It offers a co-educational sixth form jointly with nearby Coombe Boys' School. The school is a Leading Edge School and specialises in languages.

== History ==
Coombe Girls' School was established in 1955 as Coombe County Secondary Girls' School (a name it kept until 1965) and has remained an all-girls’ school ever since. The school now forms part of the Coombe Academy Trust along with Coombe Boys' School and Knollmead, Green Lane and Robin Hood local primary schools.

== Ofsted report ==
The school was inspected in 2024, with an overall judgement of Good. The school was judged as Good in 'Quality of Education', 'Behaviour and Attitudes', 'Leadership and Management' and 'Sixth Form Provision', and Outstanding in 'Personal Development'.

The inspectors commented that "Leaders provide a high-quality education to all pupils" and that "[they] are ambitious for the school and have implemented a number of changes recently". Although the attainment of students by the end of Year 13 was below the national average, pupils in Key Stage 4 were found to achieve very well across all subjects, and the inspectors remarked that the school "has made considerable improvements to strengthen the curriculum in the sixth form."

The school was previously inspected as Outstanding in 2013.

== Exam results ==
In 2024, 41% of all GCSE examinations were awarded grades 7 to 9, while the school achieved a provisional Progress 8 score of +0.7, classed as "well above the national average".

The average grade achieved by 16–18 A-level students was C, below the national average.

Coombe Girls' was named one of the best state secondary schools in the country in Tatler magazine's 2015 State Schools Guide.

== Notable alumni ==
- Jacqueline Wilson, children's author
- Sandy Denny, lead singer of the folk rock band Fairport Convention
- Penny Spencer, actress best-known for playing Sharon in the first three series of the ITV school sitcom Please Sir!.
