= Achieving for Children =

British social services company

- Type: Social enterprise
- Industry: Social services
- Founded: 2014
- Headquarters: England
- Areas served: Richmond upon Thames, Kingston upon Thames, Windsor & Maidenhead
- Website: www.achievingforchildren.org.uk

Achieving for Children (AfC) is a social enterprise company created in 2014 by the Royal Borough of Kingston upon Thames and the London Borough of Richmond upon Thames to provide social services for children. It is thought to have been the first company of its kind.

Ofsted rates Achieving for Children as "outstanding" for children's services in the Kingston borough, following an inspection in October 2019.

When the company was launched in 2014, it was described as the "future model of Children's Services". It enabled the two councils to save money by sharing services whilst avoiding some of the "organisational difficulties", and allowing them to work in ways that would not be possible as a local authority. Some critics were concerned that AfC represented a privatisation of children' social services as well as a reduction in accountability and scrutiny, and there was scepticism over whether service levels could be maintained and improved in the wake of significant spending cuts. The organisation was subsequently credited with improving Kingston's children's services from an "Inadequate" to "good" Ofsted rating. A 2016 independent Government review of the establishment of AfC concluded that the transformation had demonstrated positive results for service quality and financial return, with a number of benefits realised as well as lessons learned.

On 1 August 2017, the Royal Borough of Windsor and Maidenhead became a co-owner of AfC, which now delivers children's services across all three boroughs.

In December 2019, Kingston and Richmond Councils both agreed to recommission Achieving for Children to deliver their children's services until 31 March 2026.

== Similar organisations ==
Similar organisations to AfC have been created in Doncaster and Slough, though these were established as part of Government interventions rather than voluntarily. The Government's review of the establishment of AfC also referred to "alternative delivery models being considered or developed in other local authorities such as ... Sunderland and Birmingham, and voluntarily in areas such as Lincolnshire."
