= Royal Borough of Kingston upon Thames =

Royal borough in London, England

Coordinates: 51.39°N 0.28°W

- London borough, Royal borough
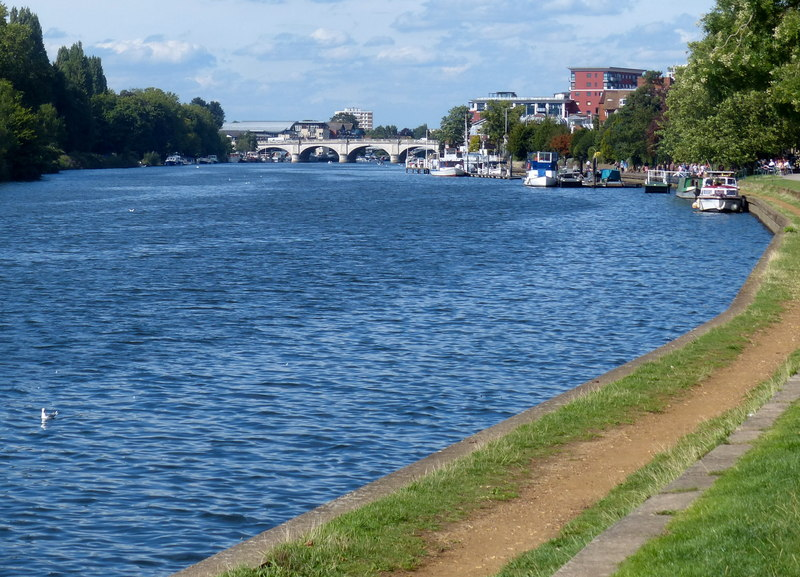
- River Thames passing through Kingston upon Thames

- Flag Coat of arms Council logo

- Kingston upon Thames shown within Greater London
- Sovereign state: United Kingdom
- Constituent country: England
- Region: London
- Ceremonial county: Greater London
- Created: 1 April 1965
- Admin HQ: Kingston upon Thames

Government
  - Type: London borough council
  - Body: Kingston upon Thames London Borough Council
  - London Assembly: Gareth Roberts (Liberal Democrats) AM for South West
  - MPs: Sir Ed Davey (LD); Paul Kohler (LD) (Note: Constituency partly in Merton); Sarah Olney (LD) (Note: Constituency partly in Richmond)

Area
  - Total: 14.38 sq mi (37.25 km^{2})
  - Rank: 267th (of 296)

Population (2025)
  - Total: 172,761
  - Rank: 122nd (of 296)
  - Density: 12,010/sq mi (4,638/km^{2})
- Time zone: UTC (GMT)
  - Summer (DST): UTC+1 (BST)
- Postcodes: KT, SW
- Area code: 020
- ISO 3166 code: GB-KTT
- ONS code: 00AX
- GSS code: E09000021
- Police: Metropolitan Police
- Website: http://www.kingston.gov.uk/

The Royal Borough of Kingston upon Thames is a borough in southwest London. The main town is Kingston upon Thames and it includes Chessington, Malden Rushett, New Malden, Surbiton and Tolworth. It is the oldest of the four royal boroughs in England. The others are Windsor and Maidenhead, the site of Windsor Castle, and the London boroughs of Greenwich, and Kensington and Chelsea. The local authority is Kingston upon Thames London Borough Council.

The neighbouring districts (clockwise from north) are the London boroughs of Richmond upon Thames, Wandsworth, Merton and Sutton, and the Surrey districts of Epsom and Ewell, Mole Valley and Elmbridge.

== History ==
Kingston upon Thames, on the south bank of the River Thames has existed for many hundreds of years. Many Roman relics have been found in the surrounding areas. A church has stood on the site of All Saints' Church, in the centre of Kingston, for more than a thousand years. An earlier church was sacked by the Vikings in 1009 AD. Kingston was the site of the coronations of seven Anglo-Saxon monarchs:

- Edward the Elder, son of Alfred the Great, 900AD
- Athelstan, 925AD
- Edmund I, 939AD
- Eadred, 946AD
- Eadwig, 956AD
- Edward the Martyr, 975AD
- Ethelred the Unready, 979AD

The Coronation Stone, on which they are said to have been crowned stands outside the local council offices, the Guildhall. A coin from the reign of each of those kings is set into the base of the stone.

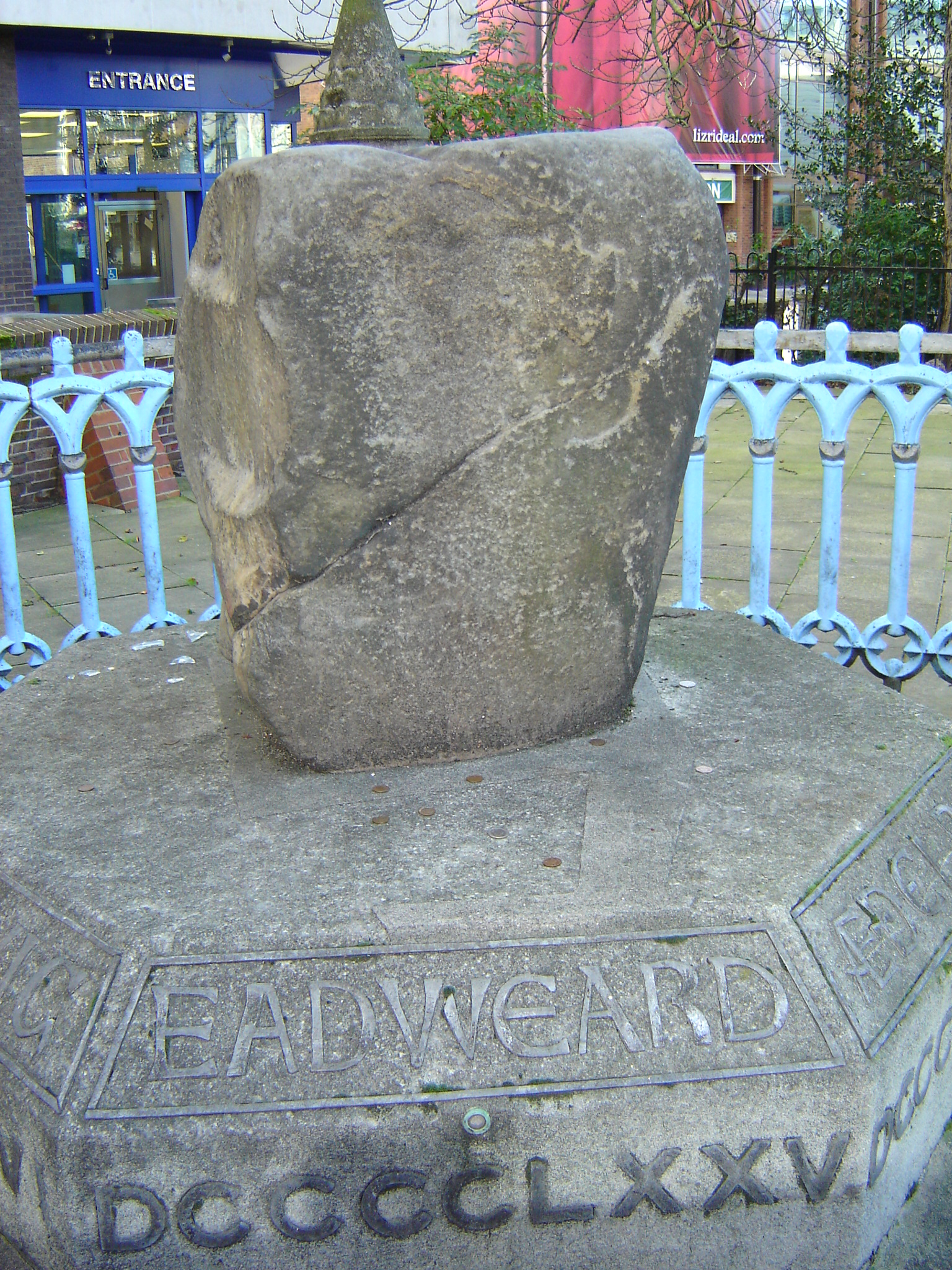
The Saxon Coronation Stone

=== Administrative history ===
The town of Kingston upon Thames was an ancient borough, having been formally incorporated in 1441, with a long history prior to that as a royal manor dating back to Saxon times. The borough was reformed to become a municipal borough in 1836 under the Municipal Corporations Act 1835, which standardised how most boroughs operated across the country. Kingston was often described as a royal borough, with its right to that title being formally confirmed in 1927.

The old borough did not cover the whole parish of Kingston upon Thames, and separate local government arrangements were later put in place for the outlying parts of the parish. Surbiton was made an improvement commissioners district in 1855, and New Malden was made a local government district in 1866.

Such districts were reconstituted as urban districts under the Local Government Act 1894. New Malden was enlarged in 1895 to take in the neighbouring parishes of Coombe and Malden, at which point the urban district was renamed The Maldens and Coombe. Surbiton was also enlarged in 1895, absorbing the parishes of Hook and Tolworth, and again in 1933 when it absorbed Chessington. Both urban districts were incorporated to become municipal boroughs in 1936, at which point The Maldens and Coombe was renamed Malden and Coombe.

The modern borough was created in 1965 under the London Government Act 1963, covering the combined area of the former municipal boroughs of Kingston-upon-Thames, Malden and Coombe and Surbiton. The area was transferred from Surrey to Greater London to become one of the 32 London Boroughs. Kingston's royal borough status transferred to the enlarged borough.

Most of the borough continued to have Surrey postal addresses until postal counties were abolished in 1996. Districts mainly use the KT postcode, except from the parts of Ham in the borough which use the TW code, and the Kingston Vale area in the north-east which has an SW15 postcode.

== Districts in the borough ==
Areas in the borough include:

- Berrylands
- Canbury
- Chessington
- Coombe
- Hook
- Kingston upon Thames
- Kingston Vale
- Malden Rushett
- Motspur Park
- Worcester Park (partly)
- New Malden
- Norbiton
- Old Malden
- Surbiton
- Tolworth

== Governance ==
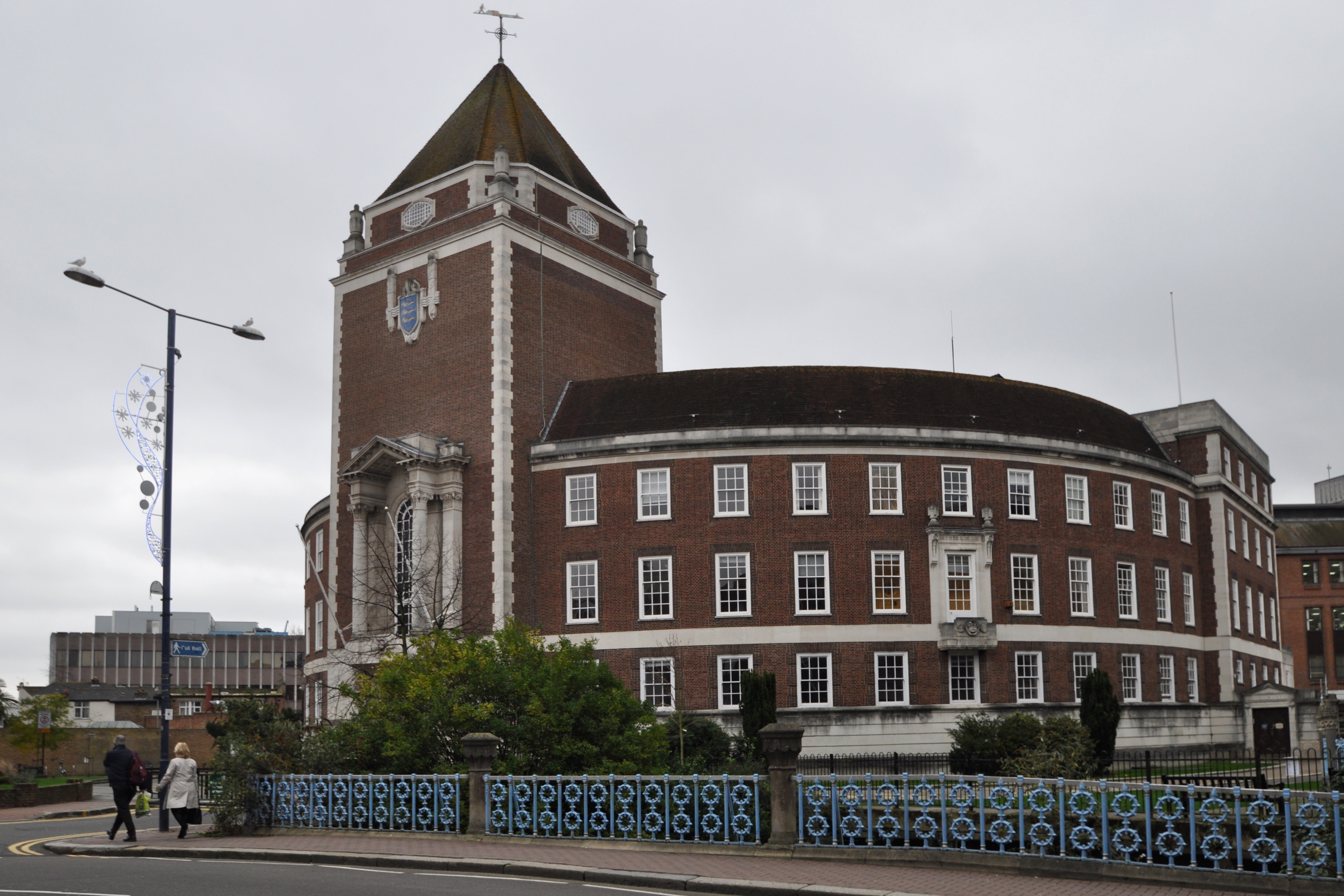
Kingston upon Thames Guildhall is the home of the Borough Council

The local authority is Kingston Council, which is based at Kingston upon Thames Guildhall.

=== Greater London representation ===
Since 2000, for elections to the London Assembly, the borough forms part of the South West constituency.

=== UK Parliament ===
The borough includes the whole of the Kingston and Surbiton Parliamentary Constituency and part of the Richmond Park Constituency with both constituencies being created in 1997. The previous constituencies re-arranged to form these two had been essentially Conservative.

In 1997 the Liberal Democrats won both seats. Jenny Tonge took Richmond Park constituency and in 2005 Susan Kramer became its Liberal Democrat MP with a majority of 3,731 but she was beaten in the May 2010 election by Conservative Zac Goldsmith with a majority of 4,091. Goldsmith retained his seat at the 2015 general election, with a greatly increased majority of 23,015. Goldsmith stood as an Independent candidate in the by-election held on 1 December 2016, but was defeated by Sarah Olney, a Liberal Democrat, after the Conservative Party decided not to put forward its own candidate. Goldsmith regained the seat for the Conservatives in the 2017 general election with a significantly reduced majority of 45 votes. Sarah Olney then regained the seat during the 2019 general election.

In 1997 Ed Davey overturned the previous Conservative majority of more than 10,000 in Kingston and Surbiton, to win by 56 votes after three recounts. He retained the seat in 2001 with a majority of 15,676 over the Conservative candidate David Shaw. In 2005 Davey's majority was 8,961, and in the May 2010 general election he again retained the seat with a slightly reduced majority, beating the Conservative candidate Helen Whately. In the 2015 general election, Davey's seat was taken by Conservative James Berry with a majority of 2,834. Davey's was one of six Liberal Democrat losses in London and 49 overall as the party suffered its worst election results since its formation in 1988. Davey regained the seat in the 2017 general election.

== Demography ==
Population pyramid of the Borough of Kingston upon Thames

Population census
| Year | Pop. | ±% |
|---|---|---|
| 1801 | 4,612 | — |
| 1811 | 4,960 | +7.5% |
| 1821 | 6,050 | +22.0% |
| 1831 | 7,212 | +19.2% |
| 1841 | 9,587 | +32.9% |
| 1851 | 12,080 | +26.0% |
| 1861 | 19,863 | +64.4% |
| 1871 | 27,647 | +39.2% |
| 1881 | 35,430 | +28.2% |
| 1891 | 44,106 | +24.5% |
| 1901 | 54,956 | +24.6% |
| 1911 | 68,481 | +24.6% |
| 1921 | 79,468 | +16.0% |
| 1931 | 92,220 | +16.0% |
| 1941 | 115,055 | +24.8% |
| 1951 | 143,545 | +24.8% |
| 1961 | 142,448 | −0.8% |
| 1971 | 141,375 | −0.8% |
| 1981 | 131,230 | −7.2% |
| 1991 | 137,453 | +4.7% |
| 2001 | 147,295 | +7.2% |
| 2011 | 160,060 | +8.7% |
| 2021 | 168,065 | +5.0% |
| 2024 estimate | 172,692 | +2.8% |
Note: 2024 estimate

=== Ethnicity ===
The following table shows the ethnic group of respondents in the 2001 and 2011 census in Kingston upon Thames.

| Ethnic Group | Year | | | | | | | | | | | |
| Ethnic Group | 1971 estimations | | 1981 estimations | | 1991 census | | 2001 census | | 2011 census | | 2021 census | |
| Ethnic Group | Number | % | Number | % | Number | % | Number | % | Number | % | Number | % |
| White: Total | – | 97.9% | 122,709 | 94.6% | 121,548 | 91.4% | 124,392 | 84.46% | 119,219 | 74.48% | 114,831 | 68.3% |
|---|---|---|---|---|---|---|---|---|---|---|---|---|
| White: British | – | – | – | – | – | – | 111,810 | 75.92% | 101,015 | 63.11% | 90,288 | 53.7% |
| White: Irish | – | – | – | – | – | – | 3,201 | 2.17% | 2,718 | 1.70% | 2,633 | 1.6% |
| White: Gypsy or Irish Traveller | – | – | – | – | – | – | – | – | 95 | 0.06% | 61 | 0.0% |
| White: Roma | – | – | – | – | – | – | – | – | – | – | 445 | 0.3% |
| White: Other | – | – | – | – | – | – | 9,381 | 6.37% | 15,391 | 9.62% | 21,404 | 12.7% |
| Asian or Asian British: Total | – | – | – | – | 8,447 | 6.35% | 13,492 | 9.16% | 26,152 | 16.34% | 29,938 | 17.9% |
| Asian or Asian British: Indian | – | – | – | – | 3,069 | | 5,322 | 3.61% | 6,325 | 3.95% | 7,731 | 4.6% |
| Asian or Asian British: Pakistani | – | – | – | – | 858 | | 1,916 | 1.30% | 3,009 | 1.88% | 4,380 | 2.6% |
| Asian or Asian British: Bangladeshi | – | – | – | – | 147 | | 384 | 0.26% | 892 | 0.56% | 932 | 0.6% |
| Asian or Asian British: Chinese | – | – | – | – | 1,089 | | 2,026 | 1.38% | 2,883 | 1.80% | 4,127 | 2.5% |
| Asian or Asian British: Other Asian | – | – | – | – | 3,284 | | 3,844 | 2.61% | 13,043 | 8.15% | 12,768 | 7.6% |
| Black or Black British: Total | – | – | – | – | 1,296 | 0.97% | 2,309 | 1.57% | 4,021 | 2.51% | 4,741 | 2.% |
| Black or Black British: African | – | – | – | – | 478 | | 1,406 | 0.95% | 2,616 | 1.63% | 3,105 | 1.8% |
| Black or Black British: Caribbean | – | – | – | – | 507 | | 772 | 0.52% | 1,027 | 0.64% | 1,081 | 0.6% |
| Black or Black British: Other Black | – | – | – | – | 311 | | 131 | 0.09% | 378 | 0.24% | 555 | 0.3% |
| Mixed or British Mixed: Total | – | – | – | – | – | – | 3,357 | 2.28% | 6,269 | 3.92% | 8,996 | 5.3% |
| Mixed: White and Black Caribbean | – | – | – | – | – | – | 591 | 0.40% | 1,238 | 0.77% | 1,564 | 0.9% |
| Mixed: White and Black African | – | – | – | – | – | – | 392 | 0.27% | 700 | 0.44% | 1,090 | 0.6% |
| Mixed: White and Asian | – | – | – | – | – | – | 1,398 | 0.95% | 2,500 | 1.56% | 3,540 | 2.1% |
| Mixed: Other Mixed | – | – | – | – | – | – | 976 | 0.66% | 1,831 | 1.14% | 2,802 | 1.7% |
| Other: Total | – | – | – | – | 1,705 | 1.3% | 3,723 | 2.53% | 4,399 | 2.75% | 9,559 | 5.7% |
| Other: Arab | – | – | – | – | – | – | – | – | 2,439 | 1.52% | 3,580 | 2.1% |
| Other: Any other ethnic group | – | – | – | – | 1,705 | 1.3% | 3,723 | 2.53% | 1,960 | 1.22% | 5,979 | 3.6% |
| Non-White: Total | – | 2.1% | 6,986 | 5.4% | 11,448 | 8.62% | 22,881 | 15.54% | 40,841 | 25.52% | 53,234 | 31.7% |
| Total | – | 100% | 129,695 | 100% | 132,996 | 100% | 147,273 | 100.00% | 160,060 | 100.00% | 168,065 | 100% |

=== Immigration ===
This list includes top-15 sources of immigration to Royal Borough of Kingston upon Thames for 2021 census:

| # | Country | Number |
|---|---|---|
| 1 | India | 3,690 |
| 2 | Sri Lanka | 3,365 |
| 3 | Poland | 2,568 |
| 4 | South Korea | 2,425 |
| 5 | South Africa | 2,059 |
| 6 | Pakistan | 1,979 |
| 7 | Bulgaria | 1,824 |
| 8 | Iraq | 1,657 |
| 9 | Ireland | 1,630 |
| 10 | Italy | 1,609 |
| 11 | China | 1,548 |
| 12 | Germany | 1,544 |
| 13 | Philippines | 1,346 |
| 14 | Iran | 1,298 |
| 15 | Romania | 1,157 |

== Modern Kingston ==
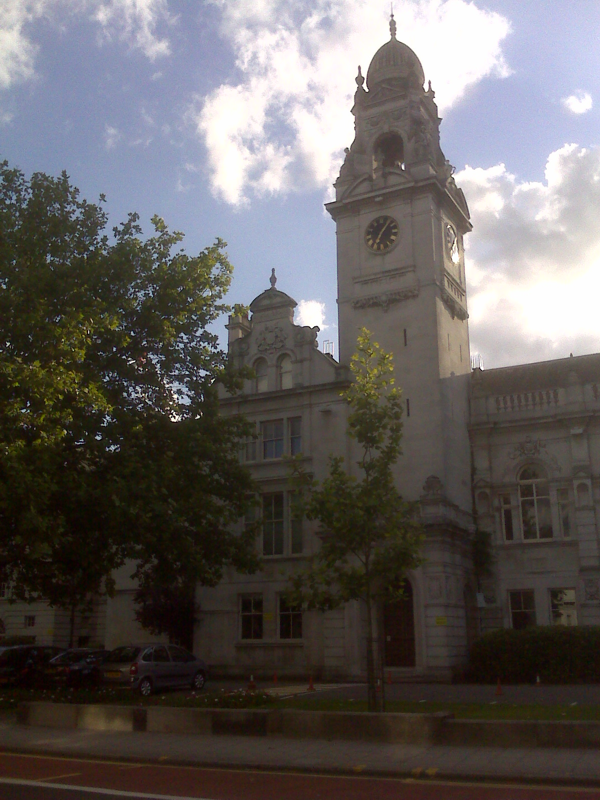
Surrey County Hall Clock Tower

Kingston benefits from one of the biggest and most visited shopping areas outside of central London, with a varied selection of high street stores, and a large number of independent boutiques and retailers.

The most famous shop in Kingston is Bentalls, started by Frank Bentall in 1867 in Clarence Street, where it (or at least the completely rebuilt Bentall Centre) stands.

Close to Kingston, and located between Kingston, Richmond and Roehampton, is Richmond Park, one of the oldest of London's royal parks.

The borough is home to the highest number of South Koreans in Europe, in the town of New Malden.

== Tourism in Kingston ==
Kingston has many attractions in and near it, ranging from nature and historical attractions to theme parks.

Some of the borough's attractions are:

- Chessington World of Adventures. Resort in the south of the borough. The closest railway station is Chessington South. Chessington is one of the UK's premier theme parks attracting thousands of visitors from all around the UK to its rides, aquarium and zoo.
- Thames Riverside. A walkway beside the Thames at Kingston and Surbiton, it has a variety of restaurants.
- Coronation Stone. Situated outside The Guildhall in Kingston, this ancient rock was the crowning point of some of England's early kings.
- Richmond Park. One of the world's largest urban parks, its Kingston Gate is situated within the borough's boundary.
- Kingston Town Centre. One of London's biggest shopping destinations, with hundreds of shops, cafes and restaurants, as well as a large entertainment complex, including an Odeon Cinema and Tenpin Bowling. Also in the town centre is a historic market which has been running for hundreds of years.
- Rose Theatre. An 822-seat theatre in the centre of Kingston.
- Bentall Centre (a shopping centre). It is home to over 75 shops (including the Bentalls department store), restaurants and other services.

== Economy ==
Kingston is the 3rd largest retail centre by employment, in London.

Sega Amusements International, responsible for the production of arcade games outside Japan, has its head office in Chessington, Royal Borough of Kingston upon Thames. Lidl relocated its GB Headquarters to Tolworth in 2020. Their previous GB Head Office was in Worple Road, Wimbledon.

== Industry ==
Sopwith Aviation Company had a factory in the Canbury Park area of Kingston, where the famous Sopwith Camel was produced during World War I. The Hawker Hurricane was designed at a site in Kingston town centre and built in the aviation factory near Ham now known as the Hawker Centre.

== Education ==
Primary responsibility for education in the borough lies with the local education authority.

Free schools:

- The Kingston Academy (mixed), Richmond Road, Kingston upon Thames, KT2 5PE

Academy schools:

- Chessington School (mixed), Garrison Lane, Chessington KT9 2JS
- Coombe Boys’ School, College Gardens, Blakes Lane, New Malden KT3 6NU
- Coombe Girls’ School, Clarence Avenue, New Malden KT3 3TU
- The Hollyfield School and Sixth Form Centre (mixed), Surbiton Hill Road, Surbiton KT6 4TU
- Holy Cross School (girls) (Roman Catholic), Sandal Road, New Malden KT3 5AR
- Richard Challoner School (boys) (Roman Catholic), Manor Drive North, New Malden KT3 5PE
- Southborough High School (boys), Hook Road, Surbiton KT6 5AS
- Tolworth Girls’ School and Sixth Form, Fullers Way North, Surbiton KT6 7LQ

Grammar schools:

- Tiffin Girls’ School, Richmond Road, Kingston upon Thames KT2 5PL
- Tiffin School (boys), Queen Elizabeth Road, Kingston upon Thames KT2 6RL

Independent Schools

- Kingston Grammar School, 70 London Rd, Kingston upon Thames KT2 6PY
- Surbiton High School, 13 - 15 Surbiton Cres, Kingston upon Thames KT1 2JT

=== Further education ===
- Kingston College
- Hillcroft College

=== Higher education ===
- Kingston University

== Transport ==
Kingston has nine South Western Railway stations and two centrally located bus stations, but no London Underground or other Transport for London stations. In 2008, 64 bus routes served the Kingston-area.

=== Railway ===
Coaching interests in Kingston opposed the plan of the London and Southampton Railway to run its line to Southampton near Kingston. The line consequently avoided the town with a station opened in 1838 southwest of the town; it was later resited to the present site of Surbiton station.

In 1863 a branch was built from Twickenham to a terminus in Kingston. That line was extended to the main line in 1869 to form the Kingston Loop Line.

All rail services in the borough are operated by South Western Railway, who provide regular services to and from London Waterloo.

Railway stations in the borough:

- Berrylands, London Zone 5
- Chessington North, London Zone 6
- Chessington South, London Zone 6
- Kingston, London Zone 6
- Malden Manor, London Zone 4
- New Malden, London Zone 4
- Norbiton, London Zone 5
- Surbiton, London Zone 6
- Tolworth, London Zone 5

=== Travel to work ===
In March 2011, the main forms of transport that residents used to travel to work were: driving a car or van, 26.1% of all residents aged 16–74; train, 7.1%; bus, minibus or coach, 7.1%; on foot, 6.9%; work mainly at or from home, 4.3%; bicycle, 2.8%; underground, metro, light rail, tram, 2.5%.

== Coat of arms ==
Arms of the Former Municipal Boroughs of Malden and Coombe (top left) and Surbiton (top right), whose crests and supporters respectively were added to the Kingston's coat of arms in 1966 (bottom)

The Kingston coat of arms displays three salmon and its shield is almost identical to the coat of arms of the Swedish municipality of Laholm. Both coats of arms can be traced back to the 16th century. The arms of the former Mandal Municipality in Norway was also similar, but more recent.

In 1966 the newly created London Borough added a set crests and supporters taken from the localities merged into it. The crest came from the Municipal Borough of Malden and Coombe, with that borough's arms hung from the neck of the stag, and the supporters taken from Municipal Borough of Surbiton, with again its arms hanging from the stags' necks.

== International links ==
Although not officially 'twinned', The Royal Borough of Kingston has a partner city of Oldenburg in Germany and Gwanak-gu, an administrative subdivision of Seoul, in South Korea. Some road signs announce that Kingston is linked with Delft in the Netherlands but this official link has ended.

== Sport and leisure ==
The Borough of Kingston upon Thames has several football clubs in its area:

- Kingstonian, a Non-League football club who play at Imperial Fields, Mitcham
- Corinthian Casuals, a non-League club who play at King George's Field, Tolworth
- Chessington & Hook United, a non-League club who play at Chalky Lane, Chessington
- Chelsea F.C. Women, who play at the Kingsmeadow Stadium in WSL 1

Other sports:

- Old Kingstonaian Hockey Club is a field hockey club that competes in the London Hockey League.
- Old Cranleighan Hockey Club, Surbiton Hockey Club and Teddington Hockey Club are also in the area and compete in the Women's England Hockey League, the Men's England Hockey League and the London Hockey League.
