= Chessington South railway station =

National Rail station in London, England

Chessington South
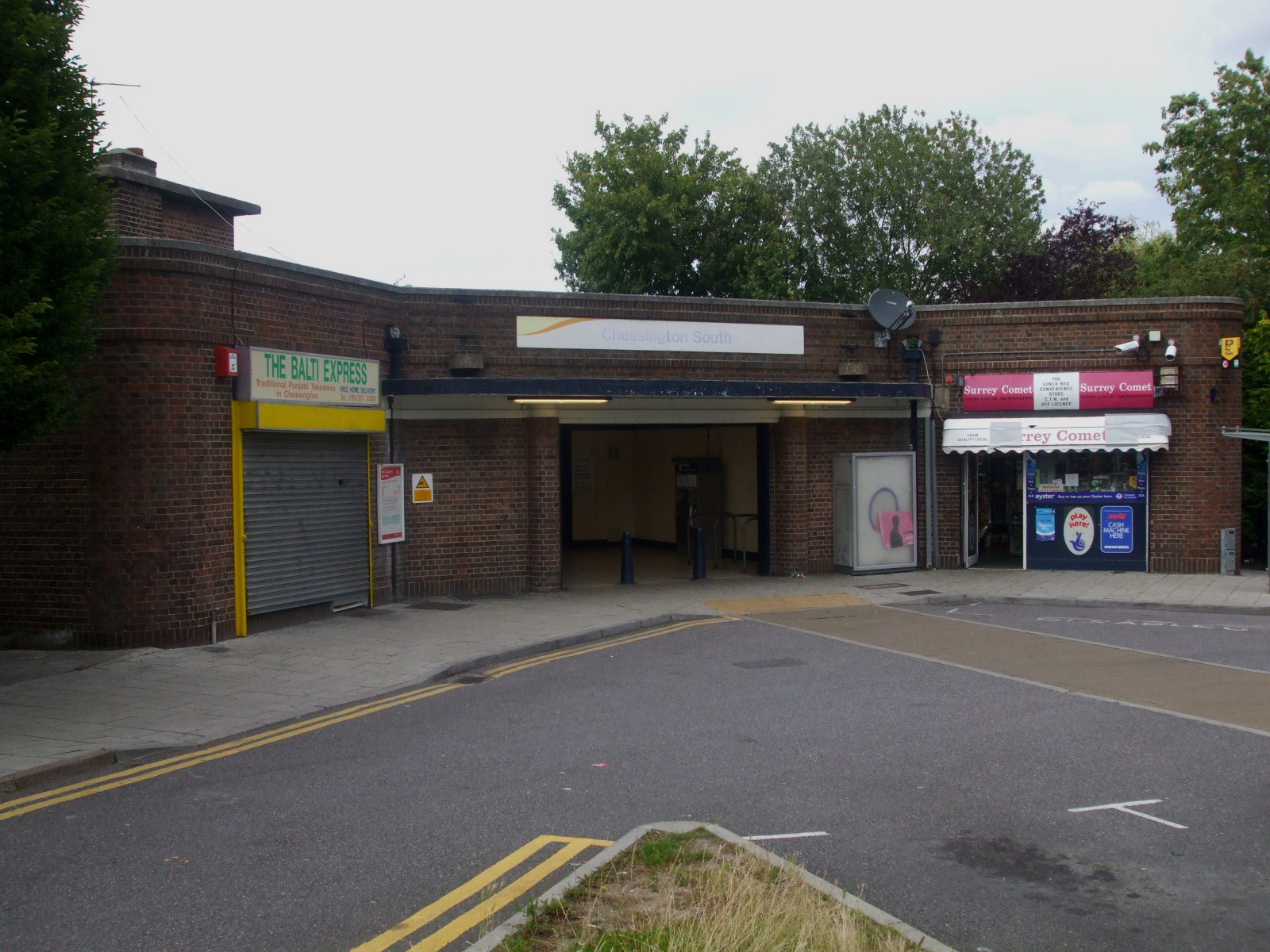
- Interactive map of Chessington South

General information
- Location: Chessington
- Local authority: Royal Borough of Kingston upon Thames
- Managed by: South Western Railway
- Station code: CSS
- DfT category: E
- Number of platforms: 2 (1 in use)
- Accessible: Yes
- Fare zone: 6

National Rail annual entry and exit
- 2020–21: ▼85,936
- 2021–22: ▲0.236 million
- 2022–23: ▲0.275 million
- 2023–24: ▲0.315 million
- 2024–25: ▲0.344 million

Railway companies
- Original company: Southern Railway

Key dates
- 28 May 1939: Opened

Other information
- External links: Departures; Facilities
- Coordinates: 51.3569°N 0.308°W

Chessington South railway station is in the Royal Borough of Kingston upon Thames in Greater London, England, and is the terminus of the Chessington Branch Line. It is served by South Western Railway, and is 13 miles 73 chains (22.4 km) down the line from London Waterloo, in London fare zone 6. It is the nearest railway station to Chessington World of Adventures and Chessington School.

== History ==
The station was built to a design of Southern Railway architect James Robb Scott and opened on 28 May 1939. It was intended as a through station on the line being built to Leatherhead. However, construction of the line stopped beyond Chessington South, never to be resumed, upon the outbreak of World War II and the up platform was ultimately never used for passenger trains, although the track is often used for stabling out of service trains during off-peak times. There was a goods yard beyond the passenger station. After the continuation to Leatherhead was abandoned, part of line south of the station was used from the mid-1960s to the end of the 1980s for a coal concentration depot. The line and the sidings to the coal depot were unused and hidden by trees for many years, but in 2021 the land was cleared and tracks relaid for an aggregates depot.

The ticket office is at track level. There are two automated ticket machine at street level.

In 2019 a ramp was added to the station, providing step-free access to the single platform from street level.

The disused platform is inaccessible, given there is no footbridge or subway connecting the platforms. It remains abandoned as surplus to requirements, as only two trains currently depart each hour.

== Services ==
All services at Chessington South are operated by South Western Railway.

The typical service on all days of the week is two trains per hour to and from London Waterloo via Wimbledon which start and terminate at Chessington South.

| Preceding station | National Rail | Following station |
|---|---|---|
| Chessington North | South Western Railway Chessington Branch Line | Terminus |

== Connections ==
London Buses routes 71 and 467 serve the station during the day, and route N65 at night.
