= Southborough High School =

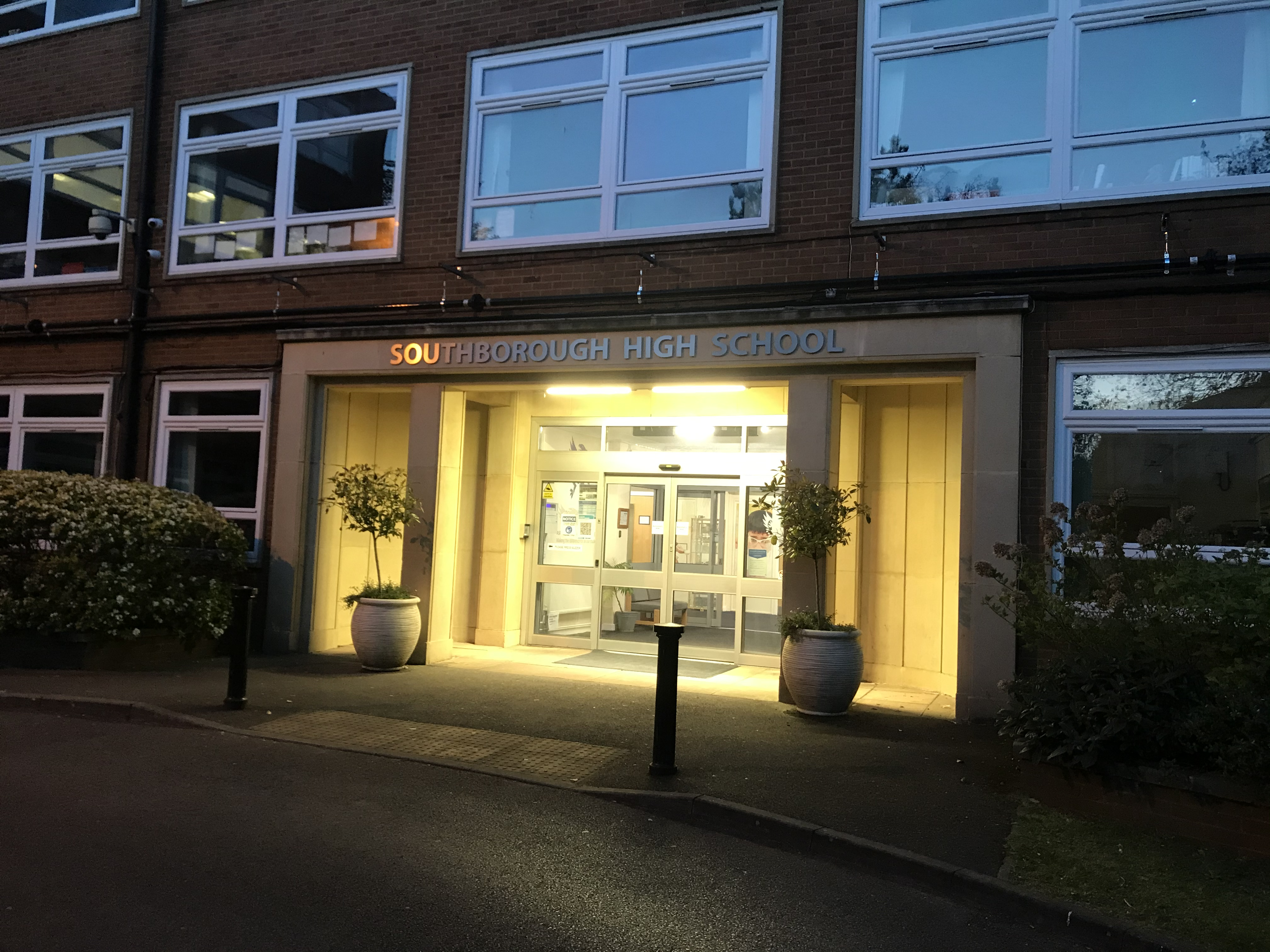

Location
- Hook Road; Surbiton, Greater London, KT6 5AS; England; 51°22′32″N 0°18′07″W

Information
- Type: Academy
- Motto: Aspiration, Commitment, Excellence
- Established: 1962; 64 years ago
- Department for Education URN: 137917 Tables
- Ofsted: Reports
- Head teacher: Niall Smith
- Gender: Boys, mixed sixth form
- Age: 11 to 18
- Enrolment: 772
- Website: http://www.southborough.kingston.sch.uk/

Southborough High School, commonly known as Southborough, is a boys secondary School with a mixed sixth form. Founded in 1962, it has academy status and is in Surbiton, Greater London. It was rated a grade 2 school (Good) in 2017 by Ofsted.

== About Southborough ==
Southborough Boys' School was built in 1960–1962, at the Ace of Spades (junction) on the A3, principally on the site of the former Ace of Spades Roadhouse, remnants of which can still be seen in the architecture of the buildings to the immediate north of the service station located next to the school. The Roadhouse and swimming pool complex were destroyed by fire in the early 1950s.

Originally categorised as a 'secondary modern school' when it opened in 1962, Southborough converted to Academy status in March 2012.

Southborough's GCSE results have been well above the national average for boys for many years. The school's GCSE English Baccalaureate figure is currently double the national average for boys. The school's KS2 – KS4 Value Added figure (2015) is 1005.7.

Since 2016 football and rugby academies have been included in the school's sixth form.

== Identity ==
The school was originally opened in 1962 as Southborough Boys' School, being a replacement for Tolworth Boys' School previously sharing the nearby premises occupied by Tolworth Girls' School. The first Headmaster was Mr. H. P. Giddy (a former Royal Marine). Southborough has students from across Kingston upon Thames such as Chessington, Surbiton, Tolworth and New Malden. Some of the students travel from far distances such as Battersea and Richmond by train, and the school provides a minibus service which goes from Barnes to the school.

The name 'Southborough' derives from the local Surrey settlement of the same name. Southborough is now mainly used in the name of the Southborough Conservation Area in Surbiton, a short distance away, but is also found in the name of the local Hook and Southborough Hockey Club and Hook with Southborough Parish Hall, the other side of the A3. Its meaning is Southern Hill, where the 'borough' ending means, unusually, hill rather than borough, coming from the Anglo-Saxon word 'beorg' (hill). It has the same meaning as the similar Swedish name Soderberg.

== Accessibility ==
The school is situated on a main road, Hook Road, Surbiton and off the A3 at the Hook, London Junction. The closest railway stations are Chessington North, Tolworth and Surbiton with frequent trains from Clapham Junction, Vauxhall, Wimbledon, Hinchley Wood, Hampton Court, Guildford, Raynes Park and others. Many local buses also run, including;

- 71 – Chessington to Kingston via Surbiton.
- 465 – Dorking to Kingston via Leatherhead, Malden Rushett, Chessington & Surbiton.
- 467 – Epsom to Hook via Ewell & Chessington's Copt Gilders.
- 671 – Tiffin Girls School to Chessington South & Chessington's Copt Gilders.
- K1 – New Malden to Kingston via Malden Manor & Tolworth.
- K4 – Mansfield Park, Chessington to Kingston Hospital via Surbiton, Kingston & Norbiton.

== Facilities ==
The school is sited on the edge of the A3 in a single four storey building. Facilities include the main hall, music suite, two gymnasiums, a fully equipped drama room, three IT suites and two apple mac suites, alongside a library housing over 10,000 books. The school owns a large field close to the school (entrance along Brook Rd), with sports pitches, as well as cricket nets and an astro turf pitch within the school's main grounds.
