= Scilly Isles, Surrey =

Roundabout in Elmbridge, Surrey, England

Coordinates: 51.37781°N 0.34904°W

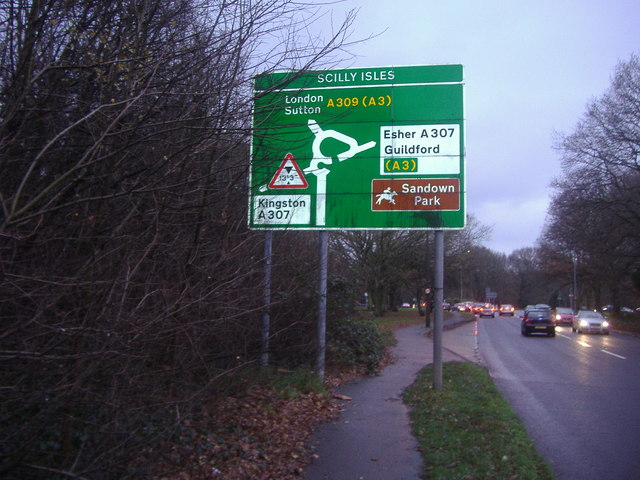
Road sign for the Scilly Isles roundabout

The Scilly Isles (/ˈsɪli/) is a double roundabout in Hinchley Wood, Surrey, between the English towns of Esher and Kingston upon Thames on the traditional route of the Portsmouth Road. The name is a corruption of "silly islands", a nickname given to the road system when it was built in the 1930s.

== History and notability ==
The junction was known since the 19th century as the location of a large pub named after a prominent aristocrat-soldier the Marquis of Granby. (The pub shut down in 2021 due to the COVID-19 pandemic.) The junction acquired its name during the 1930s when the then new Kingston by-pass road rejoined the original route of the Portsmouth Road that was then the equivalent to today's A3. The present road is termed the A307 and the A309 crosses this and links via a dualled section to the A3 road and the north. A series of roundabouts were built at the busy (for the 1930s) intersection, then called "traffic islands". The unfamiliar nature of the double roundabout caused it to be called the "silly islands", which became locally accepted as its name, but this soon evolved into the "Scilly Isles", copying the name of the islands to the west of Cornwall. This name, although intended to be disapproving, thus became an official name, visible on all approaches to the junction and the highest definition maps.

The nearby Sandown Park Racecourse hosts the annual Scilly Isles Novices' Chase. Littleworth Common and Ditton Marsh to either side are almost undeveloped commons, mostly covered by trees and grass/scrub respectively.

== Position ==
The Scilly Isles is located in the north-western proximity of the suburb of Hinchley Wood, which is signposted on the approaches to the junction. This area is in the north of the borough of Elmbridge, Surrey, around 2 miles from the Greater London boundary.

The junction is near to the centre of the parish of Weston Green, which is divided in terms of post towns between Esher and Thames Ditton, which is a village by the River Thames 1 mile (1.6 km) north-east.

== See also ==
- Isles of Scilly
- The Centre, Bristol
- Notable UK road junctions
