= A307 road =

Road in southwest London, and northwest Surrey

A307

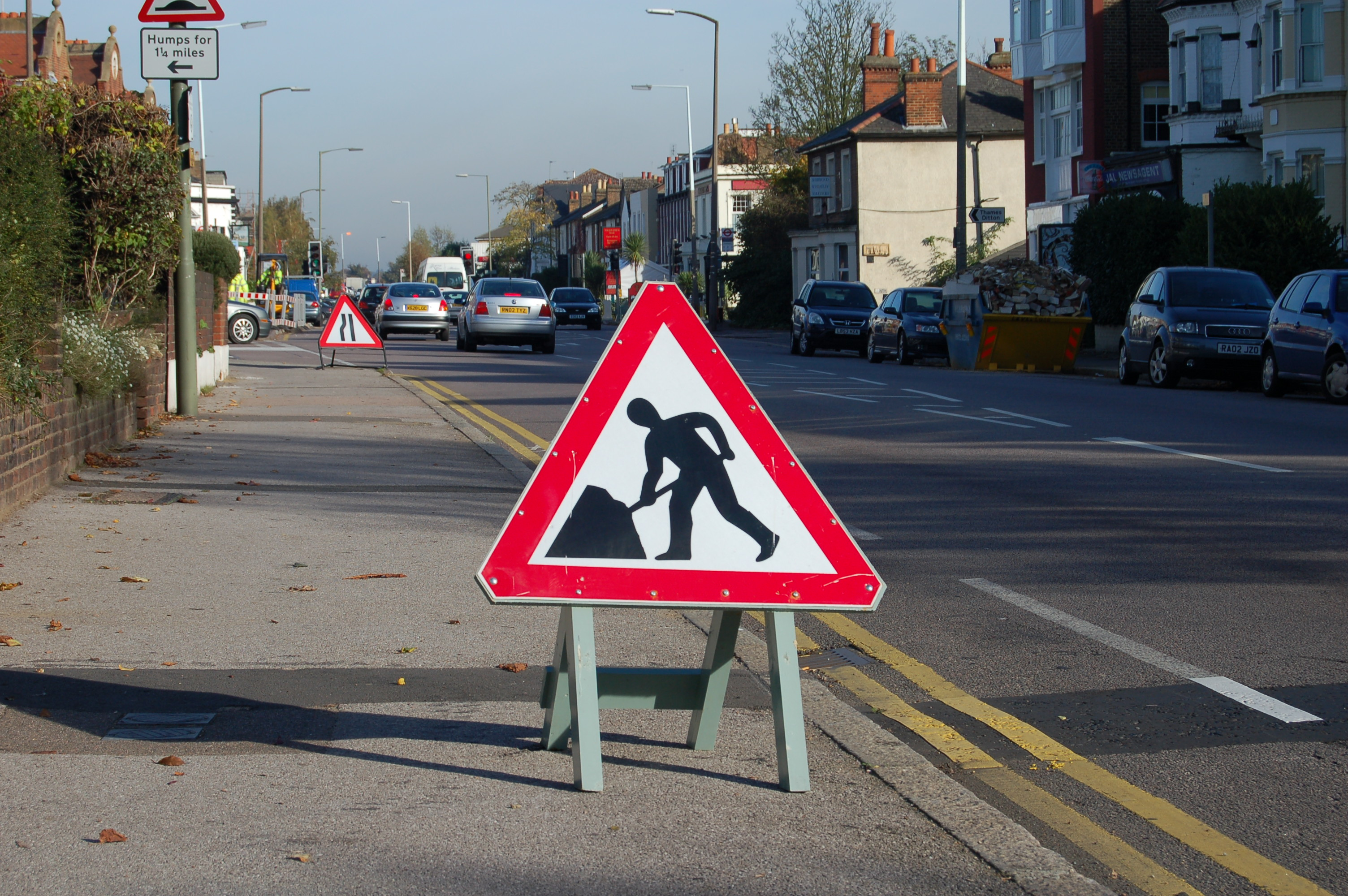
- The A307 Portsmouth Road running through Thames Ditton.

Route information
- Length: 13.2 mi (21.2 km)

Major junctions
- North end: Kew
- A205 A316 A305 A308 A240 A243 A309 A244 A245; A3
- South end: Cobham

Location
- Country: United Kingdom
- Constituent country: England
- Primary destinations: Richmond, Kingston upon Thames

Road network
- Roads in the United Kingdom; Motorways; A and B road zones
← A306	→ A308

The A307 road runs 13.2 miles (21.2 km) through SW London and NW Surrey. It is primary at the north-east end; the remainder is non-primary, generally superseded in the mid-twentieth century in two stages by newer alignments of the Portsmouth Road, the Kingston bypass and Esher bypass of the A3, which runs along a slightly oblique axis.

== Route ==
=== London Borough of Richmond upon Thames: Kew and Richmond ===
The road begins at the junction with the A205 South Circular Road beside Kew Green (51.4827°N 0.2869°W), where it is named Kew Road. It then runs towards Richmond upon Thames through the west of Kew. At the junction with the A316 in Richmond it becomes a non-primary A-road through the town centre then heads through Petersham where for fewer than 100 metres it kinks west and then travels south through Ham. A B-class road, the B353, leaves the A307 in Kew and runs around the town centre and up Richmond Hill and by-passing Richmond, before rejoining the A307 at Petersham.

=== Royal Borough of Kingston upon Thames: Kingston upon Thames, Surbiton and part of Long Ditton ===
It bisects the north of the town, before becoming the western half of the one-way system in Kingston upon Thames. Here it is briefly merged with the A308. It leads south to the northern end of the A240, for 200m travels west to the River Thames, and resuming south becomes at last the old version of the Portsmouth Road (which is also its name here). It runs next to the River Thames, heading through Surbiton. It passes a junction with the A243, shortly before exiting the borough at Seething Wells there next to Long Ditton.

=== Thames Ditton, Esher and Cobham, Surrey ===
The road now follows an almost straight south-west course (losing the Thames, which at Thames Ditton curves away to the north). It passes through Hinchley Wood, crossing the A309 at the Scilly Isles roundabout. It forms the High Street of Esher, crosses the A3 (new Portsmouth Road) by way of a bridge north of Cobham, before terminating near a junction of the A3 in Cobham (51.3321°N 0.4178°W), which is generally also known as Portsmouth Road.

== History and events ==
The A307 follows the old route of the Portsmouth Road, particularly the section south of the junction with the A308. Since two major projects of the 1930s and 1960s respectively the Portsmouth Road, the A3 (Portsmouth Road) of today, has been diverted away from towns/villages instead through buffer land 1 mile (1.6 km) or more from urban centres and is a tripled or dualled (duplicated as described at the time) in each direction.

Robert Clive ("Clive of India") diverted it slightly believing it ran too close to his house at Claremont, the landscape garden of which remains and which it still borders.

A watchman's box that also served as a village lock-up, dating from 1787, is next to the Fox & Duck in Petersham.

Responsibility for the north section, Kew Road and Richmond Road, passed from the crown to the Commissioner of Works under the Crown Lands Act 1851.

=== Petersham Hole ===
The A307 was closed during 1979 and 1980 for a total of almost 18 months by the repeated collapse of a sewer and fresh water culvert in the road's narrowest section which is in Petersham, an ordeal referred to as the Petersham Hole. The route has sometimes been used from a few hundred metres south of the Richmond Gate of Richmond Park to Kingston as part of the London-Surrey cycle classic events routes, depending on the availability of Park Road, Kingston which avoids the hairpin and sharper descent at Richmond Gate.
