= Ace of Spades (junction) =

Road junction in Hook in the Royal Borough of Kingston upon Thames

- Interactive map of Ace of Spades

Location
- Hook, Greater London
- Coordinates: 51.375138°N 0.303951°W
- Roads at junction: A3; A243; A309

Construction
- Type: Roundabout interchange
- Maintained by: Transport for London

Location in Royal Borough of Kingston upon Thames

The Ace of Spades junction is in Hook in the Royal Borough of Kingston upon Thames. It enables the A243 Hook Road to cross and link to the A3 Portsmouth Road, and two sliproads interface with, just west, the London end of the A309 Kingston Bypass which serves Esher and Hampton Court Bridge.

It takes its name from a once well-known 1930s roadhouse, a pioneer establishment, serving meals 24 hours a day in a restaurant with seating for up to 800, dancing until 3am, large outdoor swimming pool, a miniature golf course, polo ground, riding school and an airstrip. Acts such as Billie and Renée Houston as well as Collinson and Dean appeared there. Once spotted at the swimming pool was Diana Dors trying to teach her husband Dennis Hamilton to swim. This advanced motel fell into decline, and suffered a fire in 1955. Much of it has become a large tiling and kitchen-selection/parts shop. Its car park covers the former pool, perhaps filled in.

Later the Hook Underpass (cutting) was dug, the first underpass of this kind in the country so a model of it was displayed in the Science Museum in London. It initially had road heating (powered by two generators). In the months after opening it attracted motorcyclists keen to ride the underpass at high speed.

Today there is a traffic "black spot", during peaks, going northeast before the "underpass". The road reduces from three lanes to two. The speed limit reduces from 70 miles per hour (110 km/h) to 50 miles per hour (80 km/h), with the first of many Gatso speed enforcement cameras before the road bears to the right and under the bridge. Joining traffic from the A309 joins just before the underpass.
