= Seething Wells =

Coordinates: 51.39344°N 0.31310°W

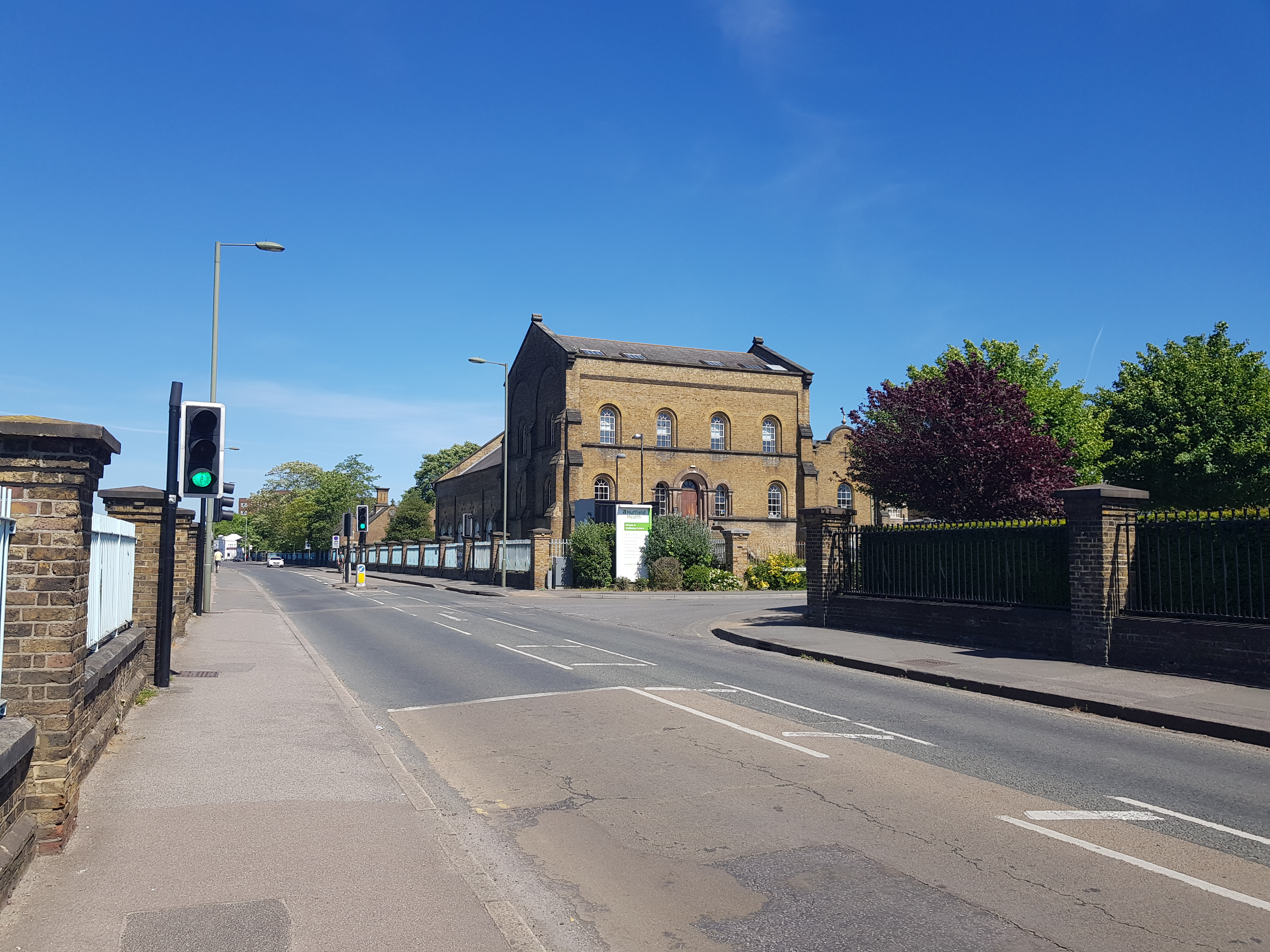
- Old waterworks building in Seething Wells, viewed from the A307

- Location within Greater London
- OS grid reference: TQ173674
- Ceremonial county: Greater London; Surrey
- Region: London
- Country: England
- Sovereign state: United Kingdom
- Post town: SURBITON
- Postcode district: KT6
- Police: Metropolitan
- Fire: London
- Ambulance: London
- UK Parliament: Kingston & Surbiton; Esher and Walton

Seething Wells is mostly a peripheral neighbourhood of southwest London within Surbiton in the Royal Borough of Kingston upon Thames – it extends slightly into Long Ditton in Surrey. Once a locally notable estate with one owner, when last in single-use ownership it had waterworks that treated and pumped water to large part's of London's conurbation (Note: Also called, mainly for London and other capitals in British England, "metropolis" especially in contemporary texts) from the Thames (1852-1992). It has a local arterial road which sits on the eastern cut bank of the Thames and still is named Portsmouth Road (Note: as served as the main link to that city before the A3(M) motorway was built) otherwise is mainly residential and its purposely lowered riverfront from that road is an informal wetland — the former Seething Wells filter beds.

== Etymology ==
Extract from one-inch scale Ordnance Survey map (1871-82). Dotted line denotes almost one half of the much smaller of the two waterworks forming this land within Long Ditton, all the rest lies in Surbiton.

The name is a gradual corruption of the original Siden Wells which appears on maps from the 18th century, recorded as the medicinal spring at Soothing Wells in a time-of-construction guide to the South Western railway and its neighbouring countryside. It denoted springs — reportedly warm springs of potable water.

== Geography ==
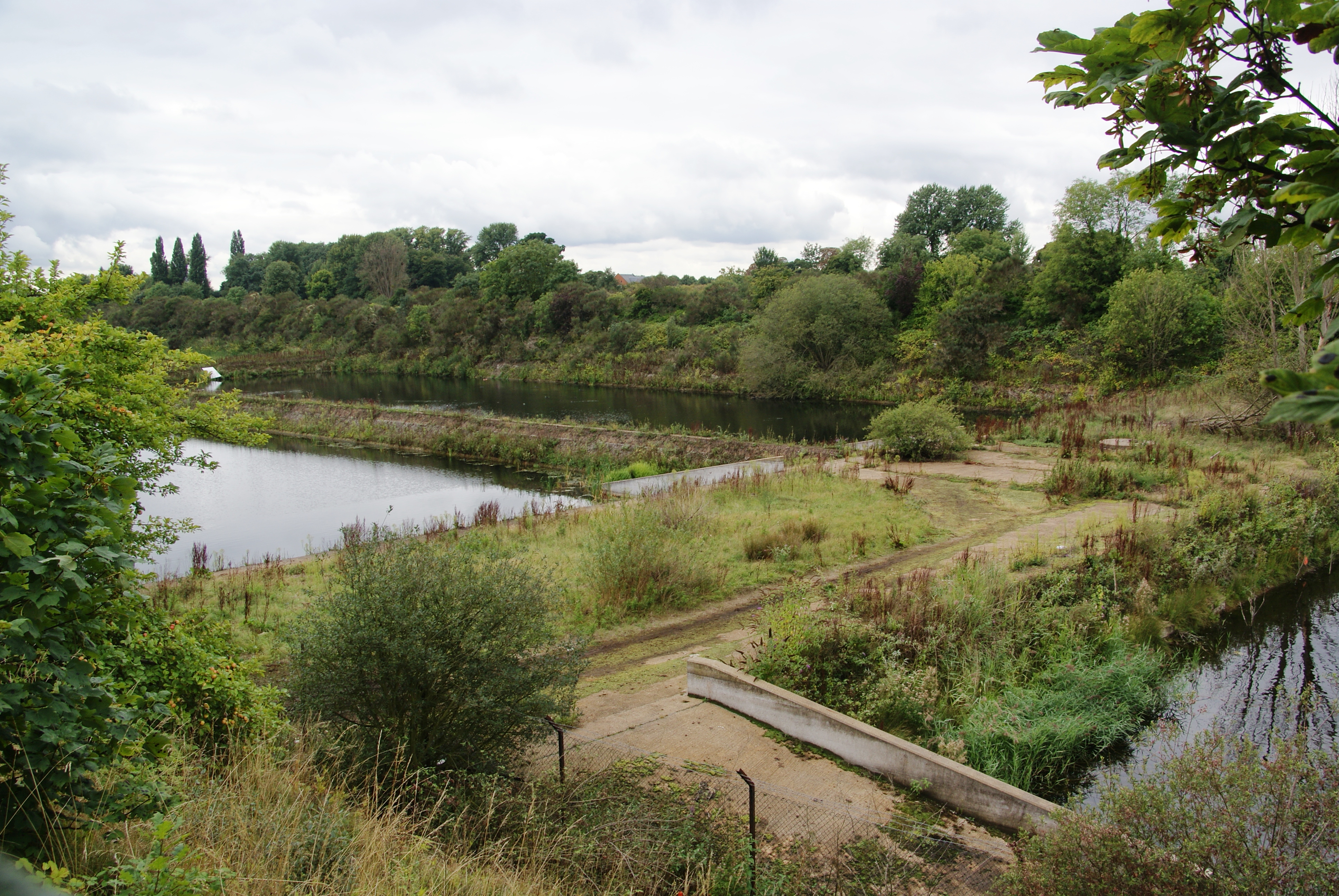
Seething Wells Filter Beds

Seething Wells having never been a chapelry, parish, tithing, electoral ward nor having a 'high street', can only be traced as land once used as its namesake waterworks on the southeast bank of the Thames facing Hampton Court Park. This land lies predominantly in Surbiton in Greater London; a fraction extends into Long Ditton in Surrey.

The Seething Wells area is now primarily residential, bordering Long Ditton Recreation Ground on the west side, and the Victoria Recreation Ground to the south. As well as many houses, the residential area contains a hall of residence for Kingston University, and an old waterworks building that has been converted inside into a gym. On the east side is a clock tower in a small area called Electric Parade. A small plot of land inside the residential area is still used for pumping water, operated by Thames Water.

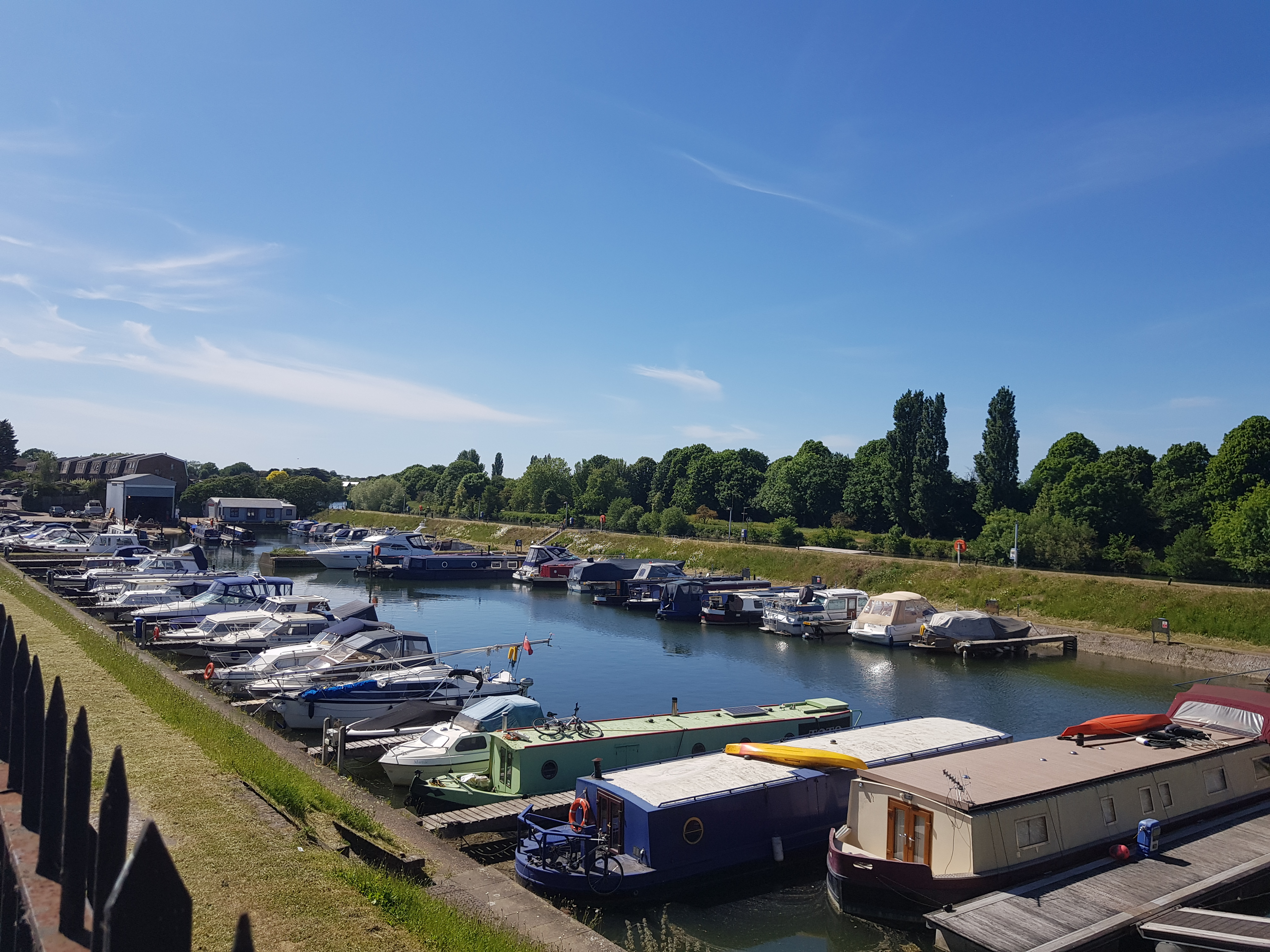
Marina in the west of Seething Wells

Towards the west end of the Seething Wells riverbank there is a marina. Midway along the riverbank there are 7, approximately 8 metre deep, decommissioned filter beds known as the Seething Wells Filter Beds (or less commonly, the Surbiton Filter Beds). At the southwest end of the filter bed site is a former coal wharf, with a former pump house building on top; near the site's centre there are a few pumps and pipes which are still in use. At the northeast section of the riverbank there is another marina, with Ravens Ait around 20 metres further northeast in the river.

The decommissioned filter beds are within the 0.23 km^{2} Riverside South Conservation Area which was identified in 2003.

== History ==
There is no evidence of any substantial early settlement of the area, although a few Neolithic, Bronze Age, and Roman artifacts were discovered during the waterworks' construction. From medieval times to the early 1800s the area is thought to have been home to several springs and wells (giving rise to the name "Seething Wells") that were purported to have healing properties. In 1808 the area was enclosed for the first time, by the Baron King, and by this point had become occupied by around 200 people.

The Metropolis Water Act 1852 prohibited the extraction of water for household purposes from the tidal Thames. The Lambeth Waterworks Company (LWC) anticipated this by choosing to build their works at Seething Wells in 1847, which were purchased around 1849, and completed and opened in 1852. Another company - the Chelsea Waterworks Company (CWC) - joined the LWC here, they started construction in 1854 and opened in 1856. The Lambeth Waterworks played a part in John Snow's investigations into cholera; he showed that homes supplied from further downriver by the Southwark and Vauxhall Waterworks Company had a cholera mortality rate 14 times that of homes supplied by Seething Wells, which was upriver, non-tidal, and hence had cleaner water.

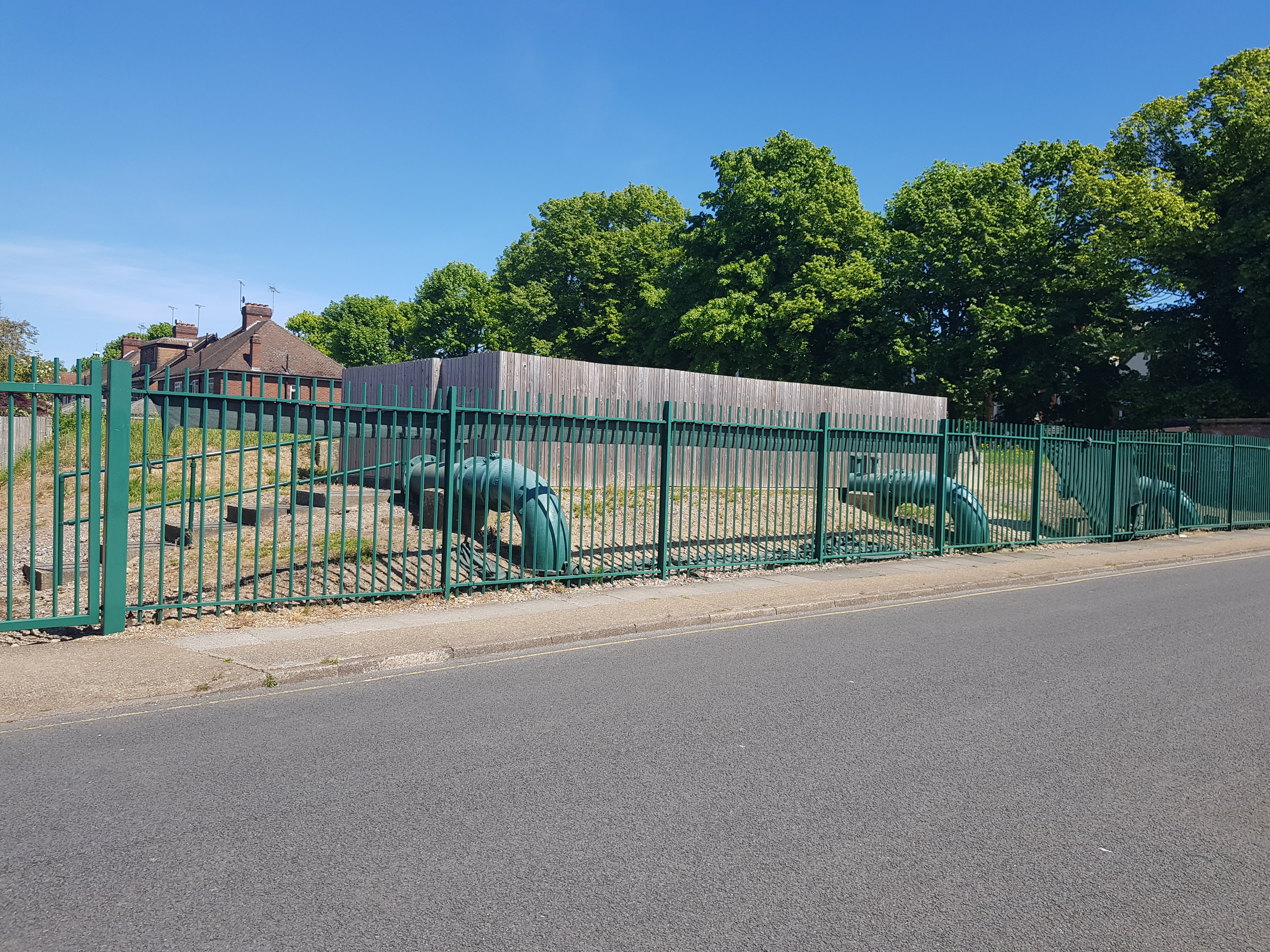
Remaining, functioning, surface level water pipes in the residential area

Despite carrying less disease, the inlets at Seething Wells sucked up more economically costly to treat silt with intake water than elsewhere because of turbulence caused by the twin-mouthed River Mole, The Rythe, and the sharp bend in the Thames. The LWC thus built a replacement intake at Molesey, and the CWC followed them there three years later, after attempting to build works opposite Hampton Court. The two companies retained their water treatment works away from that intake, at Seething Wells, side-by-side until they were incorporated into the Metropolitan Water Board in 1903, which was in turn incorporated into the Thames Water Authority in 1973. The works was privatized as part of Thames Water in 1989, and it was mostly decommissioned by Thames Water in 1992 — Seething Wells Lane pumping station now supplies water from the Thames Water Ring Main.

In the early 21st century, most of the old waterworks were turned into a residential area, apart from 7 decommissioned filter beds — the Seething Wells Filter Beds. Several Victorian waterworks buildings were converted into flats.

Electric Parade and the 130-year-old Victoria Recreation Park are not part of the estate. Electric Parade originated as a row of shops along the pavement; built around 1904-05 when electricity (Electric) first arrived in Surbiton, and trailblazed this new technology. The original shops all closed and were replaced with new ones within 15–20 years. Later on, the road was renamed to Brighton Road A243, and Electric Parade now refers to the narrow road and area facing the backs of these shops. The clock tower at the northwest end of the road bore a globe on top, but it was damaged by a V-1 flying bomb in WWII and replaced with a bell.

== Transport ==
Seething Wells is served on behalf of Transport for London, via the Electric Parade and Victoria Recreation Ground stops on the K3 bus route, run by London United Busways. There are also the Seething Wells Kingston University Campus, St Leonard's Road, and Cleaveland Road bus stops, run by several other private companies.

The land here is 0.5 miles (0.80 km) from Surbiton railway station.

In mainly tour boat use, there are passenger ferries just north of Seething Wells, principally to Hampton Court Palace and Richmond, with onward links to London.

== Politics ==
Seething Wells is part of the Kingston and Surbiton constituency for elections to the House of Commons of the United Kingdom.

Seething Wells is part of the St Mark's and Seething Wells ward for elections to Kingston upon Thames London Borough Council.

== See also ==
- London water supply infrastructure
- Long Ditton
- Surbiton
