= Claygate railway station =

Railway station in Surrey, England

Coordinates: 51°21′40″N 0°20′53″W

Claygate
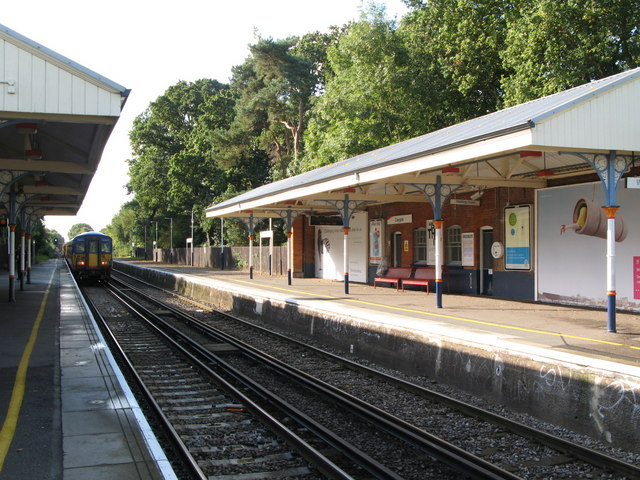

General information
- Location: Claygate, Elmbridge; England
- Grid reference: TQ150637
- Managed by: South Western Railway
- Platforms: 2

Other information
- Station code: CLG
- Classification: DfT category D

Passengers
- 2020/21: ▼91,254
- 2021/22: ▲0.305 million
- 2022/23: ▲0.411 million
- 2023/24: ▲0.463 million
- 2024/25: ▲0.517 million
Location
Notes
- Passenger statistics from the Office of Rail and Road

Claygate railway station serves the village of Claygate, in Surrey, England. It is on the New Guildford Line from London Waterloo to Guildford.

The station, and all trains serving it, are operated by South Western Railway. It is 15 miles 11 chains (24.4 km) down the line from Waterloo.

== Services ==
All services at Claygate are operated by South Western Railway using Class 450 and Class 701 EMUs.

The typical off-peak service in trains per hour is:

- 2 tph to London Waterloo via Wimbledon
- 2 tph to Guildford

On Sundays, the service is reduced to hourly in each direction.

Preceding station	National Rail	Following station
Hinchley Wood	South Western Railway New Guildford Line	Oxshott

== Immediate surroundings ==
The station is beside the midpoint and village centre of Claygate. It is the closest station to no other settlements.
