= Hinchley Wood School =

Location
- Claygate Lane; Hinchley Wood; Esher, Surrey, KT10 0AQ; England; 51.379°N 0.332°W

Information
- Type: Academy
- Motto: Inspiring Learners
- Established: 1947; 79 years ago
- Local authority: Surrey
- Specialist: Music College
- Department for Education URN: 137855 Tables
- Ofsted: Reports
- Headteacher: Ben Bartlett
- Gender: Mixed
- Age: 11 to 18
- Enrolment: 1,150
- Colours: Maroon, white, black
- Website: hinchleywoodschool.co.uk

Hinchley Wood School is a secondary school with academy status in Hinchley Wood, (Note: A geographically small suburban village which was traditionally part of Thames Ditton but which is associated in economic dependence today more with its post town, Esher, the largest settlement in the east of Elmbridge.) Surrey, England.

== Overview ==
Hinchley Wood School admits pupils from the age of eleven to between sixteen and eighteen. The school has a Sixth Form which provides a total of 20 AS level/A level subjects: one year and two year non-workplace courses respectively.

Next to the grounds is Hinchley Wood Primary School, one of the three main contributing schools, the other equal status partnership schools being Long Ditton St Mary's Junior School and Thames Ditton Junior School. A lesser partner is Claygate Primary School as currently preference affecting half of Claygate applies foremost: a roughly eastern division, which is subject to removal under pending proposals to rely more on certain Claygate feeder schools as the secondary feeder schools. Regard is also had to a geographical catchment based on homes.

=== Music performance specialisation ===
Hinchley Wood School has Music College specialism. Government statutory reports on the school praise its jazz band: Banda di Jazz and samba band which hold regular concerts, and overall variety of music taught and equipment.

=== Sustainability technology ===
The school's Sustainability Group supports for instance its Green Flag Award balancing trees, grass, wildlife, hardstanding/buildings and outdoor sports. Allowing for reduction in fossil fuel use and in daytime energy costs, the school has a large array of photovoltaic cells which also lowers carbon dioxide emissions.

== History ==
Kingston Day Commercial School and the Hinchley Wood Central County Council School are its predecessors on the existing site, which merged in 1947.

The Central Council School opened on 4 March 1940 with 360 children drawn exclusively from five schools in Thames Ditton, Claygate and Long Ditton; there was no primary school in Hinchley Wood until after the war, which in itself was a breakaway area as was Claygate, from Thames Ditton. The students were aged 10 – 14 years reflecting the statutory minimum leaving age at that time and the school had nine forms of 40 children each.

In 1996 after an absence of many decades the school successfully bid for funds (based on local need and teaching experience) with Surrey County Council to resume education in a sixth form.

== Specialist needs ==
The school has a lower degree of speech, language and communications needs ('SCLN') and SEN children than nearby schools. Children who struggle in these area receive extra support wherever achievable within the school's financial constraints and it is natural that these children are totally integrated into all aspects of the school community.

In 2012, 3.6% of pupils were supported by school action plus or with a statement of SEN, compared with the national average of 8.1%, a decrease of 0.4% on the previous year. The school was in the news in 2021 due to a disability discrimination case where the school was accused of unfair treatment towards a student with autism spectrum disorder (ASD). The school has also been accused of attempting to 'off role' students, excluding them with the aim of preserving the reputation of the school.

== Educational equipment and spaces ==
=== Academic ===
The classrooms and specialist facilities such as the technology and food rooms incorporate technology in teaching spaces to emulate that used in leading employers' workplaces and/or further education. All halls and rooms are purpose-built for the size of the school and their intended use.

=== Music and performance ===
The school has regular concerts. The sixth form take the main role in arranging their own local and West End theatre trips and it has a dedicated stage for stage productions.

=== Sports ===
Clubs and sessions within the timetable are allocated for fitness an wellbeing, organised sport and the study of physical education

- Football, rugby and cricket pitches
- Netball pitch
- Games halls and courts
- 2010s completed fully equipped gym and sports hall.

== Assessment ==
The school was judged Outstanding in 2013.

== Notable alumni ==
- Gemma Bissix, actress
- Nik Tzanev, footballer for AFC Wimbledon
- Theo Randall, chef
- David Wiffen, singer-songwriter
- Richard Pennycook, retail industry leader, CEO of Co-op Group
- Edward Woodward, actor
- Michael Cox, football writer
- B S Johnson, writer
- Rhea Norwood, actress
- Bryn Bradley, professional rugby union player
- Archie Procter, professional footballer
- Sam Spink, professional rugby player

== Notes and references ==
Notes
