= KT postcode area =

Postcode area within the United Kingdom

Kingston upon Thames
- Postcode area
- Location within the United Kingdom
- Coordinates: 51.358°N 0.344°W
- Sovereign state: United Kingdom
- Postcode area: KT
- Postcode area name: Kingston upon Thames
- Post towns: 19
- Postcode districts: 24
- Postcode sectors: 92
- Postcodes (live): 14,168
- Postcodes (total): 22,311
- Statistics as at May 2020

The KT postcode area, also known as the Kingston upon Thames postcode area, is a group of 24 postcode districts in England, within 19 post towns. These cover boroughs in south-west Greater London and several boroughs in north-east Surrey.

Mail for this area is sorted at the Jubilee Mail Centre in Hounslow. In Greater London the area covers most of the Royal Borough of Kingston upon Thames and small parts of the boroughs of Merton, Richmond upon Thames and Sutton, while in Surrey it covers virtually all of the borough of Elmbridge, most of the borough of Epsom and Ewell, the northwestern part of the borough of Reigate and Banstead, the northern part of the Mole Valley district, the northeastern parts of the boroughs of Guildford and Woking and the southern part of the borough of Runnymede, as well as a very small part of the borough of Spelthorne.

== Coverage ==
The approximate coverage of the postcode districts:

Note: In early 2027, Guildford, Runnymede and Spelthorne will be replaced by the new West Surrey unitary authority, and Elmbridge, Epsom & Ewell, Mole Valley and Reigate & Banstead by the East Surrey unitary authority.

Postcode district	Post town	Coverage	Local authority area(s)
KT1	KINGSTON UPON THAMES	Kingston upon Thames, Hampton Wick, part of Norbiton	Kingston upon Thames, Richmond upon Thames
KT2	KINGSTON UPON THAMES	Kingston upon Thames, Canbury, Coombe, parts of Norbiton and Richmond Park	Kingston upon Thames, Richmond upon Thames
KT3	NEW MALDEN	Motspur Park, New Malden, parts of Old Malden and Raynes Park	Kingston upon Thames, Merton
KT4	WORCESTER PARK	Worcester Park, Cuddington, parts of Old Malden and Stoneleigh	Epsom and Ewell, Kingston upon Thames, Merton, Sutton
KT5	SURBITON	Berrylands, part of Surbiton, part of Tolworth	Kingston upon Thames
KT6	SURBITON	Surbiton, Tolworth, part of Long Ditton, Seething Wells	Elmbridge, Kingston upon Thames
KT7	THAMES DITTON	part of Long Ditton, Thames Ditton, part of Weston Green	Elmbridge, Kingston upon Thames
KT8	EAST MOLESEY; WEST MOLESEY	East Molesey, West Molesey, Hampton Court Palace and most of its Park, Bushy Park playground, Hampton Court neighbourhood (see Hampton), Ash Island	Elmbridge, Richmond upon Thames
KT9	CHESSINGTON	Chessington, Malden Rushett, Hook, part of Long Ditton	Elmbridge, Kingston upon Thames
KT10	ESHER	Esher, Claygate, Hinchley Wood, part of Weston Green	Elmbridge
KT11	COBHAM	Cobham, Stoke d'Abernon, Downside, Hatchford, parts of Wisley, Ockham and Hersham	Elmbridge, Guildford, Mole Valley
KT12	WALTON-ON-THAMES	Walton-on-Thames, Hersham, Whiteley Village, a café in Spelthorne	Elmbridge, Spelthorne
KT13	WEYBRIDGE	Weybridge, Oatlands, Saint George's Hill, Hamm Court	Elmbridge, Runnymede
KT14	WEST BYFLEET	Byfleet, West Byfleet	Elmbridge, Runnymede, Woking
KT15	ADDLESTONE	Addlestone, New Haw, Woodham	Runnymede, Woking
KT16	CHERTSEY	Chertsey, Ottershaw, Longcross, Lyne, Chertsey Bridge Road & 1-31 Abbeyfields in part of historical Littleton/Laleham that is in a Shepperton ward.	Runnymede, Spelthorne
KT17	EPSOM	Epsom, Ewell, part of Stoneleigh	Epsom and Ewell, Reigate and Banstead, Sutton
KT18	EPSOM	Epsom, Tattenham Corner, Headley, Langley Vale	Epsom and Ewell, Mole Valley, Reigate and Banstead
KT19	EPSOM	Epsom, West Ewell, Horton, Longmead, part of Stoneleigh	Epsom and Ewell
KT20	TADWORTH	Tadworth, Kingswood, Lower Kingswood, Walton-on-the-Hill, Burgh Heath, Mogador, Box Hill	Mole Valley, Reigate and Banstead
KT21	ASHTEAD	Ashtead	Mole Valley
KT22	LEATHERHEAD	Leatherhead, Oxshott, Fetcham	Elmbridge, Mole Valley
KT23	LEATHERHEAD	Great Bookham, Little Bookham	Guildford, Mole Valley
KT24	LEATHERHEAD	West Horsley, East Horsley, Effingham	Guildford, Mole Valley

== Map ==
KT postcode area map, showing postcode districts in red and post towns in grey text, with links to nearby CR, GU, RH, SL, SM, SW and TW postcode areas.

== See also ==
- Postcode Address File
- List of postcode areas in the United Kingdom
