= Long Ditton =

Suburb in Elmbridge, Surrey, England

Coordinates: 51.385°N 0.321°W

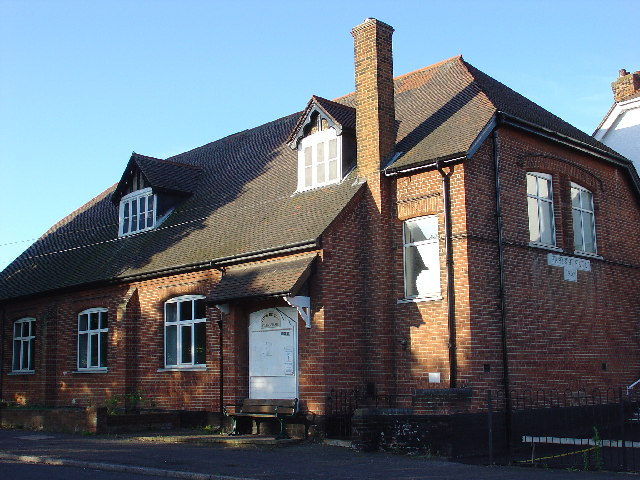
- The Village Hall

- Location within Surrey
- Area: 2.14 km^{2} (0.83 sq mi)
- Population: 6,343 (2011 census)
  - Density: 2,964/km^{2} (7,680/sq mi)
- OS grid reference: TQ169664
- Civil parish: n/a
- District: Elmbridge
- Shire county: Surrey
- Region: South East
- Country: England
- Sovereign state: United Kingdom
- Post town: Surbiton
- Postcode district: KT6
- Post town: Thames Ditton
- Postcode district: KT7
- Dialling code: 020
- Police: Surrey
- Fire: Surrey
- Ambulance: South East Coast
- UK Parliament: Esher and Walton

Long Ditton is a residential suburb in the borough of Elmbridge, Surrey, England on the boundary with the Royal Borough of Kingston upon Thames, London. In medieval times it was a village, occupying a narrow strip of land. Neighbouring settlements include Hinchley Wood, Thames Ditton and Surbiton.

Its northernmost part is 1.5 miles (2.4 km) south-west of central Kingston upon Thames, 11.3 miles from Charing Cross, and 15 miles (24 km) north-east of Guildford. It is divided in two by the South West Main Line and is bordered by a straight east–west spur road to meet the A3 in a cutting to the south. The old Portsmouth Road passes by the River Thames in the northern end of the village, and the riverbank here is privately owned.

In both local economy and public transport, the high street and railway stations at Hinchley Wood and Surbiton are the nearest such amenities.

== History ==
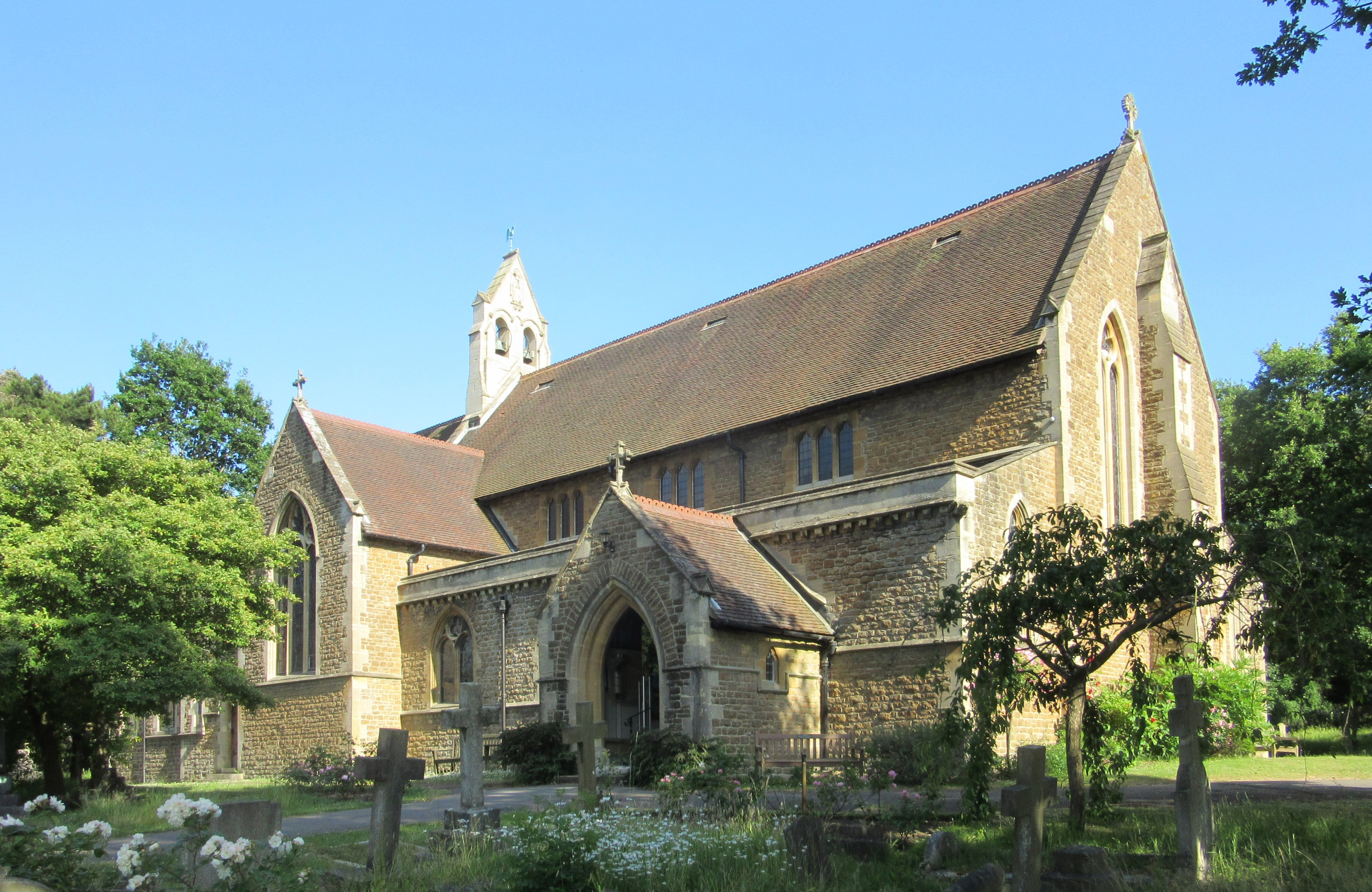
St Mary's Church was built in 1880

Ditton was a Saxon settlement which, by the Domesday Book, was a single ecclesiastical parish but split in two, as it remains. This split was between the riverside manor and parish of Thames Ditton, and the longer, eastern area, Long Ditton, which is a long rectangle of land extending from developed land by the River Thames to Ditton Hill. Nowadays Ditton Hill reaches beyond the wide A3 and A309 as far as Woodstock Lane South, much of which is in Claygate parish (and has an Esher postal address).

Two Dittons appear in the Domesday Book of 1086 and were written as Ditone and Ditune. The one that became known as Long Ditton was held by Robert Picot from (i.e. under) Richard Fitz Gilbert. The one that became known as Thames Ditton was held by Wadard under Bishop Odo. Long Ditton's Domesday assets were: 4 hides; 1 church, 1 mill worth 9s, 3½ ploughs, woodland for 15 hogs, 1 house in Southwark paying 500 herrings. It rendered £2 10s 0d.

Henry I granted all four chapelries neighbouring Kingston to Merton Priory, therefore it is uncertain whether the manor had a church or chapel at Long Ditton in that period. Until the early 20th century the parish had two non-contiguous parts, Long Ditton proper and an exclave in Tolworth. A strip of Kingston parish, its hamlet of Hook, lay between the two parts. The western portion, Long Ditton proper, had 896 acres (363 ha) and had near-identical boundaries to today's ecclesiastical parish.

In 1565 the manor was bought by George Evelyn, whose family produced gunpowder here for several generations, with gunpowder mills proliferating across Long Ditton and beyond. The Evelyns bought up much of the country that was heavily involved in the English Civil War, using the profits from gunpowder. George's grandson John Evelyn, who gained posthumous fame for his Diary, had to flee the country during the Civil War as swathes of family land fell awkwardly between Royalist and Parliamentarian strongholds. It was John who gleaned further prestige for the family name with his assimilation into the Royal Court of Charles II. When St Mary's Church was rebuilt in 1880, and monuments erected to commemorate local dignitaries, there were few other Long Ditton figures to celebrate, and the place became something of an Evelyn shrine.

In 1951 the civil parish had a population of 4007. On 1 April 1974 the parish was abolished.

=== St Mary's Church ===
The original church dated in part from the 12th century, with the earliest recorded rector being in 1166. By the 18th century the church had fallen into a bad state of decay and in 1778 a replacement was built on the same site, of a small Greek cross plan, built of brick. This was itself replaced by the present Church of England parish church in 1880. Designed by George Edmund Street and built next to the 18th-century church, it is primarily of buff-covered coursed marble stone with bath stone dressings overlying this in part, forming decorative arches. Remains of the 18th-century church can be seen in the churchyard's garden of rest which contains church floor memorials to the Evelyn family, with only one of its memorials moved to the present church building. Both the current and the remains of the 18th-century church are Grade II listed.

By the early 20th century the rectory had become derelict and was demolished. Its greater part was half-timber; it is pictured in Malden's A History of the County of Surrey, and probably dated from the 16th century.

People buried in the churchyard include global businessman and civil structural engineer Terence Patrick O'Sullivan, aircraft design engineer Sir Sydney Camm, Indian Army General Sir Orfeur Cavenagh, Austin Partner, a victim of the sinking of the Titanic. and John Wimble architect.

== Demography ==
A small part of the electoral ward, Long Ditton, was in the 2000s exchanged, including adding to Hinchley Wood (south of Hinchley Wood railway station).

The Long Ditton ward's population at the 2011 census was 6,343 living in 2,504 households. The total area was unchanged from ten years before at 214 hectares (530 acres) and the density had increased to 27.2 to 29.6 persons per hectare.

== Geography ==
The place is one of only two small portions of Elmbridge that is part of a post town outside its area, in this case, Surbiton which is in the neighbouring borough of Kingston upon Thames.

=== Soil and elevation ===
Long Ditton's soil is chiefly London clay, but to the north is Thames alluvial topsoil, gravel and sand, and it contains two patches of Bagshot Sand in the southern part.

== Economy ==
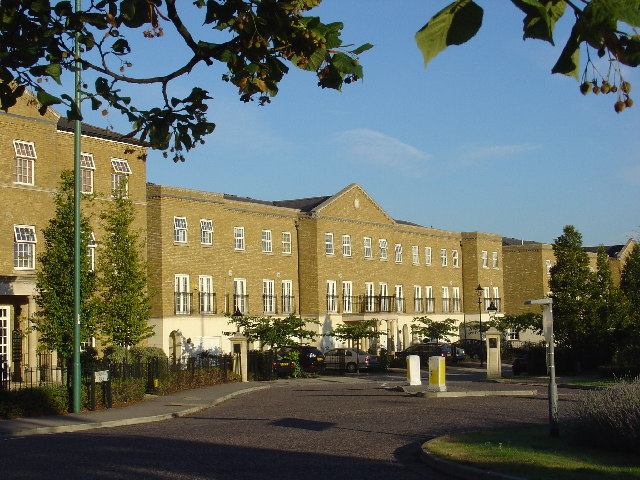
Chadwick Place, a 21st-century development by the London border and in the closest part of Long Ditton to Surbiton railway station which has a non-stopping service to London

Residential estates have been built on Long Ditton's former agricultural land, and it has become a dormitory settlement, and a satellite suburb to Esher, Kingston upon Thames and Surbiton. The nearest railway stations are Thames Ditton, Surbiton and Hinchley Wood. Long Ditton is also served by buses.

It can be claimed that Long Ditton has retained its village character: it has a village hall and a cricket club. It is a clustered village, which has now developed its riverside. Modest green spaces are interspersed with housing in the area; they are principally recreation grounds and do not form buffer zones with other settlements, except some commercial plant nurseries and garden centre businesses which separate Long Ditton from Claygate.

== Residents' Association ==
The Long Ditton Residents' Association (LDRA – www.longditton.org) is a non-political body whose aims are to preserve Long Ditton from overdevelopment, maintain its character, improve its amenities and defend its remaining surrounding Metropolitan Green Belt.

== Demography and housing ==
2011 Census Homes
| Output area | Detached | Semi-detached | Terraced | Flats and apartments | Caravans/temporary/mobile homes | Shared between households |
|---|---|---|---|---|---|---|
| (ward) | 703 | 706 | 669 | 419 | 7 | 0 |

The average level of accommodation in the region composed of detached houses was 28%, the average that was apartments was 22.6%.

| Output area | Population | Households | % Owned outright | % Owned with a loan | hectares |
|---|---|---|---|---|---|
| (ward) | 6,343 | 2,504 | 33 | 44 | 214 |

The proportion of households in the settlement who owned their home outright compares to the regional average of 35.1%. The proportion who owned their home with a loan compares to the regional average of 32.5%. The remaining % is made up of rented dwellings (plus a negligible % of households living rent-free).

== Notable residents ==
- Trevor Bowring (1887–1908), first-class cricketer, was born at Long Ditton.
- Sydney Camm (1893–1966), aeronautical engineer and aeroplane designer

== Notes and references ==
References
