= A308 road =

Road in England

A308

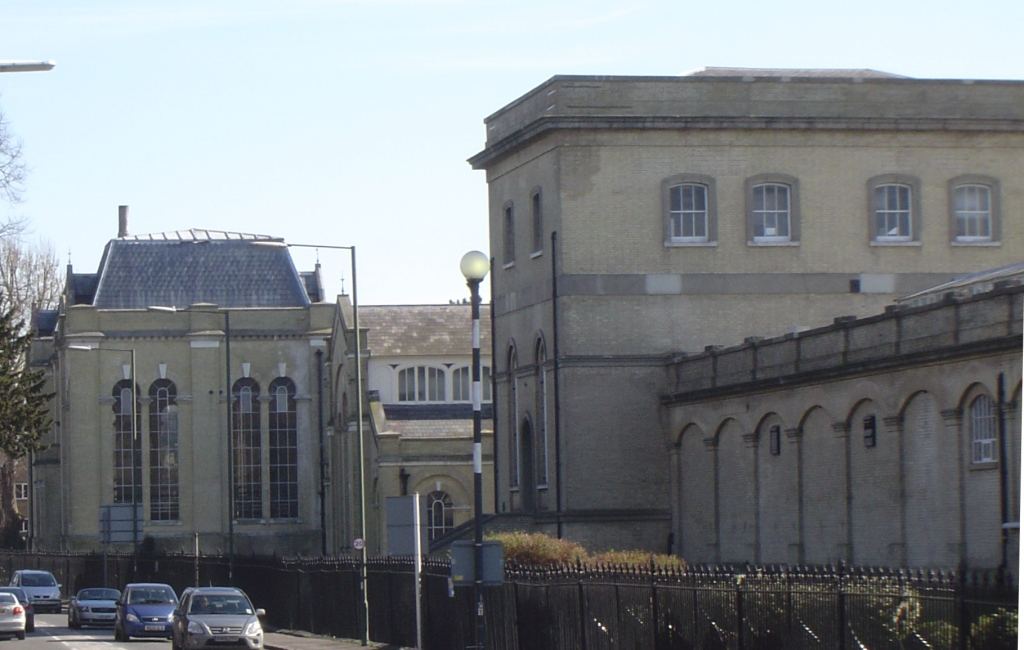
- The A308 at Hampton, beside the district's water works.

Route information
- Length: 33.75 mi (54.32 km)

Major junctions
- East end: Brompton
- A4 A3220 A217 A219; A3 A238 A2043 A307 A310 A309 A311 A316; M3 A244; A30 A3044 A320 M25 A328 A332 A355 A330; M4; A4 A404
- West end: Bisham

Location
- Country: United Kingdom
- Primary destinations: Kingston upon Thames, Staines-upon-Thames, Maidenhead

Road network
- Roads in the United Kingdom; Motorways; A and B road zones
| ← A307 | → A309 |

The A308 is a road in England in two parts. The first part runs from Central London to Putney Bridge. The second part runs from just beyond Putney Heath to Bisham, Berkshire. It traces four, roughly straight lines, to stay no more than 3 miles (4.8 km) from the Thames. It is a dual carriageway where it is furthest from that river, in Spelthorne, Surrey and forms one of the motorway spurs to the large town of Maidenhead. Other key settlements served are Fulham, Kingston (London), Staines upon Thames, Windsor and a minor approach to Marlow

== Central London ==
=== Kensington and Chelsea ===
The South Kensington to Fulham section starts at the A4 road opposite Brompton Oratory and follows Fulham Road south-west past Chelsea and Westminster Hospital, where it jumps south a block to takeover the Kings Road.

=== Hammersmith and Fulham ===
Through broad Fulham which traditionally, as bolstered by its associated London postcode, covers half of the borough, the road becomes New Kings Road, before it ends at the A219 road (Fulham Palace Road), 100m north of Putney Bridge.

== Outer London ==
=== Kingston upon Thames ===
The hiatus in the road which is Putney and Putney Heath is a subsumation into the A219 road and then into the A3. The bulk of the road starts, after. It runs from Kingston Vale's Robin Hood Gate roundabout. The entrance to Richmond Park here was closed to motor vehicles in 2003.

The road is named Kingston Vale then Kingston Hill until it falls past Kingston Hospital to becomes London Road. Immediately after snaking through central Kingston upon Thames as part of the one-way system, the road passes through a tunnel underneath the John Lewis Kingston department store, before crossing the River Thames at Kingston Bridge where it has another roundabout.

=== Richmond upon Thames ===
The A308 in this borough is called Hampton Court Road, briefly Thames Street and then Upper Sunbury Road. It occupies a space carved out of the Royal Estate for it between Bushy Park and Hampton Court Park, and passes Hampton Court Palace including the roundabout opposite the Palace Gates, before continuing west through broad Hampton, passing its prominent parish church and waterworks to exit Greater London.

== Surrey ==
The largely straight road from Hampton Court was surfaced and tolled in the 1780s by the Hampton and Staines Turnpike Trust. In the west its buildings were set back with gardens and therefore it was widened in Spelthorne in the 1920s.

As Staines Road East, the A308 winds past Kempton Park Racecourse, Sunbury-on-Thames and adopts instead of south-west followed after Kingston by west, the direction WNW, allowing it to meet Junction 1 of the M3/the A316 at the Sunbury Cross area also within Sunbury on Thames. On this line, it passes the Sunbury Common part of that town and the south side of the slightly larger town of Ashford, as Staines Road West and a dual carriageway, passing the Queen Mary Reservoir to form the by-pass to the large town of Staines-upon-Thames, after which it goes back to single carriageway to turn briefly south-west to take the high street roads network, rather than a straight continuation, which becomes the A30, then ends this street as Clarence Street, crosses the Thames (for a second time) at Staines Bridge, and resumes its main third-part orientation. It crosses the M25 motorway, that has a large cross-river junction at Junction 13, north of Egham.

The road turns north-west, as Windsor Road, in the middle of Runnymede's meadows, with its National Trust buildings and memorials, before leaving Surrey and entering Berkshire.

== Berkshire ==
In Berkshire, the A308 forms the main road of the town of Old Windsor, where it is called Straight Road. It then goes on past the north end of Windsor Great Park, where it is called Albert Road, and through the west side of central Windsor. In Windsor, the A308 is called Osborne Road, Goslar Way and Maidenhead Road which finally re-adopts the normal third part-orientation of WNW. Finally, after sweeping round to its fourth major direction, NNW through Bray under the M4 (the original location of Junction 8), to a junction with the A308(M) which is a spur connecting to the M4. Afterwards the road is called Windsor Road and Braywick Road, and it wends through Maidenhead, passing its Victorian clock tower, the A308 continues under the names of Gringer Hill, Furze Platt Road and Marlow Road, before terminating at the A404 road in the sports-focussed civil parish of Bisham which has its riverside and Abbey ruins 200m north-west. Facing this on the river is the larger, equally well-preserved and green town of Marlow.
