= A309 road =

Road in England

Coordinates: 51.3916°N 0.3448°W

A309

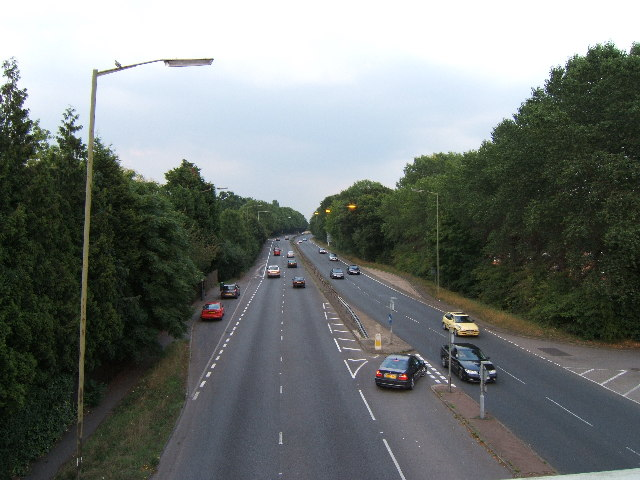
- The A309 near Hinchley Wood

Route information
- Length: 5.2 mi (8.4 km)

Major junctions
- North end: Twickenham
- A310 A313 A308 A3050 A307; A3 A243
- South end: Hook

Location
- Country: United Kingdom
- Constituent country: England
- Primary destinations: Hampton Court, Kingston upon Thames

Road network
- Roads in the United Kingdom; Motorways; A and B road zones
← A308	→ A310

The A309 is a mostly primary status A-road that runs in two sections, a short section in Twickenham and Teddington as a non-primary status A-road, as well as the much longer primary A-road section that runs from Hampton Court to Hook.

== Route ==
=== Twickenham and Teddington ===
The A309 starts in Strawberry Hill near Twickenham, west London at a roundabout with the A310. It is named Waldegrave Road before passingthe A313 at Teddington High Street. It then runs on a short stretch named Park Road. The first section of the A309 ends at the B358 north of Bushy Park, where Park Road continues towards the east and becomes Sandy Lane, and the westbound road is Queen's Road. Reaching the second part of the A309 is reached by travelling through Bushy Park (Chestnut Avenue) although since 2020 that has not been permitted by car.

=== Hampton Court to Hook ===
The second section of the A309 starts at a roundabout by Hampton Court Palace with the A308 in the Borough of Richmond upon Thames, Greater London, as a primary A-road. Heading into East Molesey, it passes the main entrance to the palace before going over Hampton Court Bridge. As it goes over the bridge, it enters the borough of Elmbridge, Surrey and becomes Hampton Court Way. It passes junctions with the A3050 and the B369 before the speed limit increases to 40 mph (64 km/h). In Thames Ditton, it passes a roundabout with the B364 (Embercourt Road), before heading near to Esher railway station.

It then enters Hinchley Wood and passes through the Scilly Isles Roundabout with the A307. The road then changes name to Kingston By-pass as a dual-carriageway. It passes near Hinchley Wood railway station just before a crossroads with Manor Road North and South. It then comes to a roundabout with Claygate Lane and the speed limit increases again to 50 mph (80 km/h). It heads through the edge of Long Ditton with a slip road heading to the A3. The A309 then continues for a short stretch before entering the Royal Borough of Kingston Upon Thames immediately before its eastern terminus at Hook Junction with the A243 and the A3.

== Notable landmarks ==
- Bushy Park
- Hampton Court Palace
- Hampton Court Bridge
- Hampton Court railway station
- Scilly Isles roundabout with the A307 road
- Hook Junction with the A243 and A3
