= Weston Green =

Village in Surrey, England

Coordinates: 51.384°N 0.351°W

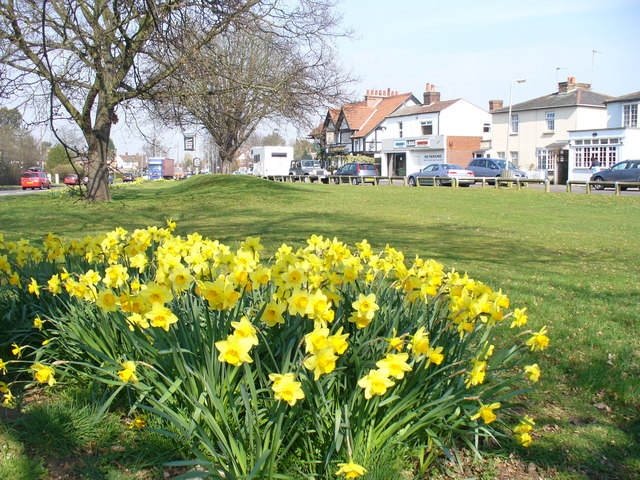
- The narrow western section of Weston Green has the main through route and the retail/dining/entertainment roads of the village. The local council offset the A309 road with daffodils in spring time.

- Location within Surrey
- Area: 1.5 km^{2} (0.58 sq mi)
- Population: 3,876 (2011 census)
  - Density: 2,584/km^{2} (6,690/sq mi)
- OS grid reference: TQ1566
- Civil parish: n/a
- District: Elmbridge
- Shire county: Surrey
- Region: South East
- Country: England
- Sovereign state: United Kingdom
- Post town: THAMES DITTON
- Postcode district: KT7
- Post town: ESHER
- Postcode district: KT10
- Dialling code: 020; 01372
- Police: Surrey
- Fire: Surrey
- Ambulance: South East Coast
- UK Parliament: Esher and Walton

Weston Green is a small suburban village (Note: An almost identical definition is the parish of Weston, which officially gives the village a status as one of the villages in England) and a ward in the Elmbridge borough of Surrey. This area was, until 1901, a part of Thames Ditton with which it remains contiguous and associated. Weston Green is also contiguous with Esher, which provides the village's closest railway station. The village forms a rough triangle of land along the west side of the midsection of the Hampton Court Branch Line next to Thames Ditton railway station and down to Esher railway station (which is on the South West Main Line), with the split between the two being the part dual-carriageway, the A309.

== History ==
=== Farm and manors ===
The name is derived from Westun, a farmstead covering land in the west of Thames Ditton.

Weston Green appears in Domesday Book of 1086 as Westone held by Barking Abbey (a nunnery). Its domesday assets were: 3 ploughs. It rendered £2 per year to its feudal system overlords.

The village occupies part of the lands of two manors of medieval Thames Ditton:

- the manor of Weston which remained with its ecclesiastical owners (as at 1086) until shortly before the Dissolution, when Henry VIII bought it to add to the honour (set of manors) of Hampton Court
- the manor of Immeworth (or Imworth), which belonged to Ralphe de Imworth in the reign of Henry III.

According to the Chancery Rolls of 1212, King John was entertained at a residence of some size in Ditton belonging to Geoffrey Fitz Pierre, the Chief Justice, during a royal journey from Chertsey to London. It was likely the house of one of these two manors.

A curious reminder of the ancient lordship of Weston is given by a notice board, which used to stand on the common, headed 'Manor of Weston otherwise Barking'. The alternative name of Barking Manor appears in surveys before the 20th century of Imber Court.

The manor of Weston was annexed by Act of Parliament in 1539 and leased in the following year to John Baker. In later times, the Crown usually demised it upon lease to the owner of Imber Court. In the great Onslow sale of Imber Court in 1778, William Speer (who had acquired property in Westminster and Fulham on marrying heiress Katherine Wilson) bought the largest parcel of land, Manor Farm. In 1801 his son William bought the remains of the manor of Weston from the Crown. This comprised waste (infertile land) that was common land and also came with the Lordship of the Manor of Weston "alias Barking". William passed on the title of Lord of the Manor of Weston to his son Wilfred Speer, and later it was inherited by Wilfred's son Wilfred Dakins Speer and then Hannibal son of Cecilia Speer and Hannibal Sandys, who took the name of Speer to conform with William's will. At about the same time that Speer bought the manor of Weston, he bought extensive 'wastes' or common lands belonging to the manors of Claygate and Imber Court, which has since been treated as part of the manor of Weston.

The barn of Weston Manor Farm, built to Henry VIII's order, was said to be a 'huge and splendid building'. During the reign of his younger daughter Elizabeth I the farm belonged to Thomas Fanshawe. It was demolished in 1962.

Towards the end of the 18th century, an amateur police force of about 80 men was formed at Weston Green. In 1792, a group of vigilantes was formed and based at the Harrow Inn. Their backers included William Speer of Weston Grange, Thomas Bracey and William Chauncey.

From 1901 until 1939 a plain, red brick, chapel of ease here existed to the church of Thames Ditton. Weston Green was the birthplace of Felicia Browne (1904–1936).

== Amenities ==
A green buffer, including the Esher and Thames Ditton Golf Course, separates Weston Green from the Littleworth Common part of Claygate that was also once a manor of Thames Ditton. East Molesey and Esher's part of the Imber Court and Sandown Park neighbourhoods directly adjoin. Its relatively small green is adjoined by the larger Old Cranleighan (Sports) Club, see Cranleigh School.

Weston Green has an Anglican church, All Saints, built in 1939 having been designed by Edward Maufe who designed Guildford Cathedral. and an unusually rounded Catholic church. Hampton Court Way was built 1928–32. It bisects the village and became the division between the Esher and Thames Ditton post towns.

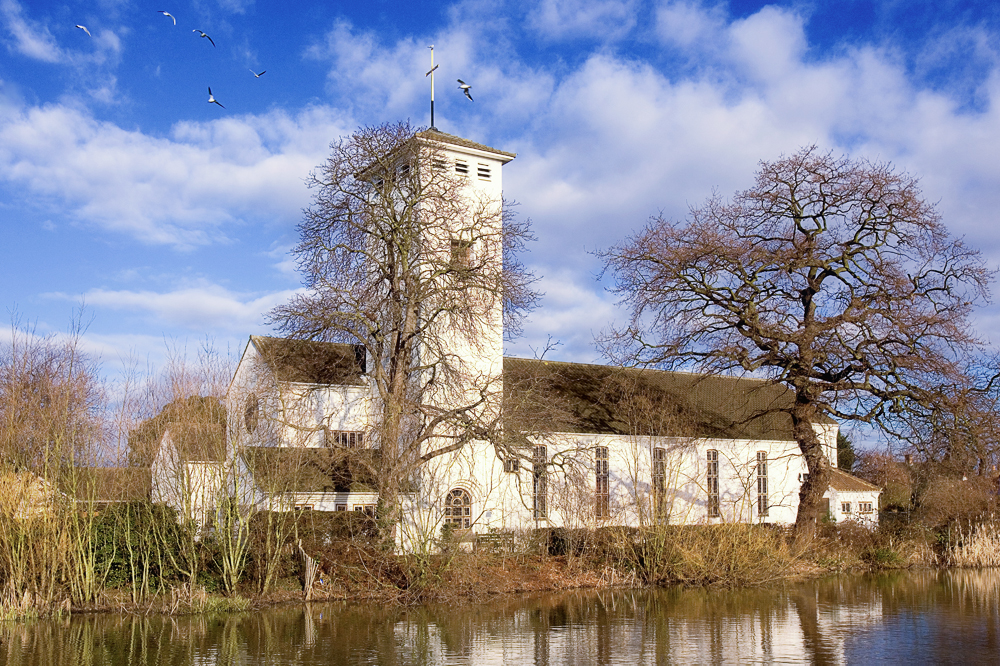
All Saints – Edward Maufe's brick built church showing features and proportions typical of his designs and part of Marney's Pond

== Demography and housing ==
2011 Census Homes
Output area	Detached	Semi-detached	Terraced	Flats and apartments	Caravans/temporary/mobile homes	Shared between households
(ward)	804	398	30	134	1	0

The average level of accommodation in the region composed of detached houses was 28%, the average that was apartments was 22.6%.

2011 Census Key Statistics
Output area	Population	Households	% Owned outright	% Owned with a loan	hectares
(ward)	3,876	1,367	40	48	150

The proportion of households in the settlement who owned their home outright compares to the regional average of 35.1%. The proportion who owned their home with a loan compares to the regional average of 32.5%. The remaining % is made up of rented dwellings (plus a negligible % of households living rent-free).

== Local government ==
At Surrey County Council, one of the 81 representatives represents the area, that for The Dittons division. At the two tiers levels of local government, to date representatives have been from the Conservative more often lately a usually allied to the others Thames Ditton & Weston Green Residents' Association but sometimes acting independently from the other residents associations, as currently professed at the county level by Nick Darby.

At Elmbridge Borough Council the ward is a smaller one than its average and elects two councillors.

Elmbridge Borough Councillor
Election	Member	Ward
2016	Tannia Shipley	Weston Green
2016	Jane Turner	Weston Green
2016	Nigel Haig-Brown	Weston Green

Surrey County Councillor
Election	Member	Electoral Division
2017	Nick Darby	The Dittons

== Notes and references ==
Notes
