= Hook, London =

Area in Kingston upon Thames, London

Coordinates: 51.3635°N 0.2998°W

Hook
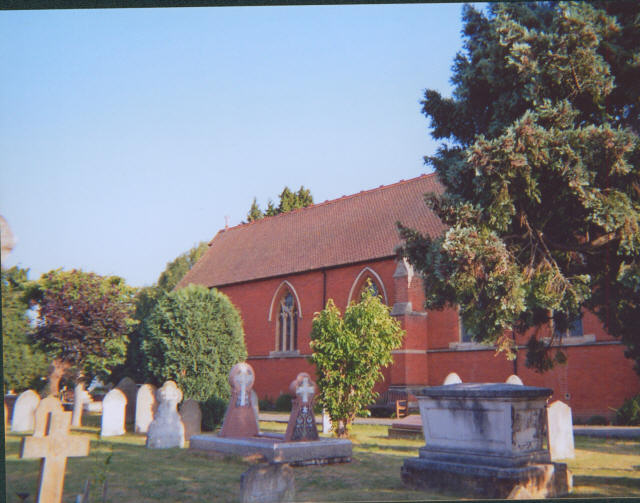
- St Paul's Church

- Location within Greater London
- Population: 18,973 (Chessington North and Hook and Chessington South wards 2011)
- OS grid reference: TQ183641
- London borough: Kingston
- Ceremonial county: Greater London
- Region: London
- Country: England
- Sovereign state: United Kingdom
- Post town: CHESSINGTON
- Postcode district: KT9
- Dialling code: 020
- Police: Metropolitan
- Fire: London
- Ambulance: London
- UK Parliament: Kingston and Surbiton
- London Assembly: South West

Hook is a suburban area in south west London, England. It forms part of the Royal Borough of Kingston upon Thames and is located 12 miles (19.3 km) south west of Charing Cross. Neighbouring settlements include Hinchley Wood, Long Ditton, Surbiton, Tolworth and Chessington.

An RAF barrage balloon depot opened in Hook c. 1938 and was later known as RAF Chessington, latterly used as a hospital until demolished and redeveloped for housing in the 1990s.

Hook forms part of the Chessington post town.

== Governance ==
Hook was a civil parish which formed part of the Surbiton Urban District of Surrey from 1895. The urban district became a municipal borough in 1936 and on 1 April 1965 its former area was transferred to Greater London. Hook parish which was also abolished on 1 April 1965 and the former area of the parish together with that of the Chessington parish, forms a protrusion of Greater London with the Surrey districts of Elmbridge to the west, Mole Valley to the south and Epsom and Ewell to the east. At the 1951 census (one of the last before the abolition of the parish), Hook had a population of 5657.

== Transport ==
Hook is on the A243 road. Chessington North railway station is within walking distance to the east. Hook furthermore only has one bus stop: Hook Parade, which is used by lines 71, 465, 467, 671 and K4.

== Surviving old buildings ==
Only three listed buildings exist in the entire post town of Chessington, two of which are on Hook Road, just north of Chessington itself, on the east side. The first is at number 325: a 19th-century CE two-storey home featuring a central doorway with moulded architrave and bracketed hood with fluted Ionic columns. The second, at number 435, is a two-storey house inscribed 1669 but with later alterations. It has a two-part baffle- (or lobby-) entry, and has been refaced with brick but is probably timber-framed behind; its sides and back are weather-boarded and it has a steeply pitched, pantiled roof with central chimney. Many former 18th- and 19th-century houses on this old Kingston-upon-Thames to Dorking and Horsham route have been redeveloped or were destroyed during World War II, including The Blitz, as shown in the street numbering.

== Notable people ==
Harry Hawker, record-breaking Brooklands-based test pilot and racing driver lived in Hook Road until his death in a flying accident at Hendon Aerodrome and is buried in St Paul's churchyard.
