= A243 road =

Road in England

A243

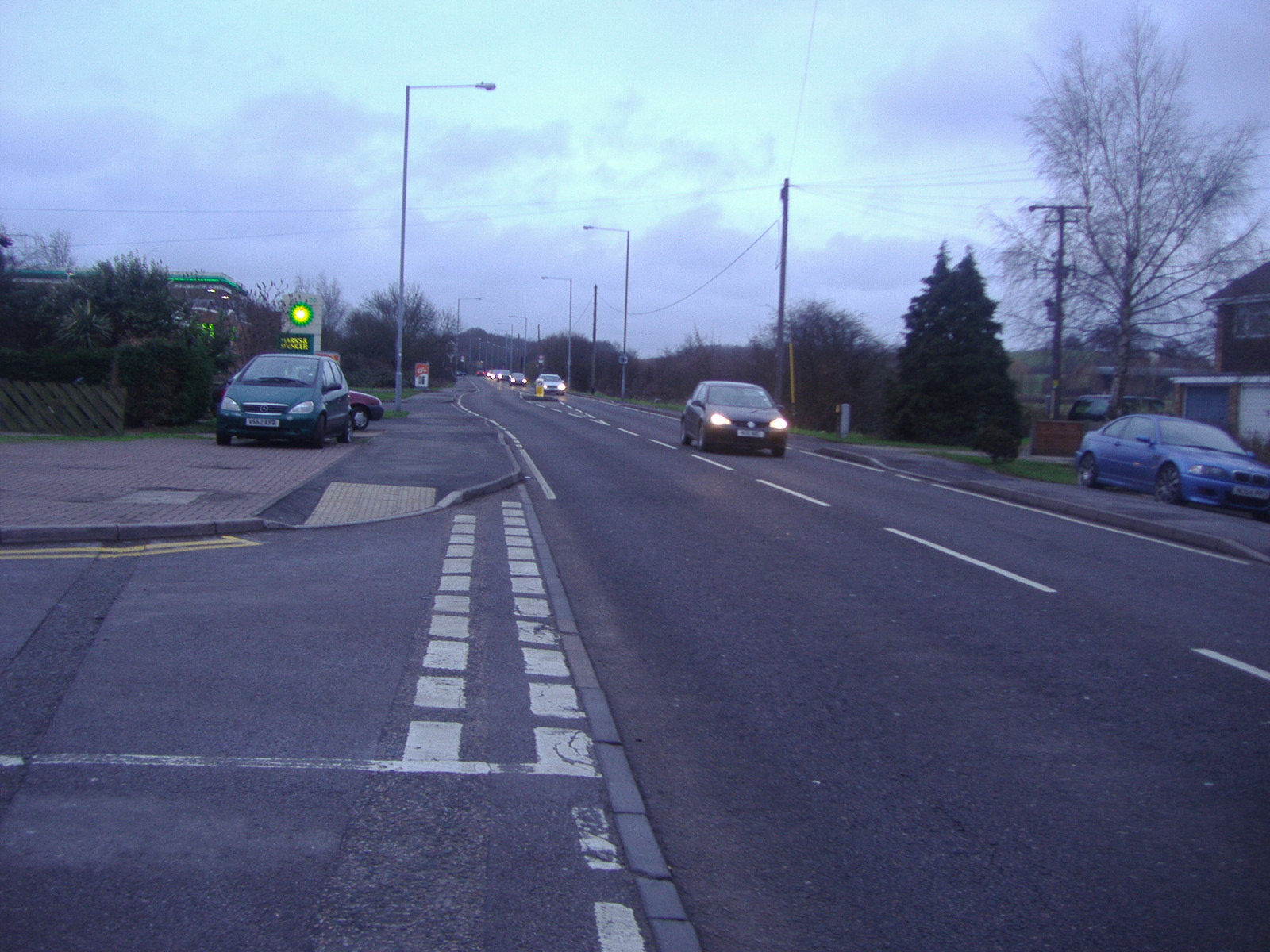
- A243 southbound at Malden Rushett

Route information
- Length: 7.4 mi (11.9 km)

Major junctions
- North end: Surbiton
- A24 M25 A245 A244; A3 A3210 A307
- South end: Leatherhead, Surrey

Location
- Country: United Kingdom
- Constituent country: England

Road network
- Roads in the United Kingdom; Motorways; A and B road zones
| ← A242 | → A244 |

The A243 road in England is a partially primary status A-road that runs from Leatherhead in Surrey to Surbiton in the Royal Borough of Kingston Upon Thames, Greater London. It is primary for most of its length, from Leatherhead to Hook Junction with the A3 before running as a non-primary A-road through Surbiton to its terminus at the A307. Although comparatively short it is a busy road connecting a number of other A roads with the M25 motorway.

== Route ==
=== Leatherhead ===
The A243 starts at the Knoll roundabout in Leatherhead with the A24, and the B2122 (to the town centre). It then runs for about half a mile before coming to a large roundabout, that is half of Junction 9 of the M25 motorway (to join its clockwise side). This is the start of the A245 road. It goes straight on at the roundabout and after a mile this reaches another roundabout, the other half of Junction 9 (to join the M25 anti-clockwise.) Straight on is the start of the A244 road, here the A243 goes off to the right heading north, with Ashtead Common on its right, and Leatherhead Golf Course on its left.

=== Malden Rushett, Chessington and Hook ===
The road enters the Royal Borough of Kingston Upon Thames, Greater London entering the hamlet of Malden Rushett crossing the B280 road, named Fairoak Lane on the left, and Rushett Lane on the right. The A243 continues and passes the Chessington World of Adventures theme park on the left. The area gradually gets more built up, and it passes Garrison Lane, which goes to Chessington South railway station. The road goes into the centre of Chessington and comes to a roundabout with two minor roads, one of which Bridge road, a link road to Chessington North railway station and Epsom. It then goes through Hook, and it passes Hook Parade, which has a few shops on it. It is briefly a dual carriageway approaching the Hook junction with the A3 and the south-east terminus of the A309.

=== Surbiton ===
Now it becomes a non primary A-road and heads towards Surbiton. There are two link roads to the A240: the B364 at the crossroads with Ditton Road where the A243 changes name to Upper Brighton Road; and at a roundabout with the A3210. It then runs for half a mile before going under the railway line near Surbiton railway station as it becomes Brighton Road. After another half-mile, it terminates at a set of traffic lights with the A307 in Seething Wells, part of the KT6 Surbiton postcode.
