= A219 road =

Road in London, England

A219

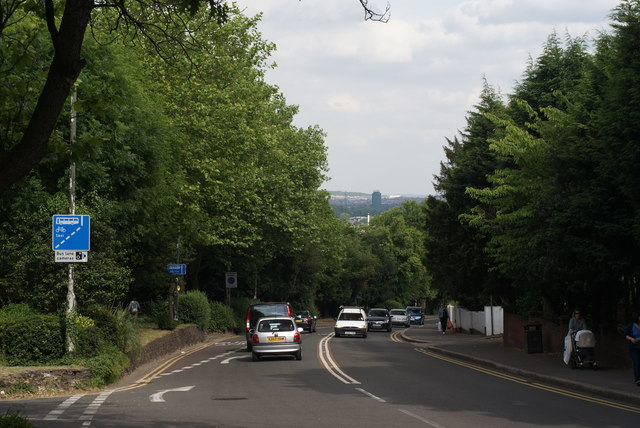
- The A219 road at Wimbledon, London

Major junctions
- North end: Harlesden; 51.5322°N 0.2373°W
- A23; A24; A25 A205 A238; A3 A304 A306 A308 A315 A3209 A3218; A4; A40 A402 A404 A4020
- South end: South Wimbledon; 51.4128°N 0.1927°W

Location
- Country: United Kingdom

Road network
- Roads in the United Kingdom; Motorways; A and B road zones

The A219, is a road in West London, England, which connects the A404 Harrow Road in Harlesden to the A24 in South Wimbledon. Running from North to South, it starts near Willesden Junction station, crosses the Grand Union Canal and runs through Shepherd's Bush, Hammersmith and Fulham, crossing the River Thames at Putney Bridge. It continues through Putney and passes Wimbledon Common, and goes through Wimbledon to terminate just after South Wimbledon Underground station at the A24.
