= Hinchley Wood railway station =

Railway station in Surrey, England

Hinchley Wood
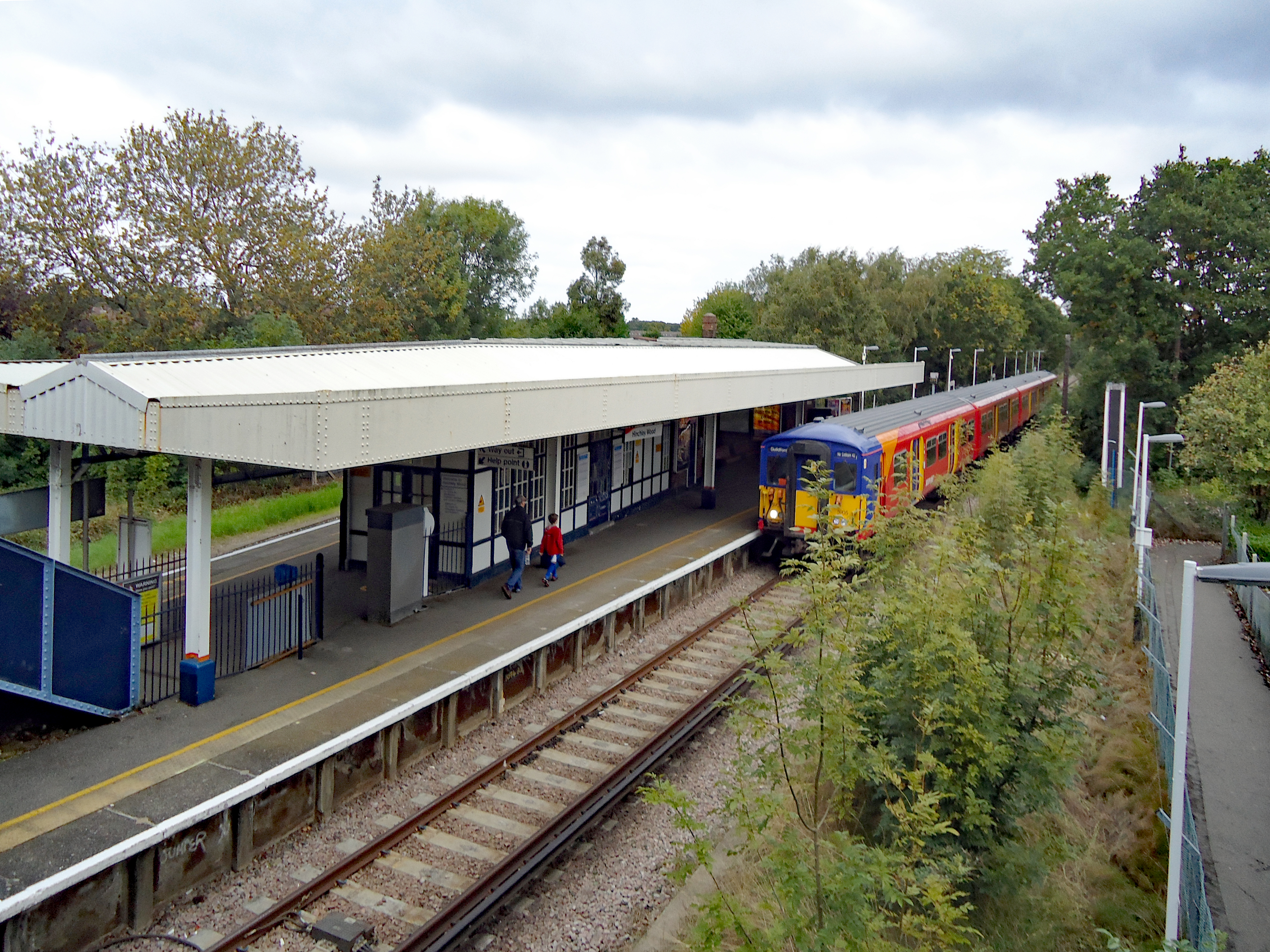

General information
- Location: Hinchley Wood, Elmbridge; England
- Coordinates: 51°22′34″N 0°20′31″W
- Grid reference: TQ155652
- Managed by: South Western Railway
- Platforms: 2

Other information
- Station code: HYW
- Classification: DfT category E

History
- Opened: 20 October 1930

Passengers
- 2020/21: ▼48,360
- 2021/22: ▲0.161 million
- 2022/23: ▲0.217 million
- 2023/24: ▲0.254 million
- 2024/25: ▲0.283 million
Location
Notes
- Passenger statistics from the Office of Rail and Road

Hinchley Wood railway station is in the centre of the compact suburban village of Hinchley Wood in Surrey, England. It is 14 miles 4 chains (22.6 km) down the line from London Waterloo and opened in 1930 after the New Guildford Line first passed through the area in 1885.

It is the northernmost station on the line, following which the line merges into the four-track South West Main Line and is outside of the Transport for London area.

== Design and amenities ==
The station has a hardstanding island layout linked by footbridges from each side of the line. Its layout and simplicity contrasts with older stations further down the line such as Claygate, the next station. The centre platform tapers as tracks curve more to the north after the station, the London-bound track is on a flyunder west of Surbiton station enabling grade segregation — fast trains on the main line's middle, fast tracks are not affected by trains entering the slow track from this line.

A modern ticket machine, Help Point and waiting room (open when the station is staffed) exist. The station is staffed from Monday to Friday between 06:30 and 11:00 and covered by Closed Circuit Television (CCTV) at all times. Electronic displays provide updates as to scheduled trains. The station is immediately outside of the area covered by the London Travel Card Zones (and Oyster readers). Buses running on the north–south minor road east of the station are in the London transport schemes, principally the K3 service.

== History ==
The station was first opened on 20 October 1930 by the intersection of the Kingston Bypass. At the time the Bypass was the A3 London-Portsmouth Road. The site is approximately half a mile south of Hampton Court (Branch Line and New Guildford Line) Junction where these opposing lines join the South West Main Line. The line was opened on 2 February 1885. Electric service applied from the outset as it was withdrawn during World War I, to be reinstituted along the route from 12 July 1925, before this station opened.

Since built, operators have been successively:

1. Southern Railway (SR)
2. British Railways (BR)
3. Network Rail with services franchised to South West Trains.

== Services ==
Services at Hinchley Wood are operated by South Western Railway using Class 450 and Class 701 EMUs.

The typical off-peak service in trains per hour is:

- 2 tph to London Waterloo via Wimbledon
- 2 tph to Guildford

On Sundays, the service is reduced to hourly in each direction.

Preceding station	National Rail	Following station
Surbiton	South Western Railway New Guildford Line	Claygate
