= Hinchley Wood =

Suburb of Elmbridge, Surrey, England

Coordinates: 51.377°N 0.336°W

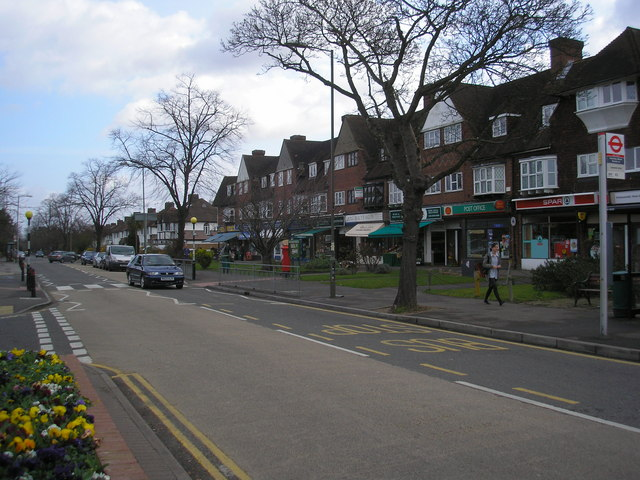
- The local shops

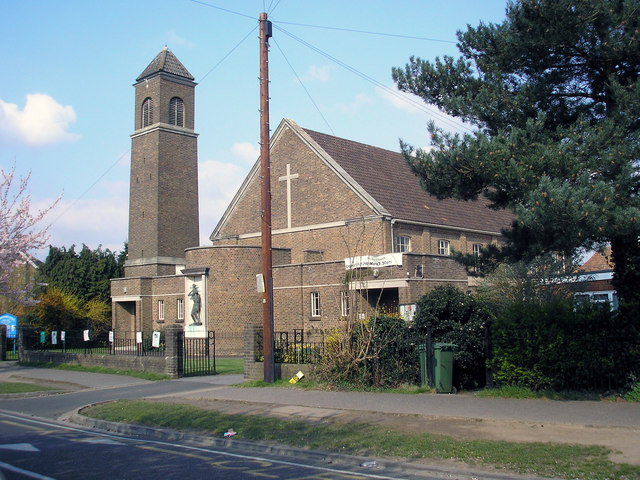
- St Christopher's, a 20th century church, is in the suburb

- Location within Surrey
- Area: 3.2 km^{2} (1.2 sq mi)
- Population: 5,068 (2011 census)
  - Density: 1,584/km^{2} (4,100/sq mi)
- OS grid reference: TQ156652
- Civil parish: n/a
- District: Elmbridge
- Shire county: Surrey
- Region: South East
- Country: England
- Sovereign state: United Kingdom
- Post town: Esher
- Postcode district: KT10
- Dialling code: 020
- Police: Surrey
- Fire: Surrey
- Ambulance: South East Coast
- UK Parliament: Esher and Walton

Hinchley Wood is a suburban district in the Elmbridge borough of Surrey, England, approximately 13 miles (21 km) south-west of Charing Cross in central London, and within the Greater London Urban Area. It developed largely around its railway station at its heart on the New Guildford Line — and many of its homes house at least one commuter to Central London. The suburb has one main parade of convenience shops, local services and a petrol station; throughout the area is a light smattering of small businesses.

A double-width section of the A309 (the Kingston Bypass) bisects the suburb which acts as a local spur road to a semi-urban section of the motorway-standard A3 road. The suburb's main retail area is directly north of a traffic light intersection adjoined by a large set of retirement flats. The suburb has no high-rise buildings and gained its first place of worship (St Christopher's Church) in 1953. Hinchley Wood has the London dialling code 020.

== History ==
The only old listed building is the 16th century Old Farm House in the town. Its listing states '... C16 with C18 addition to front left, C19 addition to right. Timber framed core, stuccoed over with plain tiled roofs. Large brick stack to rear and ends. 2 storeys with 2 tripartite wood casements to centre of first floor...' and is now on an ordinary street.

Initially the farmland on which Hinchley Wood was to be built was part of Thames Ditton. In 1925 Esher Council considered a petition from the small number of residents of Manor Road, in which ribbon development from Thames Ditton was taking place, for the provision of a new station between Surbiton and Claygate on the railway that had opened in 1885. The Southern Railway was not interested in a new station; the low population would create negligible new custom; the opening of the Kingston Bypass changed the commercial viability of new station.

Immediately the speculative possibilities created by the bypass were considered. Furthermore, even as it was being built a sewer was laid under it, at Manor Road, to facilitate development. The opening of Hinchley Wood railway station brought about the rapid emergence of Hinchley Wood as a coherent, identifiable settlement, with a housing stock so plainly superior to that typical of the 1930s.

At its annual general meeting in 1927, the chairman called attention to "great increment in the value of the land, which goes into the pockets of vigilant people at our expense". G.T. Crouch agreed to contribute £2,500 towards the cost (about one-third) of the building of the station. Having been given planning permission to build Hinchley Wood in September 1929, Crouch struck a deal with the Southern Railway for the construction of the station. To persuade the Southern Railway to build it, Crouch had to help pay for it. Although the Southern Railway knew that a new settlement would bring new business, it also knew the benefit to Crouch.

After the Second World War, the Inland Revenue had large offices housed in the single storey inter-connected barrack blocks of former Italian Prisoner of War camp on the north side of the railway station. These blocks were eventually demolished to become a very dense turn of the Millennium housing development.

In 1953, the community's church in the Church of England, St. Christopher's Church was built.

In 1999 residents took on McDonald's to defeat a plan to take over and convert a public house. The pub had been visited two years before by the Soviet leader from 1985 to 1991 Mikhail Gorbachev and his wife when their flight home to Russia was delayed.

== Transportation and growth ==
Hinchley Wood railway station was built at the point where conveniently the tracks forked already, making it the more economically built and staffed. Additionally, the regionally monopolised owner-operator, Southern Railway bought some more land on which to build a goods yard, which in the event was never built because competition from road haulage became too great, but the land was retained; ultimately this allowed a car park to be provided.

When the station opened, Hinchley Wood comprised a couple of dozen houses and a petrol filling station (Esher Filling Station, colloquially referred to as "EFS") in a field that bordered the bypass. Development took place around the shops that were built next to the station.

The speed at which the houses in Hinchley Wood were built was phenomenal, with the peak years being in 1933–34 when 750 residents moved in, many of whom were London commuters. The Hinchley Wood Residents' Association was formed in 1931 and quickly became an effective voice for the community on Esher Council.

Hinchley Wood is served by the K3 bus route through Claygate to Esher to the south and through Surbiton to Kingston and Roehampton to the north.

The local authority has varied from Conservative to Residents Association since its 1974 formation.

== Countryside and recreation parks ==
Many residents visit Littleworth Common, where it meets Esher Eagles Rugby League club, a community rugby club. These are followed by, in the south west, a historic but now small woodland named Hinchley Wood. Telegraph Hill is also southwest of Hinchley Wood and is the largest nearby walking spot and has some visitor attraction for its Grade II (architecture) listed 'Semaphore House' semaphore tower described as "c1822. Rendered brick on projecting plinth with hipped slate roof. 3-storey square tower to centre...C20 glazing bar sash windows throughout".

== Education ==
Hinchley Wood has two schools, Hinchley Wood Primary School and Hinchley Wood School, one of the main secondary schools in the area, that includes a sixth form.

== Demography and housing ==
2011 Census Homes
Output area	Detached	Semi-detached	Terraced	Flats and apartments	Caravans/temporary/mobile homes	Shared between households
(ward)	1,089	342	109	312	7	0

The average level of accommodation in the region composed of detached houses was 28%, the average that was apartments was 22.6%.

Output area	Population	Households	% Owned outright	% Owned with a loan	hectares
(ward)	5,068	1,859	40	45	320

The proportion of households in the settlement who owned their home outright compares to the regional average of 35.1%. The proportion who owned their home with a loan compares to the regional average of 32.5%. The remaining % is made up of rented dwellings (plus a negligible % of households living rent-free).

== In the media ==
=== McDonald's rebuffed ===
Hinchley Wood has independent cafés and small supermarkets. Nonetheless in 1999 McDonald's sought to widen its reach, by opening a rare pure suburbia outlet. Hinchley Wood residents, organised as Residents Against McDonald's (RAM), took on McDonald's to defeat a plan to turn their local pub into a drive-through fast-food outlet. The residents defeated McDonald's on 16 June 2000 after a 552-day continuous occupation. The pub has since been demolished and has been replaced by retirement flats.
