= Borough of Elmbridge =

Local government district in Surrey, England

Coordinates: 51.3700°N 0.3618°W

- Borough and non-metropolitan district
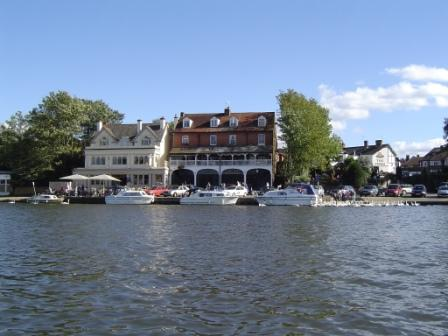
- Walton-on-Thames, one of the borough's main towns

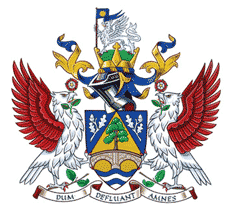
- Coat of arms
- Motto: Dum Defluant Amnes (Latin: Until the rivers cease to flow)
- Elmbridge shown within Surrey
- Sovereign state: United Kingdom
- Constituent country: England
- Region: South East England
- Non-metropolitan county: Surrey
- Status: Non-metropolitan district
- Admin HQ: Esher
- Incorporated: 1 April 1974

Government
  - Type: Non-metropolitan district council
  - Body: Elmbridge Borough Council

Area
  - Total: 37.2 sq mi (96.3 km^{2})
  - Rank: 203rd (of 296)

Population (2025)
  - Total: 142,484
  - Rank: 168th (of 296)
  - Density: 3,830/sq mi (1,480/km^{2})

Ethnicity (2021)
  - Ethnic groups: List: 86.1% White; 6.5% Asian; 4.1% Mixed; 2% other; 1.2% Black

Religion (2021)
  - Religion: List: 52% Christianity; 35.4% no religion; 6.4% not stated; 2.5% Islam; 1.6% Hinduism; 0.5% Buddhism; 0.5% Judaism; 0.5% Sikhism; 0.4% other
- Time zone: UTC0 (GMT)
  - Summer (DST): UTC+1 (BST)
- ONS code: 43UB (ONS); E07000207 (GSS)
- OS grid reference: TQ1402064766
- Police: Surrey

Elmbridge is a local government district with borough status in Surrey, England. Its council is based in Esher, and other notable towns and villages include Cobham, Walton-on-Thames, Weybridge and Molesey. The borough lies just outside the administrative boundary of Greater London, but is almost entirely within the M25 motorway which encircles London. Settlements within Elmbridge range from the contiguous suburbs of the Greater London Built-up Area in the borough's northeast (Molesey, Thames Ditton, Long Ditton, Weston Green, and Hinchley Wood) to the commuter towns and villages of the Metropolitan Green Belt beyond, including Walton on Thames, Hersham, Weybridge, Esher, Claygate, Cobham, and Oxshott.

The neighbouring districts are Mole Valley, Guildford, Woking, Runnymede, Spelthorne, Richmond upon Thames and Kingston upon Thames, the latter two being London boroughs.

== History ==
The district was created on 1 April 1974 under the Local Government Act 1972, covering two former districts which were both abolished at the same time:

- Esher Urban District
- Walton and Weybridge Urban District

The new district was named after the medieval Elmbridge hundred which had covered a similar area. The hundred appears in Domesday Book of 1086 as Amelebrige. The name thus derives from the River Amele or Emley, an old name for the River Mole, rather than elm trees. The district was awarded borough status from its creation, allowing the chair of the council to take the title of mayor.

In the early 1990s the neighbouring London Borough of Kingston upon Thames sought to have eastern parts of Elmbridge, including Long Ditton, Thames Ditton, Hinchley Wood, Weston Green and Molesey transferred to it, making the case that these areas had particularly strong social and economic ties to Kingston and Greater London. The proposal was considered by the Local Government Boundary Commission in 1992, but was not pursued.

As part of upcoming structural changes to local government in England, the district of Elmbridge will be abolished in April 2027 and the area will become part of the new unitary authority of East Surrey.

== Governance ==
- See main article: Elmbridge Borough Council

== Geography ==
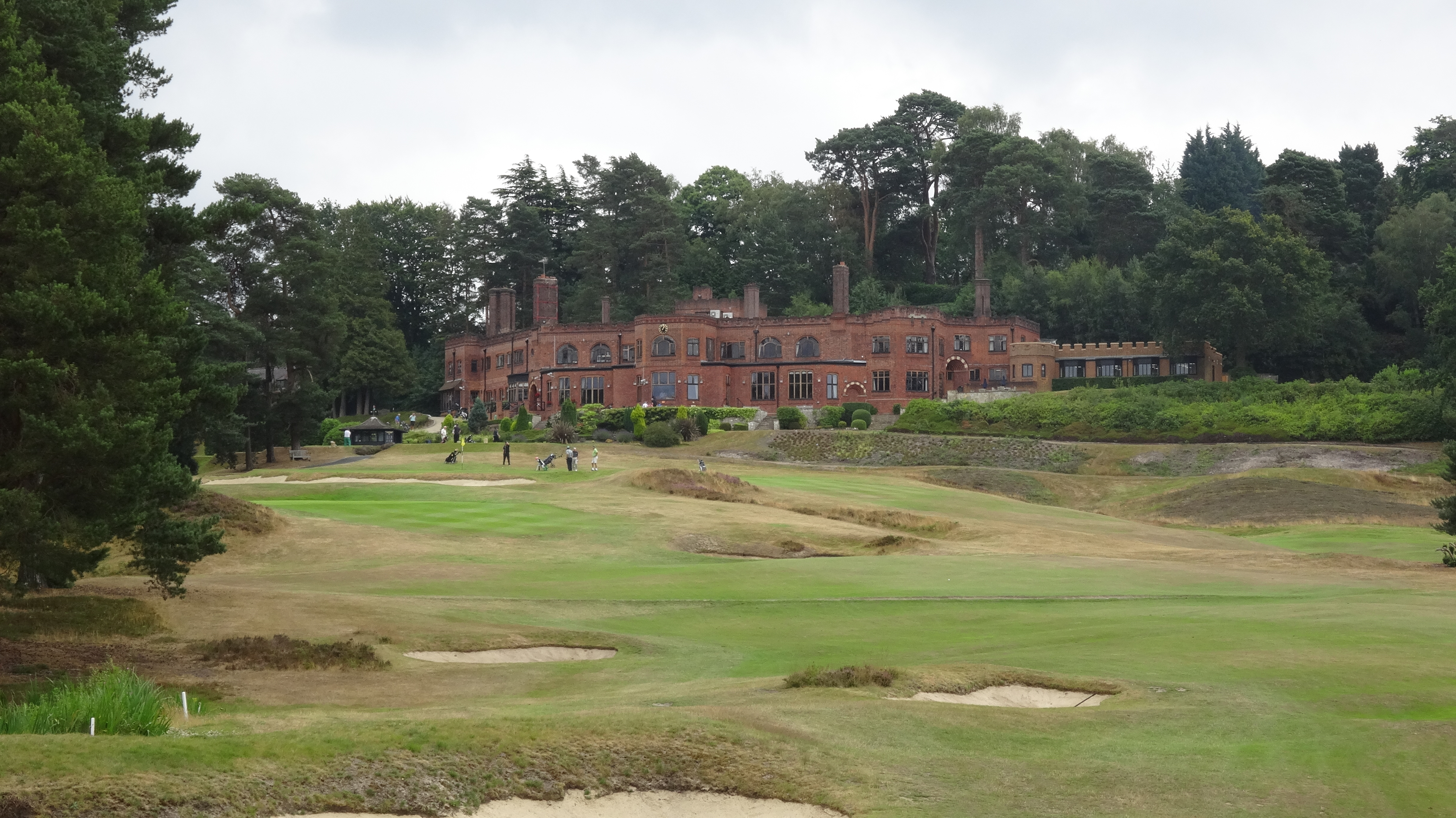
St George's Hill Golf Club in Weybridge

In common with the nearby Surrey boroughs of Spelthorne and Epsom and Ewell, much of Elmbridge is a continuation of the built-up area of suburban London, and the areas of Molesey, Long Ditton, Thames Ditton, Hinchley Wood and Esher, lie within the social and commercial orbit of neighbouring Kingston upon Thames. Molesey, Cobham, the Dittons and Claygate were included in the Metropolitan Police District from 1840 until 2000.

=== Elevations, landscape and wildlife ===
The northern third of the borough is flatter and fertile with free draining slightly acid loamy soil, similar to the south, as described in the Surrey article. In the next third, the first of the remarkable acid soil heaths in west Surrey begin to appear in places here (Note: See also Bagshot Formation, Chobham Common and Surrey Heath), characterised by undulating heaths: these sandy and stony reliefs start in the east in the Esher Commons, covering the central swathe of the area including Oxshott Heath and Woods and areas of Weybridge and areas surrounding Wisley, a natural soil for pines, other evergreen trees as well as heather and gorse, described as naturally wet, very acid sandy and loamy soil which is just 1.9% of English soil and 0.2% of Welsh soil. Claremont Landscape Garden and Fan Court (now independent school) is on part of this elevated soil as is St George's Hill. Most undeveloped land in Elmbridge is Metropolitan Green Belt.

The central band of forest/heath includes part of the Wisley and Ockham Commons reserve within the national wildlife trust scheme: see Surrey Wildlife Trust, several pine heath based golf courses and in the north there are reservoirs, on the side of which there is sheep grazing.

=== Watercourses ===
The Mole, passing the Grade I Church in Stoke D'Abernon, Cobham Mill at Grade II and Painshill Park and the Wey, passing Silvermere Golf Course and the Brooklands circuit, hotel and retail park, cut through the borough from south to north reaching the River Thames which denotes the northern border, stretching from Weybridge to Thames Ditton apart from inclusion of inhabited islands such as Wheatley's Ait (Note: Also in the borough other than the riverside properties on Wheatley's Ait are the largely undeveloped islands of Desborough, D'Oyly Carte and Sunbury Lock Ait in the River Thames). The Wey and Mole have sources beyond gentle valleys which cut through the high North Downs to the south.

== Settlements within the Borough ==
From East to West:

- Long Ditton
- Thames Ditton
- Hinchley Wood
- Claygate
- Weston Green
- Molesey (East Molesey)
- Esher including West End and Lower Green
- Oxshott
- Hersham including Burwood Park (Note: Also including Whiteley Village)
- Molesey (West Molesey)
- Walton on Thames including Fieldcommon and Ashley Park
- Cobham including Fairmile and the hamlets of Hatchford and Downside
- Stoke D'Abernon
- Weybridge including St George's Hill

== Affluence and The "Grandees" ==
The borough is home to some of the county's highest earners. It has been labelled Britain's Beverly Hills by sections of the press. Famous residents, past and present, include Maurice Gibb Sir Cliff Richard, Mick Jagger, George Harrison, John Lennon, Ringo Starr, Ronnie Wood, Andy Murray, Kate Winslet, John Terry, Gary Lineker, Mick Hucknall, Frank Lampard, Didier Drogba, Theo Paphitis, Chris Tarrant, Peter Crouch, Michael Aspel and Shilpa Shetty.

St George's Hill is noted as the site of one of the earliest experiments in common ownership of land by ordinary people, in a marked contrast to the area's modern status as a wealthy private estate. In 1649 the "Diggers", one of the radical groups set up in the aftermath of the English Civil War and the execution of Charles I seized common land in the area and lived by simple farming. As well as debates about religion and how the country should be run at this time these groups complained that even the Parliamentary side in the Civil War was dominated by "Grandees" i.e. wealthy nobles who often spent their time in comfort conducting fatuous debates in Parliament while the less well off risked their lives in the war to defeat an absolutist system. They were the subject of a long campaign of harassment by a local landowner and were eventually removed following a court case.

== Transport ==
The South West Main Line serves the borough, with four stations from Esher to Weybridge, one of which several express services call at: Walton on Thames (specifically between Ashley Park and Burwood Park neighbourhoods). The branch lines have services with four stations in the borough via Cobham & Stoke D'Abernon to Guildford; and a branch to Thames Ditton and Hampton Court railway station in East Molesey, both within Transport for London's Zone 6.

The A3(M) three junctions here (from London) which bisects the south of Elmbridge and the M25 motorway has two junctions west of Elmbridge.

The main north-south road is the A244 for instance to London Heathrow Airport and starts in the borough at Walton Bridge leading to Esher and Oxshott then to Leatherhead. The east-west Leatherhead to Horsell, Woking road, the A245 leads by Cobham and Brooklands, Weybridge.

Bus services include TfL Oyster card services to East and West Molesey, Hinchley Wood, Claygate and Esher.

Cycling is very popular outside of commuting, with the Thames Path passing through the north of the borough and the 2012 Summer Olympics hosting both of the main road cycling events in the borough with most of the road section around Hampton Court and with the sections of the routes taken to and from Box Hill.

== Economy ==
The economy is diverse, with a strong local service sector, including numerous bars and restaurants, homes built and being built for city workers as the majority of locations have access to one of the Home Counties fastest commutes, trades including interior supplies, fitting, gardening, golf course/landscape management and a developed public/education sector. Of international renown are the employers Sony, Procter & Gamble, JTI (formerly Gallaher) and Toshiba Information Systems alongside the local corporate venues and day-out attractions of Sandown Park Racecourse and Mercedes-Benz World. As of 2012, Elmbridge residents had average weekly earnings of £1162.

== Twinning ==
The Borough of Elmbridge is not twinned with any towns. However, between 1966 and 2009 Elmbridge was formally twinned with the Paris suburb of Rueil-Malmaison, Hauts de Seine, France.

== Coat of arms ==
The council's arms were created upon the formation of the present day district, being formed out of symbols taken from the local towns and villages with the Latin motto meaning until the rivers cease. The arms include a depiction of an elm tree on a bridge, being a play on the district's name.
