= A3 road =

London to Portsmouth road in England

A3
- A3 A397 (former A3)

Route information
- Length: 72 mi (116 km)

Major junctions
- North-east end: City of London; 51.5108°N 0.0866°W
- A2; A23; A24 A205 M25; A31 A3(M); A27 M27 M275
- South-west end: Portsmouth Harbour; 50.7918°N 1.1086°W

Location
- Country: United Kingdom
- Primary destinations: Kingston upon Thames; Guildford; Petersfield

Road network
- Roads in the United Kingdom; Motorways; A and B road zones
← A2	→ A4

The A3, known as the Portsmouth Road or London Road in sections, is a major road connecting the City of London and Portsmouth passing close to Kingston upon Thames, Guildford, Haslemere and Petersfield. For much of its 67-mile (108 km) length, it is classified as a trunk road and therefore managed by National Highways. Almost all of the road has been built to dual carriageway standards or wider. Apart from bypass sections in London, the road travels in a southwest direction and, after Liss, south-southwest.

Close to its southerly end, motorway traffic is routed via the A3(M), then either the east–west A27 or the Portsmouth-only M275 which has multiple lanes leading off the westbound A27 — for non-motorway traffic, the A3 continues into Portsmouth alongside the A3(M), mostly as a single carriageway in each direction through Waterlooville and adjoining small towns. The other section of single carriageways is through the urban environs of Battersea, Clapham and Stockwell towards the northern end, which has to accommodate bus lanes and parking meter bays.

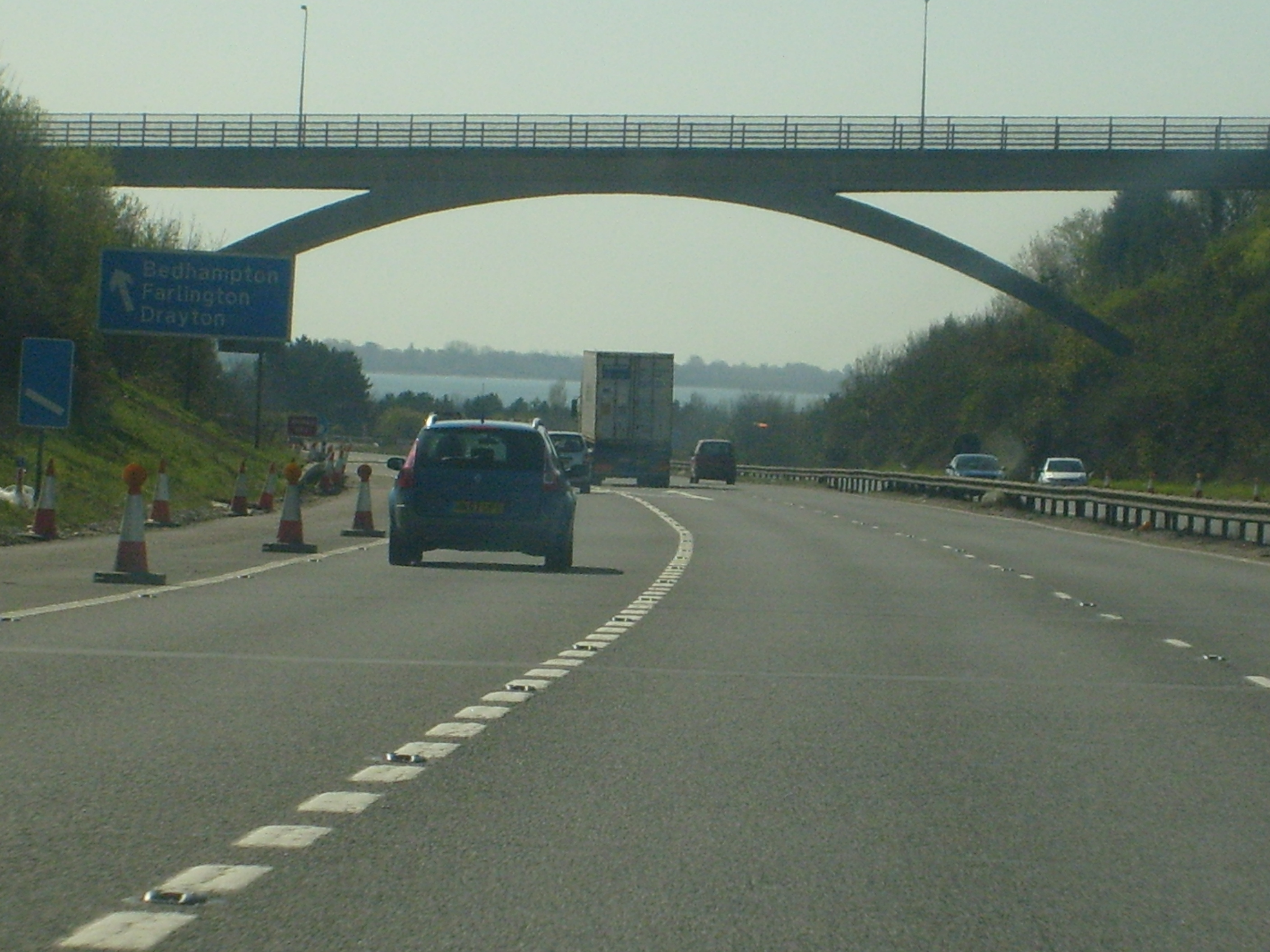
The A3(M) at the Portsdown Hill Road Bridge nearing Junction 5 with the A27

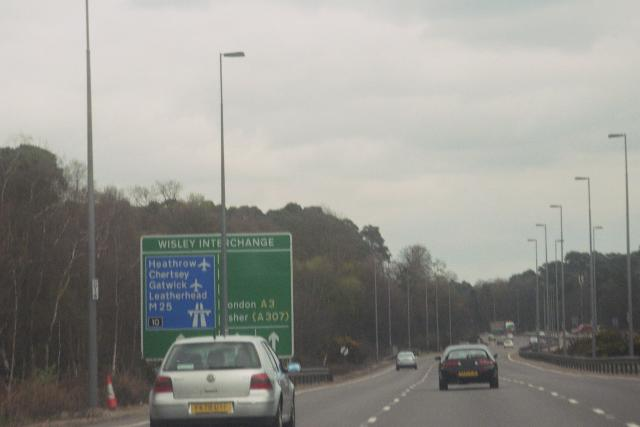
Northbound near the Wisley Interchange with the M25

== History ==
By the 17th century, the historic Portsmouth Road bore great strategic significance as the road link between the capital city and what became the settled main port of the Royal Navy. In 1603, a petition was passed by The Queen for the expansion of the bench of justices of the town of Guildford along its route, in consideration of the importance of the Portsmouth Road. Many of the other towns and villages that the road passed through gained income and, in the case of towns, a market advantage as a result — principally in the history of Kingston upon Thames, Godalming and Petersfield.

The road was once the haunt of highwaymen such as Jerry Abershawe (executed in 1795), who in the 18th Century terrorised the area around Kingston and led a gang based at the Bald Faced Stag Inn on the Portsmouth Road. In 1749, the Hawkhurst Gang committed a murder at Rake, near Liphook. Another particularly dangerous location was in the vicinity of the wooded crest skirting the Devil's Punch Bowl, Hindhead, about 8 miles (13 km) south-west of Guildford where, in 1786 a sailor was murdered; the three perpetrators were hanged in chains nearby in 1787.

While parishes had historically been responsible for the upkeep of roads, with increasing traffic the financial burden became too much, so turnpike trusts were set up to enable tolls to be levied on travellers, which was often unpopular. Road traffic was to some extent alleviated by the coming of the railways in the 19th century, but the Portsmouth Road always remained a major route. By the 1870s, responsibility for roads had passed to county councils, with the Portsmouth Road outside London falling mainly under Surrey and Hampshire county councils, with a short distance in West Sussex.

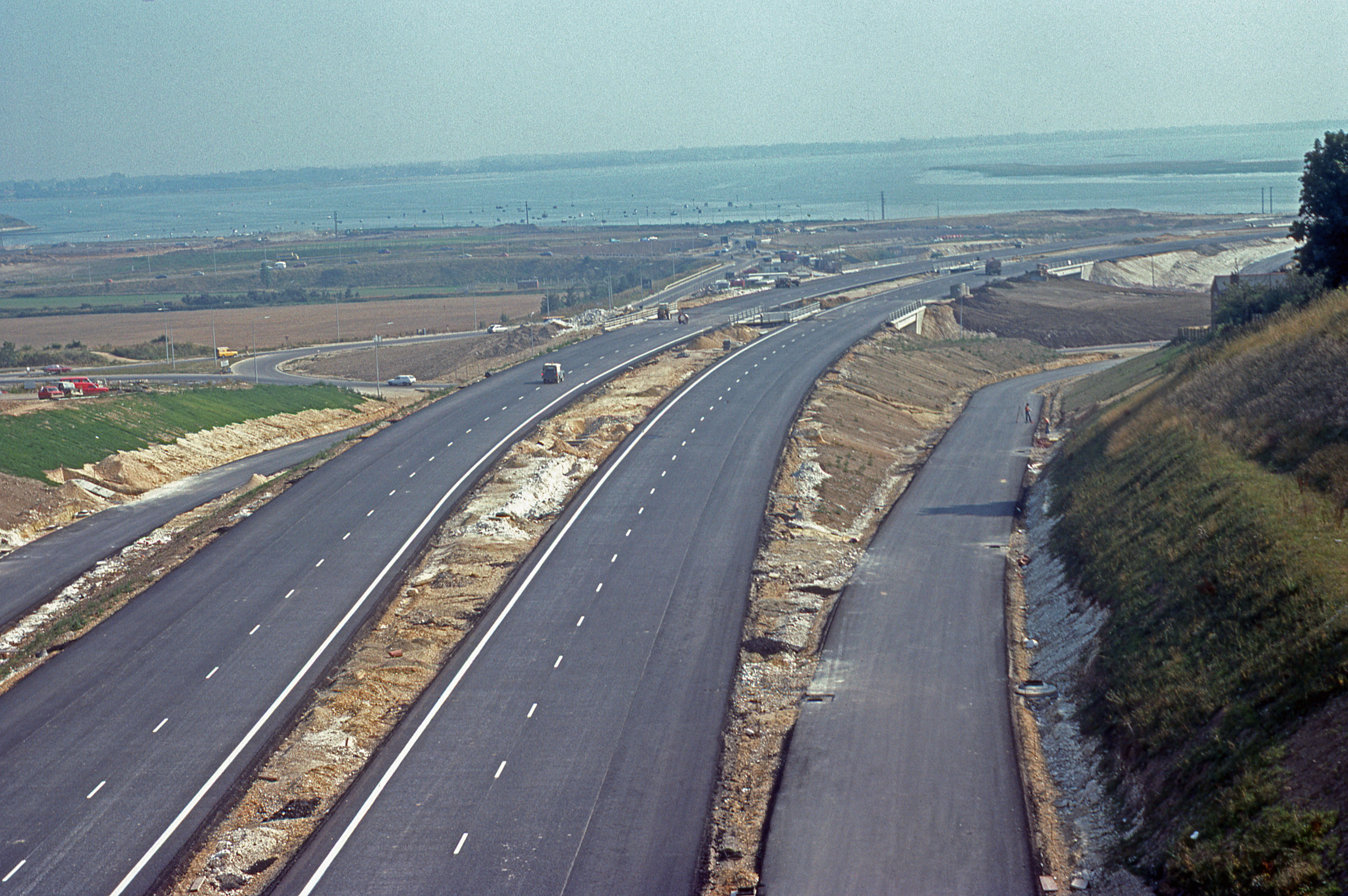
Construction in September 1979 of the A3(M)

A programme of road improvements, starting in the 1920s, transformed the road, so that it became predominantly a two- or three-lane carriageway, bypassing some town centres; south of the South Downs National Park, it included a section of motorway, the A3(M), just before the road reaches the A27 at Havant. The construction of the Kingston and Guildford bypasses in the 1920s and 1930s made use of temporary narrow-gauge railways to move the construction materials.

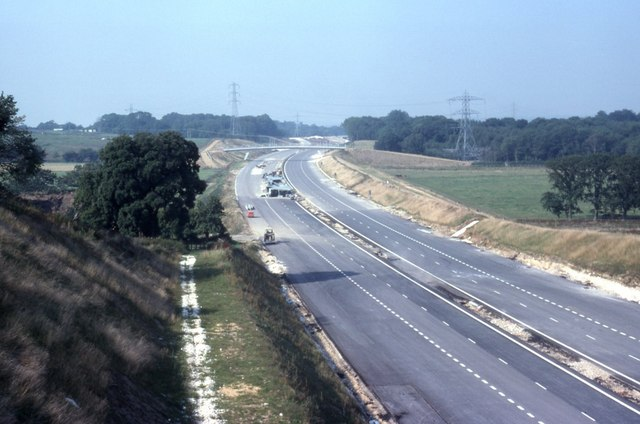
Construction of the A3(M) in 1979

Lord Montagu of Beaulieu stressed the urgency of building a Kingston bypass in 1911, but public funds were not secured before the onset of World War I and were not available in the aftermath. By the early 1920s, traffic in Kingston town centre had increased by over 160% in 10 years in the coaching town and the decision was taken in 1923 to revive the plans, with the contract worth £503,000 (equivalent to £26,300,000 in 2025). Work started in 1924, and it was opened by the Prime Minister, Stanley Baldwin, on 28 October 1927. It ran for 8.5 miles (13.7 km) from the Robin Hood Gate of Richmond Park to the outskirts of Esher. The opening ceremony concluded with refreshments for 800 guests in marquees near to the northern start/end. Its construction immediately attracted developments of housing where access was easiest. The Restriction of Ribbon Development Act 1935 came too late to prevent this private housing, which is apparent where the A3 winds through Tolworth and New Malden, where the architecture includes concrete to art nouveau apartments (Note: Main examples are Shelley Court and Byfield Court as to art nouveau by this stretch.), Mock-Tudor gabled houses and gabled Arts and Crafts movement-inspired houses. The final section of the Kingston bypass now forms part of the A309 thanks to the construction of the Esher bypass.

The complexity of the double roundabout at the junction between the A309 Kingston by-pass and the A307 led to it being referred to colloquially as the Silly Isles; later the junction officially adopted the name The Scilly Isles.

In 2011, the Hindhead Tunnel became the centrepiece of the Hindhead bypass, away from the road through the village, where the only urban set of traffic lights on the route outside London had created a bottleneck. Until 2011, the road through Hindhead was the last single-carriageway section of the route, outside London and Portsmouth.

== Route ==
Once south-west of the Elephant and Castle in Southwark, the road follows a route roughly parallel to the Portsmouth Direct line railway which goes through, rather than past, all of the towns which the road serves, with Havant and Woking 2 miles (3.2 km) and 3 miles (4.8 km), respectively, off the road.

=== Greater London ===
The A3 starts at King William Street at its junction with Gracechurch Street in the City of London, crosses the River Thames at London Bridge while entering the London Borough of Southwark, and goes south-west along Borough High Street and Newington Causeway to the Elephant and Castle roundabout. It continues along Newington Butts, and bounds then enters the London Borough of Lambeth on Kennington Park Road which becomes Clapham Road and Clapham High Street. The A3 then turns west (leaving as its straight continuation the A24) as Clapham Common North Side. Along this road, it enters the London Borough of Wandsworth, after which it runs concurrently with the A205 'South Circular' along Battersea Rise, Wandsworth Common North Side and East Hill, and goes through Wandsworth, and then the A205 carries on west towards Richmond. On West Hill, just east of the Tibbets Corner junction with the A219 near Putney Heath, the road increases from one lane each way to a three-lanes-each-way dual-carriageway and the speed limit increases from 30 to 40 mph (48 to 64 km/h). The A3 then continues south-west between Richmond Park and Wimbledon Common, as Kingston Road before beginning to bypass Kingston upon Thames while going through Roehampton Vale. The A3 enters The Royal Borough of Kingston Upon Thames just before Kingston Vale where there is a junction with the A308 for Kingston upon Thames and Richmond Park.

For the first 5 km (3.1 mi) south of Richmond Park, the A3 runs within 300 m (980 ft) of the Beverley Brook, crossing it three times. Although there is no point where the stream itself can be seen when driving along the road, the bridge parapets are visible and, for 2 km (1.2 mi), where the road runs along the edge of Wimbledon Common, the trees flanking the stream can be glimpsed across playing fields, with the lightly managed "natural" woodland of the common rising beyond. Except for the playing fields, the whole of the common, including Beverley Brook, is both a Site of Special Scientific Interest (SSSI) and a Special Area of Conservation (SAC). The speed limit then increases to 50 mph (80 km/h) before going under the Coombe Flyover. The A3 then goes on a flyover at Shannon Corner located on the edges of Motspur Park, Raynes Park and New Malden, before having an additional junction for New Malden, then Tolworth and Hook along the Kingston By-pass.

Brief features of a section of road contribute to a traffic pinch-point during peak hours around the Hook underpass. The road reduces from three lanes to two in the underpass. The speed limit at this point in the London-bound direction reduces from 70 to 50 miles per hour (113 to 80 km/h), with the first of a handful of Gatso speed enforcement cameras. If returning to London, traffic from the A309 also joins just before the underpass. (Note: This section except on bank holidays is busy weekdays from about 7:50am to 8:30am and from 5:15pm to 5:50pm.)

=== Surrey ===
The A3's Kingston By-pass now ends sooner leaving a spur junction the A309 to the Scilly Isles junction near Sandown Park, Esher, its route instead becoming the Esher By-pass on the border of Hook, London and Long Ditton, Surrey. Here the speed limit rises to 70 mph, with 3 lanes and a motorway-grade hard shoulder.

After passing Claygate, the motorway-standard section has junctions with the A244 between Esher and Oxshott, then the A245 between Cobham and Hersham. (Note: Along this road are Painshill Park, Brooklands, West Byfleet and western Woking) The road's Wisley Interchange with the M25 enables a flyover still with a 70 mph (110 km/h) speed limit. (Note: Hard shoulders, and outer barriers of the section thereafter are 'dual carriageway standard'.) It bypasses Wisley, Ockham, Ripley (and Burpham which is a suburb of Guildford) before cutting through the major town itself as a dual carriageway and changing to a 50 mph (80 km/h) speed limit. It returns to 70 mph (110 km/h) at the A31 and A246 junction before bypassing Godalming and Milford. It continues through a tunnel at Hindhead (constructed in 2011 to improve capacity and bypass the Devil's Punch Bowl) before leaving Surrey.

=== Hampshire ===
The A3 enters Hampshire just after exiting the Hindhead Tunnel, passes Liphook and Bramshott, turns SSW past Liss, then passes Petersfield. The A3's original route between Hindhead and Petersfield, passing through several villages, became the B2070. At Liss, there remains an at-grade roundabout, the only such junction on the route. Over the South Downs, it passes Clanfield and Horndean. From just north of Horndean, (still heading towards Portsmouth) the A3 separates from the A3(M) (below) and continues as London Road as far as Hilsea, south of which it is Northern Parade (Note: London Road continues as the A2047). It runs along the west side of Portsea Island which forms Portsmouth proper, roughly parallel with the M275, into the nearly waterfront centre of the city where, after passing the Catholic cathedral, it meets with the A2030. Here, it reaches Old Portsmouth, passing the Anglican cathedral and the 15th century harbour where it comes to an end at Broad Street and Portsmouth Point.

== Hindhead tunnel ==
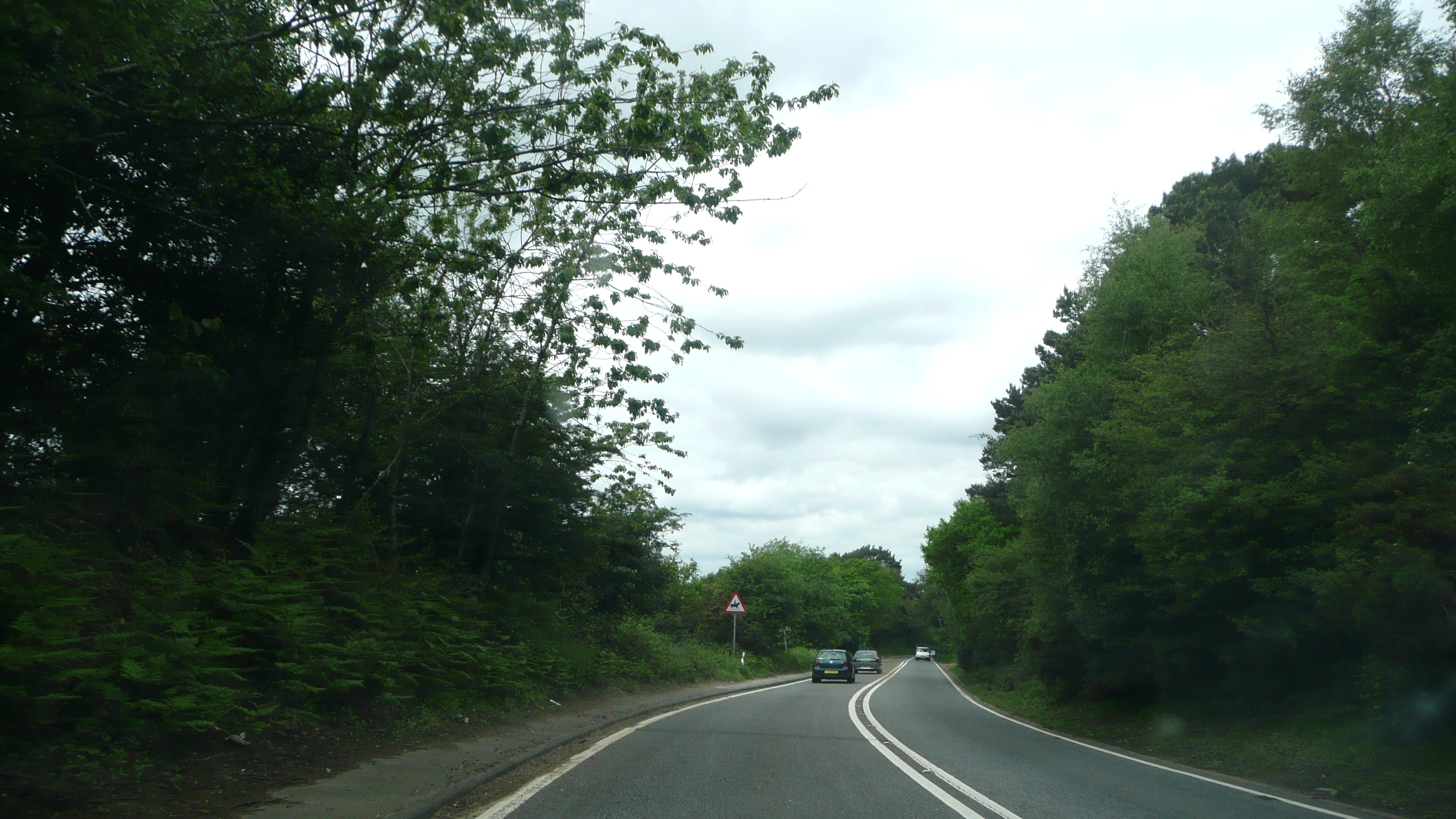
The A3 near Hindhead prior to the tunnel opening

The Hindhead Tunnel is a 1,830-metre (1.14 mi) twin bore tunnel, which cost £371 million to construct, and is the longest non-estuarial road tunnel in the UK. Transport Secretary Philip Hammond conducted the opening ceremony on 27 July 2011, though the northbound tunnel opened to traffic two days later than the southbound one, on 29 July.

The new dual carriageway diverges from the original route where the old A3 began climbing sharply as it headed towards the scenic Devil's Punch Bowl. The old road now turns right and continues into Highfield Lane. From there, the remainder of the original road to Punch Bowl Common - a short distance north-east of the Hindhead traffic lights - has been completely ripped up and returned to nature. From the south, the short and largely built-up southern stretch of old A3 (now bypassed) runs up from the Grayshott exit into Hindhead and remains in use, but has been renumbered from A3 to A333.

== Proposed developments ==
=== Ham Barn roundabout, Liss ===
Since the 2011 opening of the Hindhead Tunnel, the modern route (or, in the case of the southernmost section, its associated motorway section) is at least dual-carriageway, but at Liss is the sole at-grade roundabout. Widely considered the main traffic pinch-point and an accident hotspot (due to its unusual egg-shape and camber angle which can cause lorries at excess speed to tip over), there have been wide calls for its removal, the projected increase in traffic with the completion of the tunnel supporting the proposal. In November 2010, the Highways Agency announced it would discuss three options for the roundabout's future, but in December it announced that no change would be commenced before 2015:

- full-time signalling,
- removing the roundabout entirely (and thereby removing the A3/B3006 connection completely),
- keeping the existing system.

=== Cathedral exit, Guildford ===
The slip road exiting the A3 leading to the Royal Surrey County Hospital and the Surrey Research Park regularly creates congestion on the main A3 during peak times, when the traffic queue reaches onto the main carriageway. In May 2011, it was announced that this is to be resolved with new improvements to the traffic system directly adjacent to the A3, with work funded jointly by the University of Surrey and Surrey County Council.

=== Related urban proposals and developments ===
Various schemes exist to manage urban traffic and economise land use, and include running park and ride services. The main such scheme along the route is in Guildford. In February 2015, the Mayor of London Boris Johnson announced plans to build over a short section at Tolworth, after visiting a similar site in Boston, Massachusetts; the Mayor said "rebuilding some of our complex and ageing road network underneath our city would not only provide additional capacity for traffic, but it would also unlock surface space and reduce the impact of noise and pollution." Similar plans have been proposed for other areas of London but proven cost-prohibitive.

== A3(M) ==
A3(M)
- A3(M) highlighted in blue
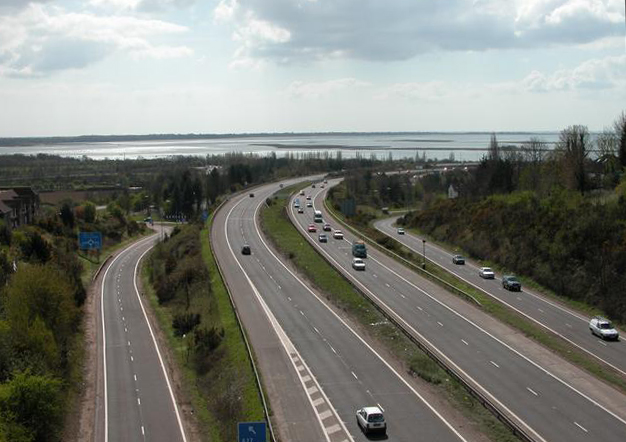
- The junction between the A3(M) and the A27

Route information
- Maintained by National Highways
- Length: 5 mi (8.0 km)
- Existed: 1979–present

Major junctions
- Northeast end: Horndean
- Southwest end: Bedhampton

Location
- Country: United Kingdom
- Primary destinations: (London), (Portsmouth), (Chichester), (Petersfield), Waterlooville

Road network
- Roads in the United Kingdom; Motorways; A and B road zones

This section of the road was opened in 1979 and acts as an alternative to the A3 road in this part of Hampshire.

=== Junctions ===
A3(M) motorway junctions
Northbound exits	Junction	Southbound exits
Road continues as the A3 to Petersfield and London	A3; Terminus (J1)	Horndean, Clanfield A3; Portsmouth, Hayling Island A3(M)
No exit	A3; Terminus (J1)	Start of motorway
Horndean, Cowplain B2149	J2	Emsworth, Rowlands Castle B2149, Cowplain
Waterlooville B2150	J3	Waterlooville, Purbrook, Leigh Park B2150
Purbrook, Leigh Park	J4	No exit
Start of motorway	J5; Terminus; A27	Bedhampton, Farlington, Drayton
Petersfield, London, Waterlooville, Leigh Park (A3(M)); Bedhampton B2177	J5; Terminus; A27	Brighton, Chichester, Havant, Hayling Island A27(E); Portsmouth, Southampton (M27) A27(W)

== Cycling ==
There are several cycle routes which follow the route of the A3.

=== London ===
In London, Cycle Superhighway 7 (CS7) runs either side of the A3 from Elephant and Castle to Clapham Common. The route is signposted and marked using painted blue cycle logos, carrying cyclists through Kennington, Stockwell, and Clapham. North from Elephant and Castle, CS7 runs along the A300/Southwark Bridge Road towards the City. South of Clapham Common, CS7 runs along the A24 to Colliers Wood, via Balham and Tooting.

Between Wandsworth and Kingston Vale, a shared-use path runs alongside the A3 for cyclists and pedestrians. The path is segregated from other road traffic and links to cycle paths which run alongside the A308/Kingston Hill. This provides Norbiton with a traffic-free route to Wandsworth, which is also the terminus of Cycle Superhighway 8 (CS8 to Millbank).

=== Surrey and Hampshire ===
Shared-use paths and cycle lanes run alongside the A3 at points between the Greater London boundary and Portsmouth.

Between Thursley and Milford in Surrey, cycle crossings of the slip roads exist for cyclists travelling along the cycle lanes.

There is a cycle path between Liss and Petersfield which runs along the Portsmouth-bound (southbound) side of the A3. The route joins the A3 south of West Liss and leaves the dual-carriageway to the north of Petersfield (at Farnham Road). The route between Liss town centre and Farnham Road is part of National Cycle Route 22 (NCR 22).

South of Petersfield, National Cycle Route 222 (NCR 222) follows the route of the A3 until the route reaches Waterlooville. The route passes through the Queen Elizabeth Country Park and passes along the eastern rim of Clanfield. The main cycle route between Petersfield and the Country Park follows NCR 22 through Buriton.

== See also ==
- Great Britain road numbering scheme
- List of motorways in the United Kingdom
- British industrial narrow gauge railways

== Notes and references ==
Notes
