= Knox Guild of Design and Crafts =

English group of artists and craftspeople

The Knox Guild of Arts and Crafts was formed in 1912 by a group of about twenty art students at Kingston School of Art, Surrey, England in honour of the Liberty designer Archibald Knox. Knox had resigned from his post as Head of Design at Kingston School of Art in 1912 following criticism of his teaching. Knox was officially the Master of the Guild, although by then he had returned to the Isle of Man. He did however return and exhibited with them. They rented rooms at 24A Market Place, Kingston, until about 1914. They followed Knox's mantra Aim for order, hope for beauty.

"The main object of the Guild is to carry out Mr. Knox's teachings, and to encourage by public exhibitions and craft demonstrations a wider public interest in the design of personal and household belongings. These exhibitions have created much interest and have attracted hundreds of people."

In 1912, following criticism of his teaching methods, Archibald Knox quit Kingston School of Art. Together with other students from their design class, sisters Denise and Winifred Tuckfield quit Kingston School of Art to found the Knox Guild of Design and Craft. They rented premises at 24A Market Place, Kingston. The Knox Guild exhibited in Kingston Museum Art Gallery in 1914, then annually from 1919 until 1935, and at the Whitechapel Gallery in East London in 1921, 1923 and 1925.

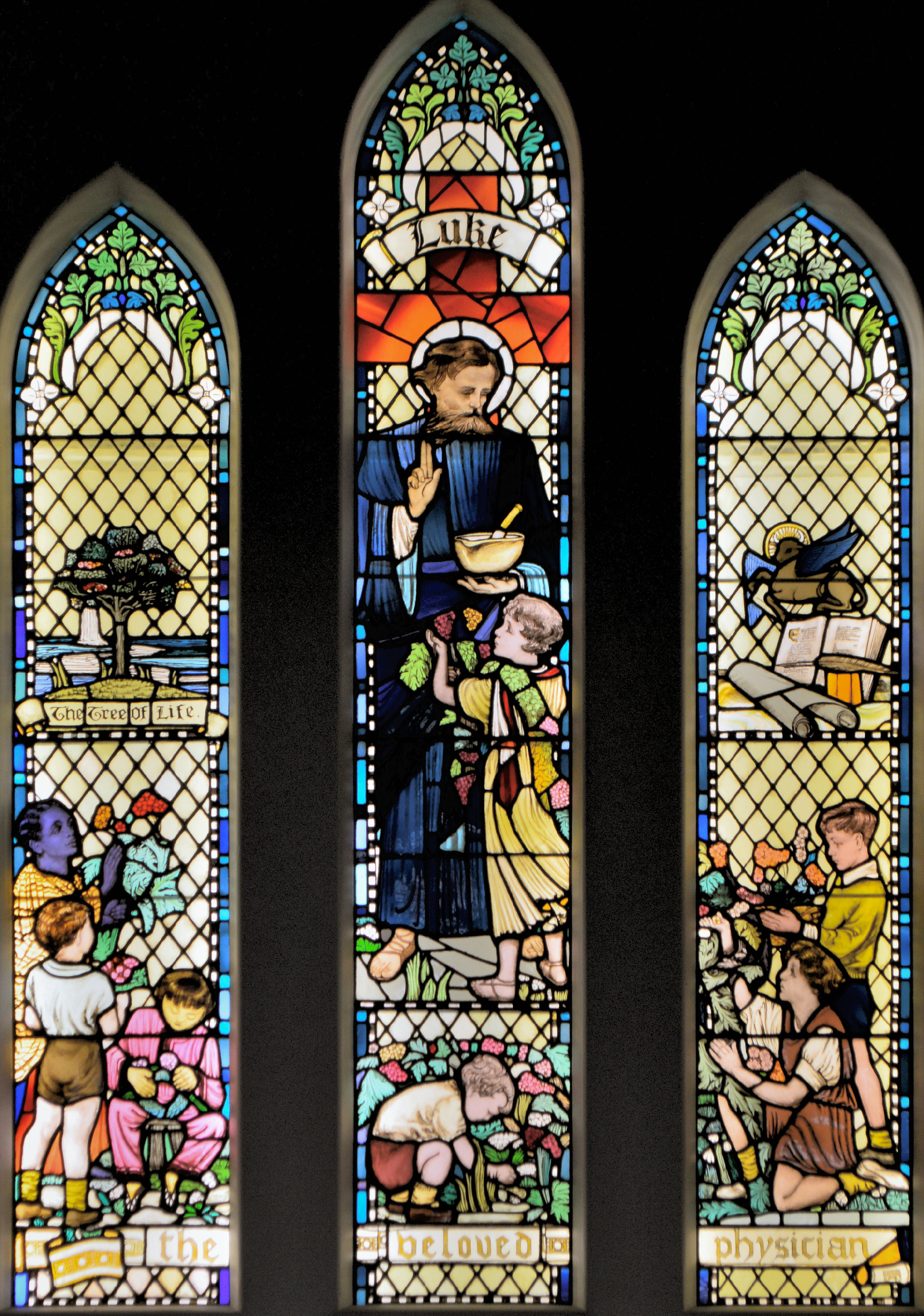
Stained glass by Maude Bishop, Surbiton Hill Methodist Church

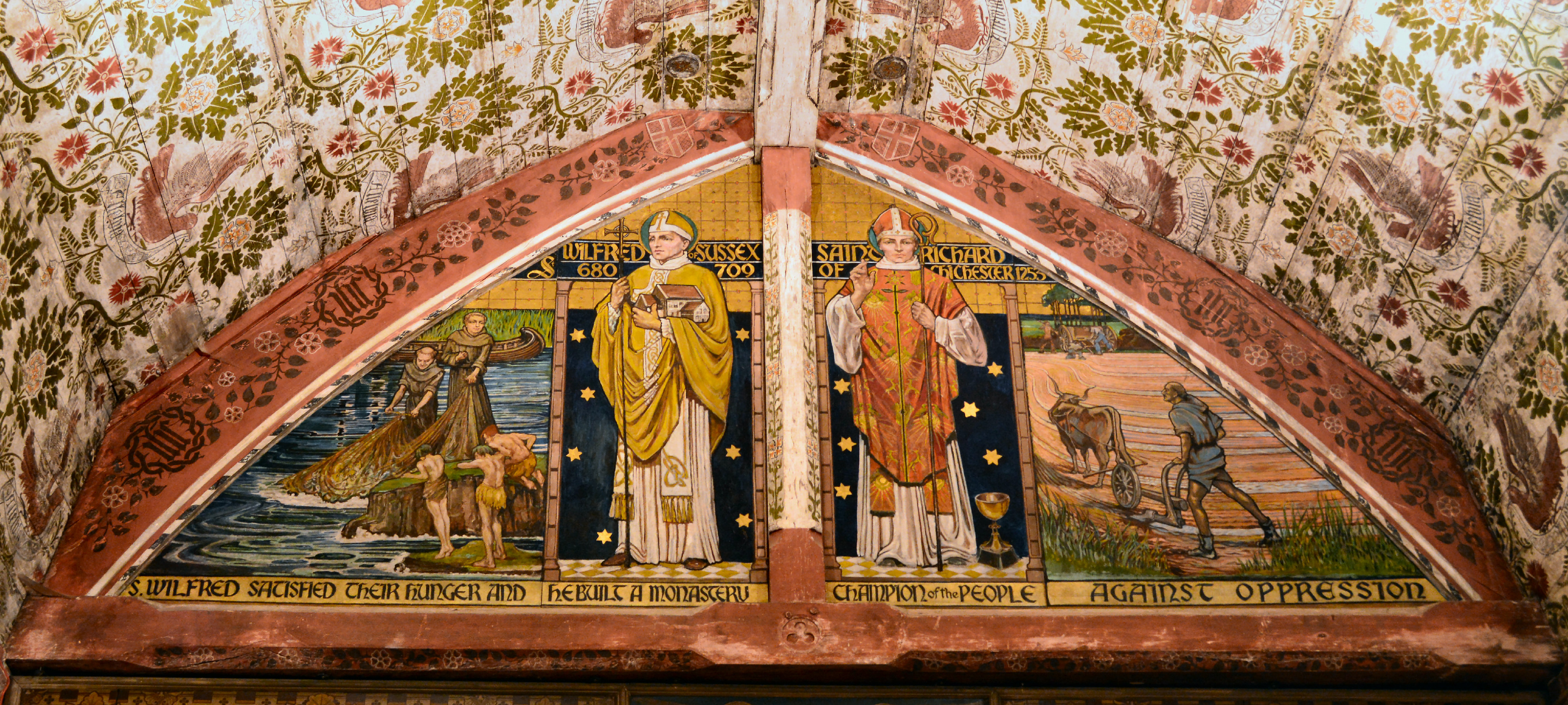
Painting by Maude Bishop, St Wulfran's Church, Ovingdean

Other members of the Knox Guild included the organisation's President Edmund Holding, a tailor by trade and a member of the Royal Watercolour Society. His wife May Holding was also a founding member. She made hand spun, hand woven, vegetable dyed furnishings for their home, and orange curtains for the Wrens’ home Potter's Croft. She wrote the book Notes on Spinning and Dyeing Wool published in 1922. Maudie E. Bishop was a stained glass craftworker. She made decorative glass panels for Potter's Croft. In 1947, she was commissioned to make a stained glass window for Surbiton Hill Methodist Church. Located above the sanctuary, it commemorates Mayor of Surbiton Herbert Samuel Durbin. Annie Begg wrote Raffia and Mabel Roffey wrote Simple Basketry For Homes and Schools, both published by Pitman in 1930. Mabel Pope made silver jewellery decorated with semi-precious stones and Molly Walters designed tiles and textiles.

The President was Edmund Holding, who was a member of the Royal Watercolour Society. The Secretary was Winifred Tuckfield, known for her weaving and leatherwork. Other members included Denise Tuckfield, May Holding, Mabel Roffey, Molly Walters, who designed tiles and textiles, Mabel Pope, who made silver jewellery, Annie Begg, and Maude Bishop, who created stained glass including the memorial window at Surbiton Hill Methodist Church.

The Guild exhibited annually, initially in the Kingston Art Gallery from 1913 and later at the Whitechapel Gallery.

KNOX GUILD OF DESIGN AND CRAFT

Mr. Archibald Knox, its founder, is represented, by some 20 water-colour sketches of Manx scenery; other exhibitors in the same section are Mr. Edgar T. Holding, Mr. Henry Wren, and Mr. John Bacon. Miss Winifred Tuckfield, the secretary, and other ladies, give demonstrations of hand-spinning and weaving, and show many beautiful fabrics made by hand, and dyed with the vegetable dyes extracted and used by the members. Other exhibits include stained and decorated leather work; Gesso mirrors; Oxshott pottery, made by Mr. and Mrs. Wren; a remarkable variety of jewelry and necklaces, made by Miss Mabel Pope and others; exquisite embroidery by Miss Gertrude Connor Smith; dainty fabrics in silk and wool; stained glass, and raffia baskets, hats, and mats. The exhibition attracted a large number of visitors, who were much interested in seeing the members of the Guild at work at their various crafts.

Arts And Crafts At Whitechapel

The work of the guild combines utility and beauty in the most satisfying manner. Better still, visitors to the Art Gallery may watch the creators of the admirable exhibits at work at bench, loom, and wheel. A host of delightful coloured things like wraps and shawls, curtains and hangings, are on view, and in the centre of the hall there are the spinning-wheels on which many of them were made. In the corner devoted to pottery there are all sorts of cups and platters, bowls, vases, and candlesticks, beautifully shaped and coloured. Mrs. Wren, who has made many of them, will turn a vase to any shape that one may wish while the visitor, watching her hands, will probably wonder if she ought not, after all, to have been a violinist. And close by there is a lady who sets jewels in chased silver setting - from her stall you may buy a beautiful ring set with a cut stone for ' half a guinea. The leather work and embroidery are marked by simple, but pleasing designs, and the raffia work deserves a note to itself, for, as the catalogue explains, "the fibre for raffia work can be bought at any corn merchant's shop. "

In 1915 Denise Tuckfield married Henry Wren. Then in 1920 they built a house in Oxshott, Surrey and started the Oxshott Pottery.

The Guild continued exhibiting up to at least 1933.

== Original Members ==
- Tony Althopp
- C. Ballard
- Annie Louisa Begg (1874-1973)
- Nora Black
- Maude 'Maudie' Emily Bishop (1890-1975)
- Marian Coombes
- Celia Ellls
- Elizabeth Ellis
- Dorothy Gruchy
- Lilian Harding
- May Harris
- Edgar 'Edmund' Thomas Holding (1870-1952)
- May Holding (b.1869)
- Lilian Parker
- Annie Parker
- Mabel I. Pope (c.1888-1970)
- Jessie Smith
- Denise K Tuckfield
- Winifred Tuckfield (1889-1955)
- Harold A Winser
- ? Williams

== Publications ==
Begg, Annie L (1930) Raffia; methods and suggestions for work, in the home, schools, and women's institutes. London, Sir Isaac Pitman & Sons

Begg, Annie L (1950) Raffia. Methods And Suggestions. London, Pitman Publishing Company

Holding, May (1922) Notes on Spinning and Dyeing Wool. London, Women's Printing Society.

Holding, May (1949) Notes on spinning and dyeing wool;: With which is included some interesting information on the various vegetable dyes and directions for dyeing raffia. 4th edition. Skilbeck Brothers Limited

Roffey, Mabel (1930) Simple Basketry for Homes and Schools. London, Sir Isaac Pitman & Sons

Roffey, Mabel (1937) Simple basketry for homes and schools, Including willow basketry for women (Pitman's craft for all series)
