= Denise Wren =

British potter and craftsperson

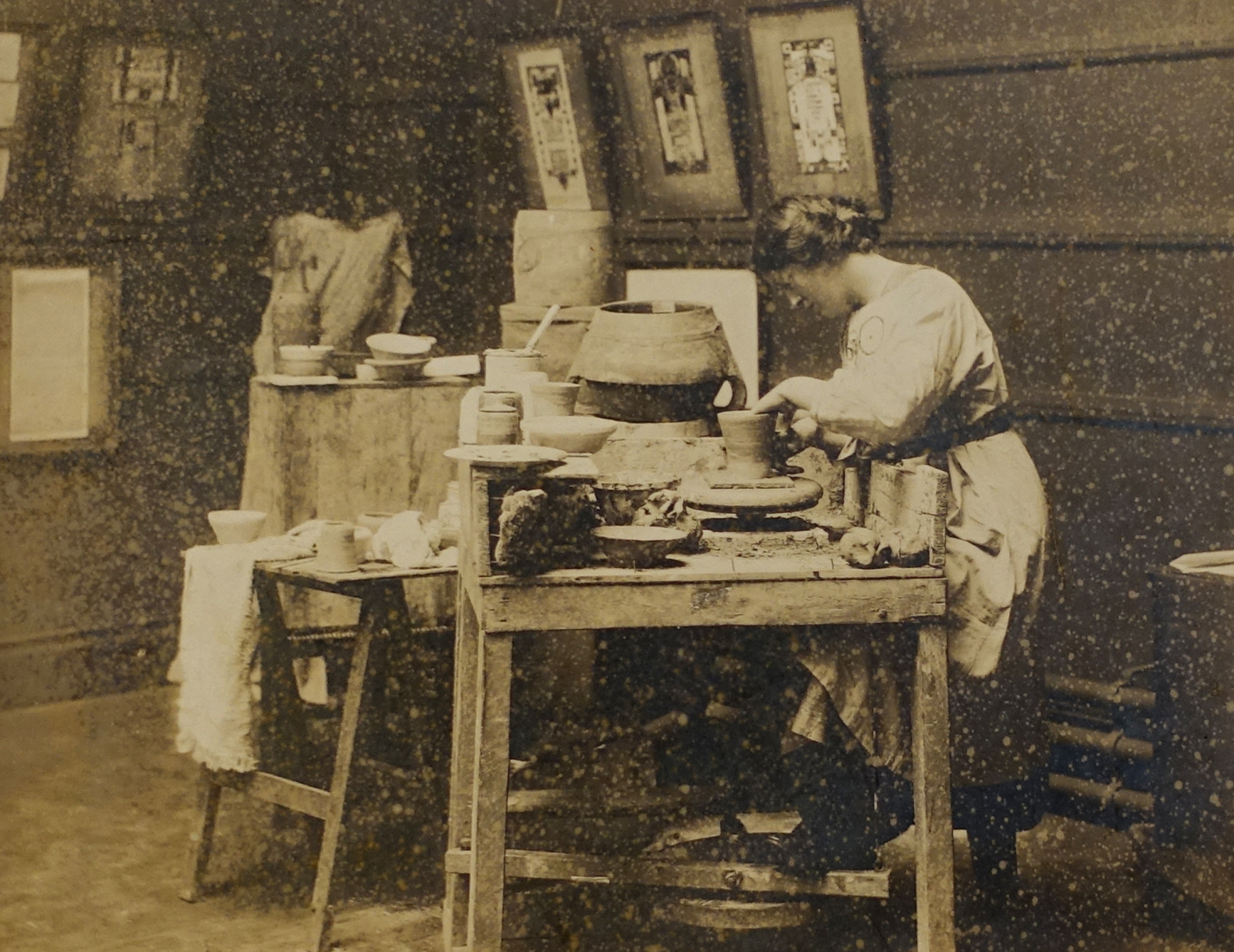
- Wren demonstrating throwing on the wheel in Kingston Museum Art Gallery c. 1920
- Born: Denise Tuckfield; 7 January 1891; Lake View, Albany, Western Australia
- Died: 1979; Devon
- Education: Kingston School of Art, Guildford School of Art, Camberwell College of Arts, Royal College of Art
- Known for: Studio pottery, Textiles
- Movement: Arts and crafts
- Spouse: Henry Wren

Denise Wren (née Tuckfield; 7 January 1891 – 1979) was an Australian-born British studio potter and craftsperson. Wren was one of the first female studio potters in Britain. She studied and taught with the Kingston School of Art, Knox Guild and Camberwell College of Arts. Wren and her family subsequently set up the Oxshott Pottery and wrote on the subjects of ceramics, textiles and making.

== Biography ==
Denise Tuckfield was born in Lake View, Albany, Western Australia on 7 January 1891. Her family, including her sister Winnifred and two brothers, moved to East Molesey, Surrey, England in 1900. In 1915, Denise Tuckfield married Henry Wren (d. 1947). Their daughter, Rosemary Wren (b. 1922) also worked in ceramics. Wren kept and bred budgerigars and parakeets as well as bees at the Oxshott family home. Wren moved to Hittisleigh, Devon in 1978 and died there in 1979.

== Ceramic art career ==
=== Kingston School of Art and the Knox Guild ===
From 1907 to 1912 Tuckfield attended Kingston School of Art where she studied under Archibald Knox. Here, she learned to throw pots on the wheel from Mr. Mercer, an employee at the local Norbiton Potteries and Brickworks. He also fired her ceramics in his kiln, including a tile with a flying fish motif featured in a 1909 issue of fine and decorative arts magazine The Studio.

In 1912, following criticism of his teaching methods, Archibald Knox quit Kingston School of Art. Together with other students from their design class, sisters Denise and Winifred Broun-Morrison joined Knox in protest to co-found the Knox Guild of Design and Craft.

=== The Oxshott Pottery at Potter's Croft ===
After her marriage to Henry Wren in 1915, the couple built their own house to Denise Wren's design: Potter's Croft, a workspace and home at Oxshott in Surrey. Here, they set up the Oxshott Pottery which produced brightly glazed functional earthenware products such as bowls, dishes and vases which they sold at agricultural and horticultural shows during the interwar period. They taught a summer school and wrote books on pottery. Wren also taught evening classes at Teddington School of Art. Wren pioneered designs for small scale kilns, which she sold by mail order to aspiring amateur potters, both in the UK and abroad.

The Oxshott Pottery participated in the British Empire Exhibition of 1924–25 and in the Artist Craftsman Exhibitions organised annually from 1923 to 1938 by Henry Wren at the Central Hall, Westminster.

=== Other institutions ===
Wren studied further with Henry Hopkins at Camberwell School of Art in 1920. She returned to study from 1945 to 1947 at the Guildford School of Art with Helen Pincombe and continued to the Royal College of Art from 1947 to 1950.

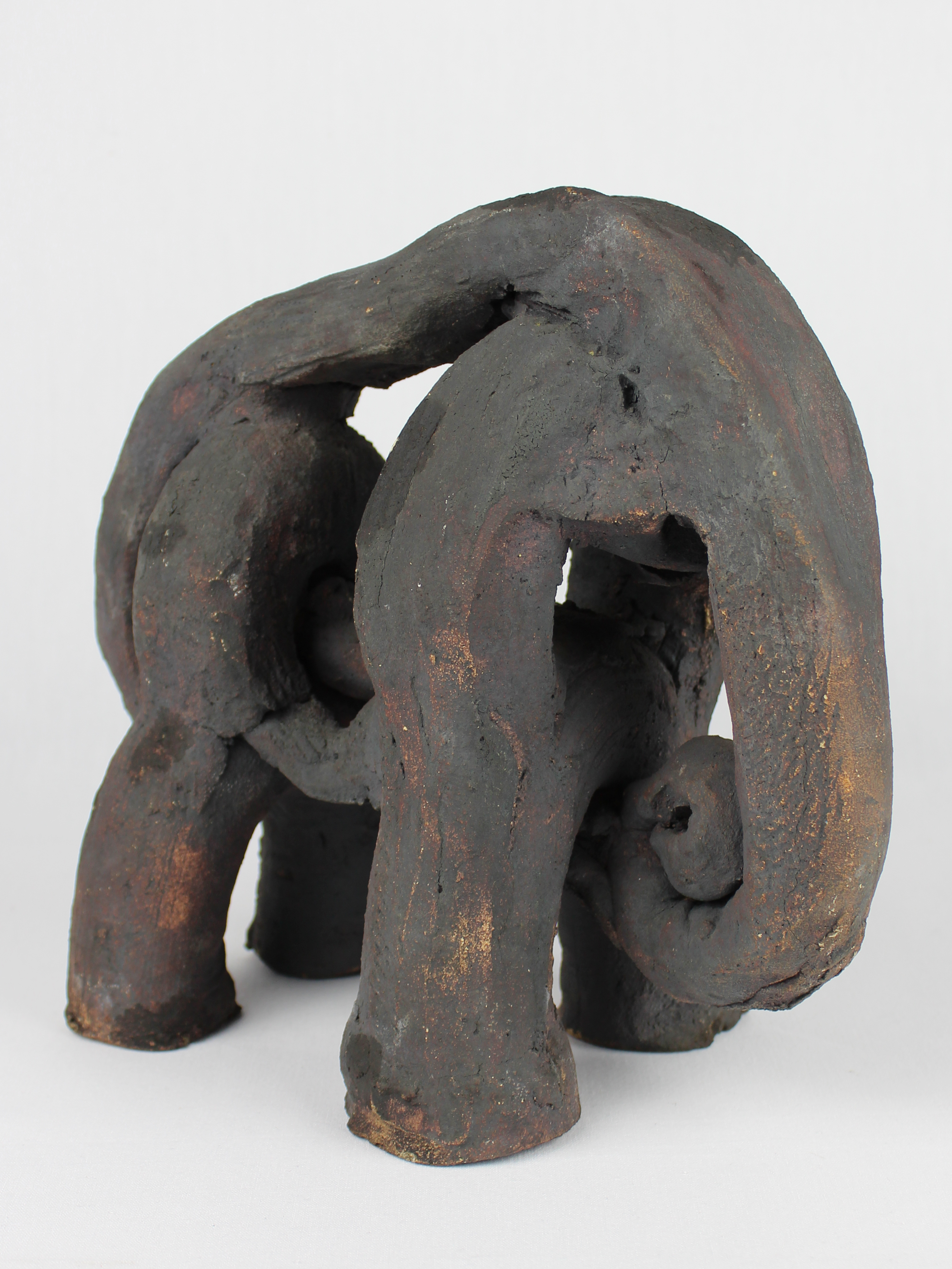
Elephant figure made from thickly extruded clay. Made in 1978. From the W.A. Ismay Studio Ceramics Collection at York Art Gallery

=== Later career ===
Henry Wren died in 1947 and the Wren's daughter Rosemary, a potter also known for her animal figures, joined the running of Oxshott Pottery with her mother. During the 1950s, Wren and Rosemary Wren experimented at Oxshott with a technique called salt glazing. The Wrens developed a new kiln to fire salt-glazed stoneware. Denise and Rosemary Wren became known for their revival of salt glazed stoneware. They were founder members of the Craft Potters Association in 1958 and used it, and various London galleries to sell their work through the 1950s and 1960s. Towards the end of her life, Wren was known for her handbuilt elephant figures. ‘[T]he variety, vitality and starkness of these creations' were apparent in even a small group when displayed. The pottery moved to Hittisleigh, Devon in 1978, a year before Wren's death.

== Ethos and style ==
During the early 20th-century, British pottery production was a large scale industry and pottery was not taught in art schools. This began to change in 1920 when Bernard Leach established the Leach Pottery at St. Ives in Cornwall and in 1925 William Staite Murray became pottery tutor at the Royal College of Art. In contrast to Leach and his followers, who mainly made wheel-thrown pots, Wren used a wide variety of techniques such as building with slabs or coils of clay and making tiles and figurines in moulds: partly inspired by her lessons from Archibald Knox. Denise Wren's early pots were often incised with Celtic designs inspired by Archibald Knox. Wren also used commercially produced glazes, though often in an experimental way. Ceramicists like Denise Wren were part of a new aesthetic movement that began to emerge after the First World War. 'British Studio Potters' -men and women working alone or in small workshops designing and making pots and figurines. Wren's technical understanding of ceramic work was demonstrated at a meeting of the Craft Potters Association in 1960 where she produced a detailed scheme of categories against which a pot's quality could be judged. Each category was in turn, comprehensive: one contained 87 questions. Michael Casson referred to it as 'a brilliant piece of planning'.

== Textile designs ==
From the late 1930s, Denise Wren began to design textiles to compensate for dwindling sales of pottery at Oxshott. Under the name of the Knox Guild, she took a stand at the British Industries Fair in 1937. This enabled her to make contact with some Manchester based textile printers like Grafton's, Simpson and Godlee, Tootals and Whitworth and Mitchell. Wren also became a member of the National Register of Industrial Art Designers. Kingston Museum’s archive holds records of over 160 pattern designs she sold between the mid 1940s and 1951 to manufacturers like these.

== Legacy ==
Wren's work is in several regional and national collections:

- Aberystwyth University Ceramics Collection
- Crafts Study Centre at Farnham, Surrey
- Kingston Museum
- Shipley Art Gallery
- Victoria and Albert Museum
- York Art Gallery

In 1975, Wren was made an honorary life member of the Craft Potters Association.

== Publications and exhibitions ==
=== Books ===
- Wren, Denise; Wren, Henry (1924). Oxshott hand-made pottery
- Wren, Denise; Wren, Henry (1930). Handcraft pottery, for workshop and school. London: s.n.
- Wren, Denise; Wren, Henry (1932). Pottery, the finger-built methodes. London: s.n.
- Wren, Denise; Wren, Rosemary (1952). Pottery making; making pots and building and firing small kilns,. London: Pitman.

=== Solo exhibitions ===
- Denise Wren: Hope for Beauty (2017-2018) Kingston Museum

=== Group exhibitions ===
With the Knox Guild:

- [Titles Unknown] (1914, 1919-1935) Kingston Museum Art Gallery, with live pottery demonstrations
- [Titles Unknown] (1921, 1923, 1935) Whitechapel Art Gallery, with live pottery demonstrations

Other exhibitions:

- More British Potters (1972) Kettle's Yard, Cambridge. Organised by Henry Rothschild and Primavera.
- The Wrens and the Oxshott Pottery (1984) Crafts Study Centre, Bath (former location)
- Women's Work (2019) Ditchling Museum of Art + Craft, Sussex
