= Malden Rushett =

Coordinates: 51.336769°N 0.320285°W

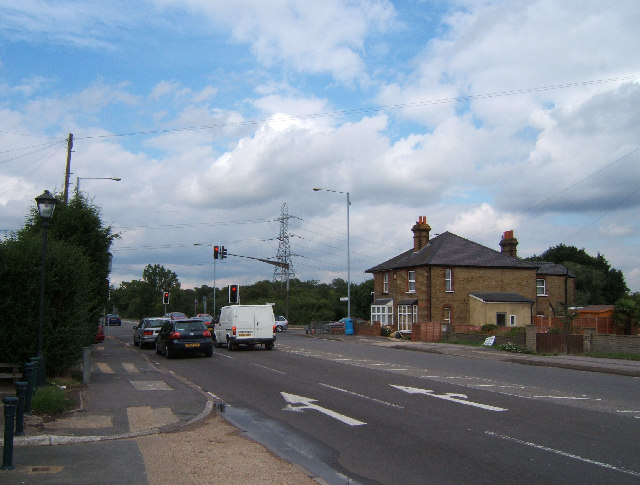
- Crossroads at Malden Rushett

- Location within Greater London
- Population: 430 2021 census
- OS grid reference: TQ171610
- London borough: Kingston
- Ceremonial county: Greater London
- Region: London
- Country: England
- Sovereign state: United Kingdom
- Post town: CHESSINGTON
- Postcode district: KT9
- Dialling code: 01372
- Police: Metropolitan
- Fire: London
- Ambulance: London
- UK Parliament: Kingston and Surbiton
- London Assembly: South West

Malden Rushett is a semi-rural neighbourhood at the southern tip of the Royal Borough of Kingston upon Thames, London. Adjoining a signpost with the name of the locality is the main local cluster of homes, but which are technically and historically in Chessington. The land otherwise is mostly Metropolitan Green Belt: woods with in the west specifically having patches of stony and sandy gorse-and-heather heathland (see Oxshott Heath and Woods) and farmland, and it is between the larger suburban villages and towns of Chessington, Epsom, Ashtead, Leatherhead and Oxshott.

== History ==
Malden Rushett and the far south of Chessington to its west which is often conflated. The map of 1884 is updated with a grey note of where the modern cluster of homes is, within Chessington.

Rushett (Note: An occasionally noted synonym) was a detached part of the parish of Malden, from which it sat a little higher, centred 3.5 miles (5.6 km) southwest, and a little more by track. On 24 March 1884 it was finally transferred to the relatively new ecclesastical parish of Chessington which had been founded as and remained a mere chapelry of Malden for centuries. This meant until 1884 the people working in Malden Rushett paid no part in the upkeep, charities nor perhaps attendance of the Chessington chapel (Note: colloquiallly called its church) but only the church of the mother parish, (Old) Malden, itself a possession of Merton Priory/Monastery before its abolition by Henry VIII, and one which retained its clergy appointment links with Merton College, Oxford as to both places of worship.

Malden Rushett and South Chessington was part of the Municipal Borough of Surbiton (from 1933) until the latter became a constituent part of Greater London Borough, in 1965, under the London Government Act 1963. It was during this time the building of most of the commonly Malden Rushett-described homes on the adjoining part of the crossroads, so west of Malden Rushett's limits, in South Chessington took place.

== Facilities ==
Malden Rushett tehnically is all the land east of the crossroads of the A243 road from Kingston upon Thames to Leatherhead and the B280 from Oxshott to Epsom. However its locality sign means residents use the signpost in preference to the isolated post town of which they are part, and there are a few short streets west of that large 'village' sign, two pubs and a petrol station incorporating an M&S Simply Food shop.

Malden Rushett is two miles from its road to the south that links into Junction 9 of the M25 motorway.

Immediately beyond a north-west border is the Explorer Gate (south entrance and car park) of Chessington World of Adventures & Zoo Resort.

== Rushett Common ==
South of Malden Rushett is Rushett Common, consisting of two strips of woodland alongside the A243 to the extended limit of London (with Surrey). These are bounded by the Surrey woodlands of Prince's Coverts to the west and Epsom Common to the east. Within the common is Telegraph Hill – earlier known as Cabbage Hill – which was the site of a station on the Admiralty Shutter telegraph line. This used the shutter system to communicate between London and Portsmouth from 1796 until 1816. The buildings were small two-roomed wooden huts with a frame which held the six wooden shutters. The station was replaced by a semaphore station built at the top of street Telegraph Hill, Claygate.

== Transport and locale ==
Malden Rushett was due to have had a railway station built as part of the Southern Railway's extension from Motspur Park to Leatherhead via Chessington. The line reached Chessington South in 1939 and work was well underway on the final part of the line to Malden Rushett and Leatherhead, which was expected to stimulate further housing development beyond Chessington. The railway was extended beyond Chessington South station as far as Chalky Lane, with a bridge built over this road. Work was halted due to the outbreak of World War II, although the Royal Engineers did build a further railway embankment south of Chalky Lane which went as far as Chessington Wood.

Following Parliament's passing after the war of the Metropolitan Green Belt, new satellite towns were preferred and on intervening green and blue buffers little housing development could take place. Thus, the revenue of a new station at Malden Rushett would have been very low, further purchase of land uneconomic and the plan ceased.

The village is now served by the London Buses route 465, while the 65 terminates at the nearby Chessington World of Adventures as part of its night route, with route 71 also terminating there. A footpath (mostly pavement) connects Leatherhead and Chessington through Malden Rushett, and various lightly and densely wooded paths connect Oxshott and Epsom (run roughly east-to-west).

=== Adjoining places ===
Clockwise from north:

- Chessington
- Epsom
- Ashtead and Leatherhead
- Oxshott

=== Nearest railway stations ===
- Chessington South railway station
- Chessington North railway station

=== Bus routes ===
- London Buses route 465

== Local and national elections ==
Ward containing Malden Rushett

Malden Rushett (including the more populous western strip of land popularly included in its definition in recent years) is a small demographic component of the largest ward of the Royal and London borough. Residents of South Chessington and Malden Rushett together elect 3 councillors to Kingston upon Thames London Borough Council, every four years, such as in 2026. For national (General Elections) the locality is part of Kingston and Surbiton, a consituency making up a southern division of the Borough.

== Prominent residents ==
- Andrew Mackinlay, UK politician

== Notes and references ==
Notes

Next station upwards	Admiralty Shutter telegraph line 1795	Next station downwards
Putney Heath	Malden Rushett	Netley Heath
