= Prince's Coverts =

Woodland in Surrey, England

Coordinates: 51.333°N 0.334°W

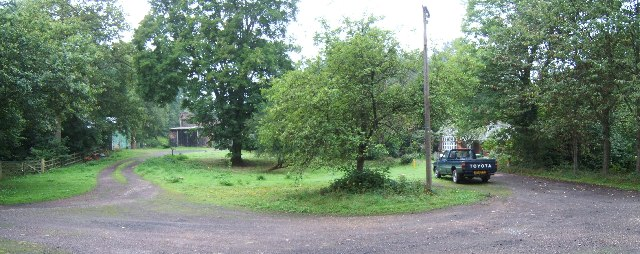
A clearing in Prince's Coverts

Prince's Coverts is an area of 864 acres (3.50 km^{2}; 1.350 sq mi) of managed woodland in Oxshott, Surrey, England, to which there is public access. It is owned and managed by the Crown Estate who refer to the area as Oxshott Woods. It adjoins a slither of land separating Malden Rushett in London, the Pachesham Park estate and Leatherhead Golf Course to the east, and smaller Oxshott Heath and Woods to the west as well as all the easternmost of Oxshott's large, detached houses.

== Geography ==
Princes Coverts is 864 acres (349 hectares) of managed woodland owned by the Crown Estate. It includes, separated by roads, a minor northern woodland beyond Fairoaks Lane, Great Oakes and Sixty Acre Wood, and the irregularly shaped (partly converted to other use) Woodlands Park to the south.

The southernmost portion of the very long and quite narrow, almost rectangular Crown Estate has been assigned to and converted to Queen Elizabeth's Foundation for Disabled People's Training College and its Dorincourt home for the disabled, Woodlands Park Golf Course, Leatherhead, and Tyrwhitt House, a combat stress centre.

While the south drains southward to Mole 0.5 miles (0.80 km) south of the training college, the north, divided by rises, contains three sources of the Rythe and drains northward. The remaining Prince's Coverts area is referred to by the Crown as Oxshott Woods.

== History ==
Prince's Coverts is named after Prince (later King) Leopold I of Belgium, who lived at Claremont Park, Esher 1 mile (1.6 km) north-west, which remains linked by a bridleway across Arbrook Common and Farm which has two white-painted metal coal tax posts.

The Claremont Estate was purchased for him in 1816. He later acquired nearby common land which became a shooting estate. This area became known as Prince's Coverts. Following his death, the estate was repurchased by the Crown since which it has been managed by the Crown Estate.

== Land Features ==
- Jessop's Well (recorded in some maps as Chalybeate) - a mineral spa converted to a very small spa house that was built in the mid 18th century. The water was sold for a period for 6d per bottle to owner-occupiers of Berkeley Square, London.
- Horns Hill - The highest point of the relatively gentle rises in Prince's Coverts at 260 feet (79 metres), is one of a series of knolls consisting of gravel and London clay in a band north of the centre of much higher North Downs where deposits have made for a loam-rich soil. Geologically and in soil terms this range extends through Wimbledon, Streatham Hill, Tulse Hill, Sydenham and Penge.

== Maps ==
The Crown Estate publish a leaflet with a detailed map.

== Access ==
The Crown Estate leaflet mentioned below was scanned in 2008, when the Coverts were fenced in, requiring a key for access, but since 2014, access for walkers no longer requires a key and signs indicate that walkers are welcome. Horse riders require a permit.

There are many paths through the woodland. There is a 3.5 mile waymarked trail starting at Prince's Gate.

The entrances are:

- Highgate Cottage Gate: on B280 (Fairoak Lane).
- Prince's Gate: on A244
- Track to D'Abernon Farm by The Star pub, A243 (Leatherhead Road).
- Footpath to/from Prince's Drive, Oxshott (from gated, private road via a stile, no key needed).
- Narrow gap at NE corner on Fairoak Lane, almost opposite road to Chessington World of Adventures.

== More information ==
- Welcome to Prince's Coverts Oxshott - Leaflet published by The Crown Estate Office, The Great Park, Windsor, SL4 2HT
