= Oxshott Pottery =

The Oxshott Pottery was set up by Denise Wren and Henry Wren at their home, Potters Croft, in Oxshott, Surrey in 1920 (105 years ago). The pottery had a reputation as a successful studio pottery, producing brightly glazed earthenware pottery; examples of their work can be found in the Victoria and Albert Museum, the Crafts Study Centre, Farnham, Surrey, and Kingston Museum Art Gallery.

== Publications ==
- Wren, Henry & Denise (1928) Handcraft Pottery for workshop and school. Sir Isaac Pitman & Sons
- Wren, Henry & Denise (1932) Pottery: The Finger-built methods. Sir Isaac Pitman & Sons
- Wren, Denise & Rosemary (1952) Pottery Making: Making Pots and Building and Firing Small Kilns. London : Pitman
