= Kingston History Centre =

Kingston History Centre is the local history library and archive for the Royal Borough of Kingston upon Thames. It is based in Court 1 of the former Kingston Magistrates Court at Guildhall, High Street, Kingston upon Thames, KT1 1EU. The History Centre was previously known at the Local History Room, based at North Kingston Centre, Richmond Road. Kingston History Centre is part of the wider Kingston Museum and Heritage Service, which also includes Kingston Museum. The Kingston History Centre is an archive accredited by The National Archives.

Any member of the public, private researcher or student is welcome to visit the History Centre during normal opening hours. The collections are free to browse but are reference only. Reproductions are available for a fee.

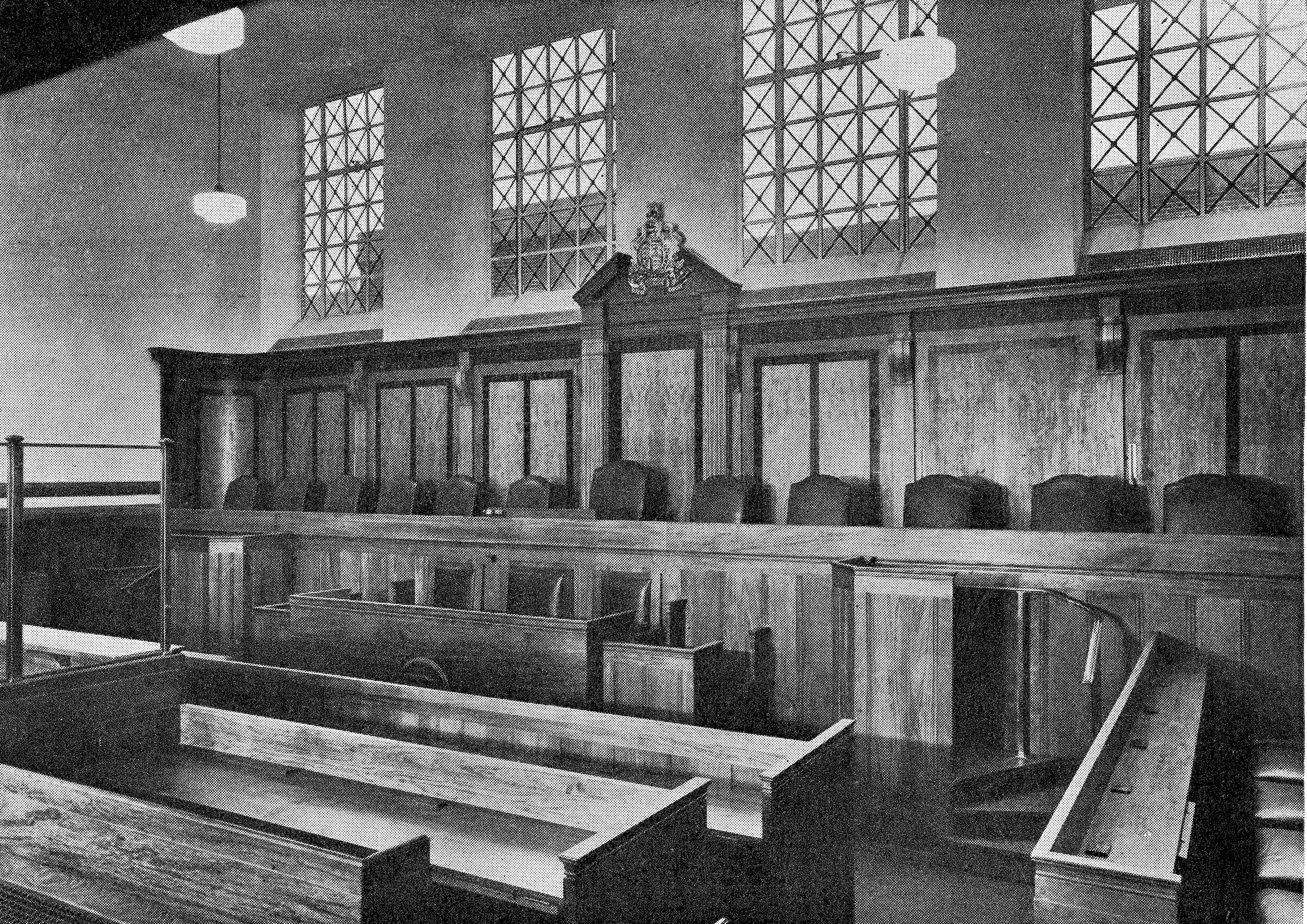

== Resources ==
The sources available include:

- Kelly's and Philipson's street directories for Kingston and District (including New Malden and Surbiton), from 1860s to 1971.
- Electoral Registers for the Royal Borough of Kingston upon Thames, 1920 to present
- Ordnance Survey Maps, Goad Plans and historic maps of Kingston and wider Surrey
- Topographic photographs, prints and artwork
- Surrey Comet Newspaper Archive on microfilm and paper format, 1854 to present
- Local History Books including those by contemporary local historians: Shaan Butters, Tim Everson, Richard Holmes, June Sampson, Julian McCarthy, Mark Davison and Patricia Ward.
- Archive sources including: Kingston Borough's collection of royal charters (dated from 1208); rate and minute books; records of local societies; some public records from Kingston Hospital and Magistrate's Court. The National Archives Discovery catalogue is the search provider for the Kingston History Centre's collections.
- A small collection of films relating to the borough and to Eadweard Muybridge

== See also ==
- Kingston Museum
