= Tilly Smith =

British lifesaver (born 1994)

- Born: 1994 (age 31–32)
- Education: Danes Hill School, Stowe School
- Known for: Saving approximately 100 beachgoers at Mai Khao Beach, Thailand from the 2004 Indian Ocean tsunami
- Awards: Thomas Gray Special Award, Minor planet 20002 Tillysmith named in her honor, "Child of the Year" by Mon Quotidien

Tilly Smith (born 1994) is a British woman who, as a child, was credited with saving the lives of approximately 100 beachgoers at Mai Khao Beach in Phuket, Thailand, by warning them minutes before the arrival of the tsunami caused by the 2004 Indian Ocean earthquake. Smith, who was ten years old at the time, had learned about tsunamis in her geography class.

== Background ==
Smith was educated at Danes Hill School, an independent school in the village of Oxshott in Surrey, followed by Stowe School, a boarding independent school in the civil parish of Stowe in Buckinghamshire.

Smith learned about tsunamis in a geography lesson, two weeks before the tsunami, from her teacher Andrew Kearney at Danes Hill School. Specifically, Smith recalled watching black-and-white footage in class of the tsunami resulting from the 1946 Aleutian Islands earthquake and being taught by Kearney for the warning signs to look out for, especially the frothing nature of the sea. Smith said, "It was the exact same froth... like you get on a beer. It was sort of sizzling," she told the United Nations Office for Disaster Risk Reduction. While she and her family were walking on Mai Khao Beach, she recognised the signs of a tsunami she had been taught, and she alerted her parents. Smith recalled, "It wasn't calm and it wasn't going in and then out. It was just coming in and in and in."

Initially, not seeing any obvious sign of a large wave on the horizon, her parents didn't believe her assertion that a tsunami was coming, but Smith persisted, recalling in an interview that she said curtly: "I'm going. I'm definitely going. There is definitely going to be a tsunami". Her father, Colin, sensing the urgency in his daughter's voice, heeded Tilly's warning. He managed to convince a security guard that a tsunami was inbound: "Look, you probably think I'm absolutely bonkers, but my daughter's completely convinced there's gonna be a tsunami." The beach was evacuated to the second storey of a nearby hotel before the 9-metre (30 ft) tsunami reached the shore.

By then, local security personnel in Mai Khao had already told everyone to leave the beach immediately. Ultimately, Mai Khao Beach was one of the few beaches on the island with no reported fatalities, with only a few minor injuries recorded. Colin added, "It was later when we sort of went through what happened we thought how lucky we were, 'cause if she hadn't told us, we would have just kept on walking," he said. "I'm convinced we would have died, absolutely convinced."

Smith's family declined requests to be interviewed by commercial and national broadcasters in the immediate aftermath, but Smith appeared at the United Nations in November 2005 and at the first anniversary in Phuket as part of a campaign to highlight the importance of education; she also appeared in an educational video for the United Nations Office for Disaster Risk Reduction.

== Awards and recognition ==
On 9 September 2005, Smith received the Thomas Gray Special Award of The Marine Society & Sea Cadets from the Second Sea Lord, Vice-Admiral Sir James Burnell-Nugent.

Minor planet 20002 Tillysmith has been named after her. In the press, Smith was called Angel of the Beach.

In December 2005, Smith was named "Child of the Year" by the French magazine Mon Quotidien (My Daily, a magazine targeted to young readers).

Smith's story has been incorporated into teaching resources for children about earthquakes, tsunamis and how to stay safe.

The tsunami scene in Godzilla (2014) paid tribute to Tilly by including a young girl warning her father about an impending tsunami because she recognized the change in the ocean.
