= St Wulfran's Church, Ovingdean =

Church in East Sussex, England

Coordinates: 50.8157°N 0.0775°W

St Wulfran's Church
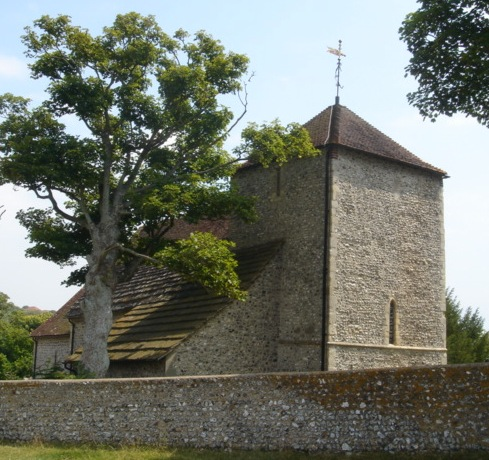
- The church from the northwest
- St Wulfran's Church
- Denomination: Church of England
- Website: www.stwulfrans.org.uk

History
- Dedication: St Wulfran

Administration
- Province: Canterbury
- Diocese: Chichester
- Archdeaconry: Chichester
- Deanery: Rural Deanery of Brighton
- Parish: Ovingdean

Clergy
- Rector: Father Richard Tuset

Listed Building – Grade I
- Official name: Church of St Wulfran
- Designated: 13 October 1952
- Reference no.: 1380550

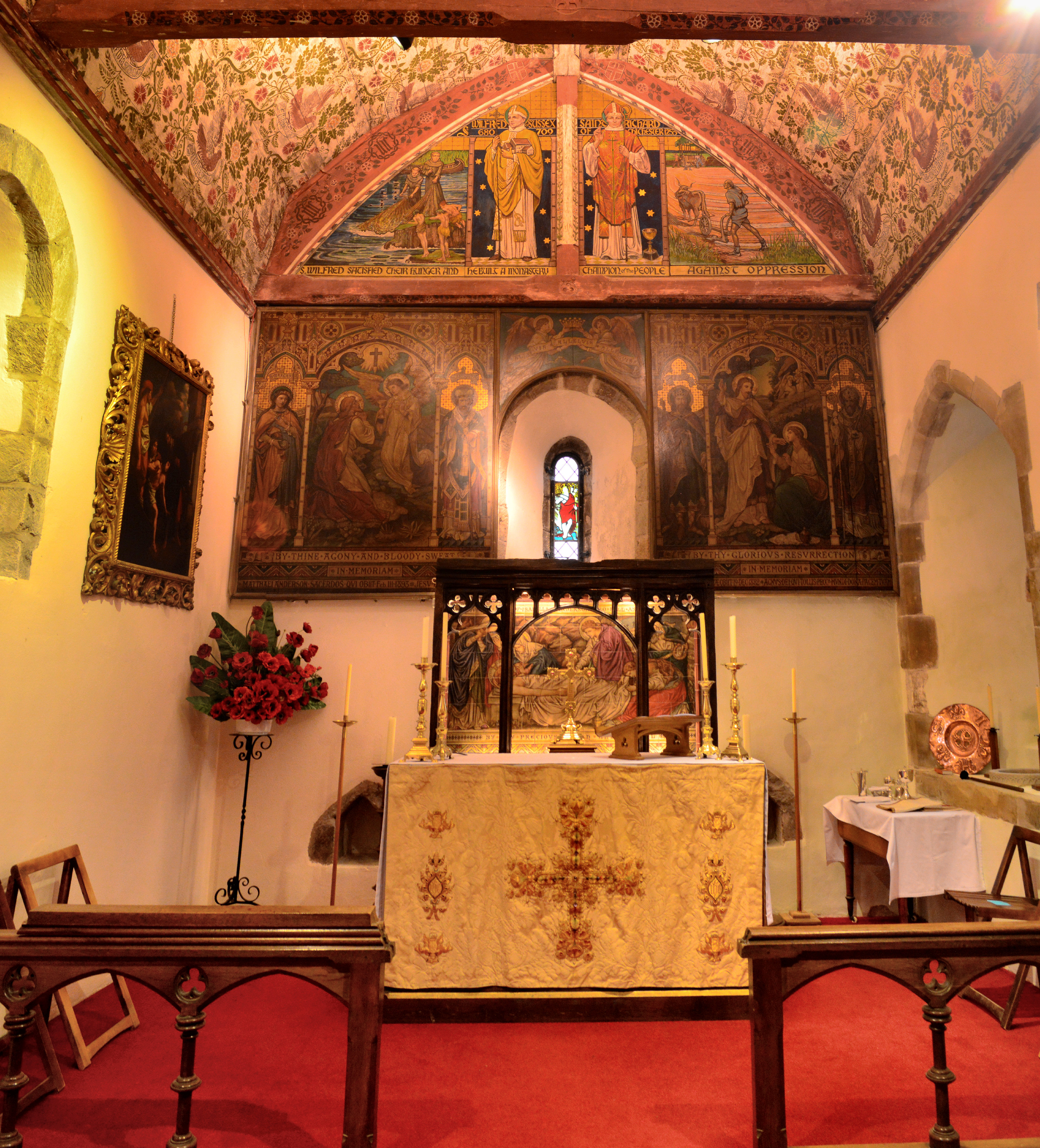
The chancel

St Wulfran's Church, dedicated to the 7th-century French archbishop Wulfram of Sens, is an Anglican church in Ovingdean, a rural village now within the English city of Brighton and Hove. Parts of the structure date from the early 12th century, and the church is listed at Grade I, a designation used for buildings "of outstanding architectural or historic interest".

== History ==
A church existed in Ovingdean at the time of the Domesday Book of 1086, which recorded it as an ecclesiola ("little church"). This was rebuilt in the early 12th century, and most sources agree that no trace of the Saxon-era building remains. The 12th-century chancel and nave form the basis of the present structure. A tower was added at the west end in the 13th century, as was an aisle on the south side (reached by twin archways cut through from the nave). This aisle no longer exists, and its fate is uncertain; however, ancient scorch marks and discoloured brickwork in the south wall of the nave suggest fire damage by the same French raiders who destroyed neighbouring Rottingdean's St Margaret's in 1377. (A stone tablet in the church also makes this claim.)

There were no significant alterations for several centuries after the tower was added, apart from a porch on the south side in the early 19th century, but like many ancient churches in the Brighton area St Wulfran's was subjected to a major restoration in the Victorian era. This took place from 1865 to 1867, and involved the rebuilding of the chancel arches to form one large central arch flanked by two smaller ones, replacement of all the pews, and new panelling and roof timbers in the chancel. These were designed and painted by Charles Eamer Kempe, who had been born in the village and who later became a noted stained glass designer. Before his death in 1907, he provided seven windows for the church; he also designed a rood screen for the chancel, which was carved in the German village of Oberammergau. (The village, famous for its woodcarving tradition, also supplied an intricately carved reredos to St Martin's Church in Brighton's Round Hill district.) There are other painted and stencilled panels from the 19th century throughout the church, representing various Biblical scenes. The reredos was also designed in the late 19th century, and depicts various figures including St Richard of Chichester. The painting over altar depicts St Wilfred and St Richard and was painted 1957-1963 by Maude Emily Bishop (1890-1975).

A chapel was built on the south side in 1907. One had been planned since the 12th-century rebuild, when an archway intended to lead to it was provided in the wall of the chancel. A vestry was added in an architecturally complementary style in the mid-1980s.

The churchyard surrounds the church on three sides, and is home to an ancient yew tree which may be up to 1,000 years old. William Willett, a campaigner for daylight saving time, who is buried at Chislehurst, is commemorated on a family memorial in the churchyard. Brighton-born inventor Magnus Volk—a pioneering electrical engineer who built an early electric car and the Volk's Railway, the world's oldest surviving electric railway is buried in the churchyard. Members of the Kemp(e) family, (Note: Charles was born with the surname Kemp, but added the e later.) including Charles Eamer Kempe himself, are also buried there. Nathaniel Kemp, who built the 18th-century Ovingdean Hall, the main building in the village, and his wife Martha share a tomb on the south side of the church; the tombstone was designed by Charles, who was later buried in the same tomb. The grave of Helena Normanton, the first woman to practise as a barrister in the United Kingdom, can also be found. Resident in Brighton since the age of four, she campaigned for various rights for women, such as advocating the use of maiden names professionally and recommending that women save any spare housekeeping money for their own use. She was also the first benefactor of the nearby University of Sussex. The Jex-Blake family, who lived in Brighton for a time, have a large, ornate tomb in the churchyard, although their most notable member is not buried there. Sophia Jex-Blake is commemorated on the memorial stone, however. She overcame opposition to train as one of the first female doctors in the United Kingdom, helped to found the London and Edinburgh Schools of Medicine for Women, and started a women's and children's hospital in Edinburgh.

The dedication to Wulfram of Sens (in any spelling) is very rare. Only one other extant church in England bears it: the parish church of Grantham in Lincolnshire. A connection between the two may lie with Norman nobleman William de Warenne, one of England's main landowners in the 11th century, who owned land in both Ovingdean and Grantham. Another Lincolnshire church with the same dedication, at Dorrington, is no longer in use.

== Architecture ==
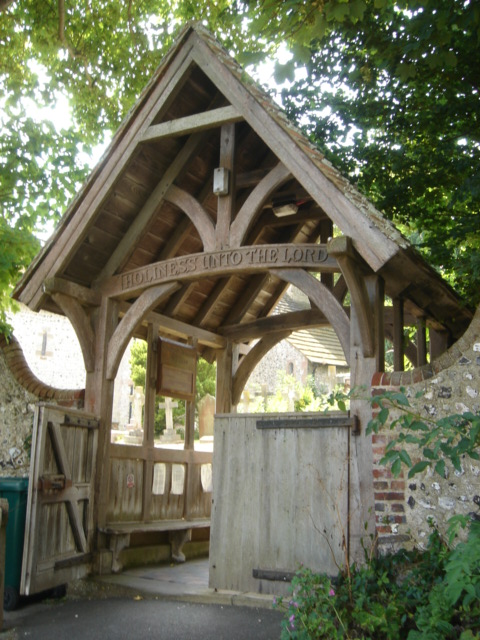
Lychgate at the churchyard entrance

St Wulfran's Church is built entirely of flint, other than narrow stone quoins at the corners of walls. Although churches incorporating some flint are common in Sussex, St Wulfran's is the only all-flint church in the historic county. The roof was originally slate, but tiles have replaced most of the slate slabs. The two-stage tower is topped with a shallow pyramid-shaped spire of a design known as the "Sussex Cap", and has a circular corbel of similar height in its southeastern corner.

There are lancet windows of various sizes on all sides of the church and in the tower. Kempe's stained glass can be found in one of the tower windows, the south chapel, the north wall (three windows) and the south wall (two). Internally, there are several arches, some with pointed tops and chamfering; in particular, there are three arched entrances to the chapel on the south side, and a blocked entrance to the former south aisle.

The churchyard is entered on the east side through a steep-roofed lychgate with recessed seating. "Holiness unto the Lord" is carved on one of the wooden beams.

== The church today ==
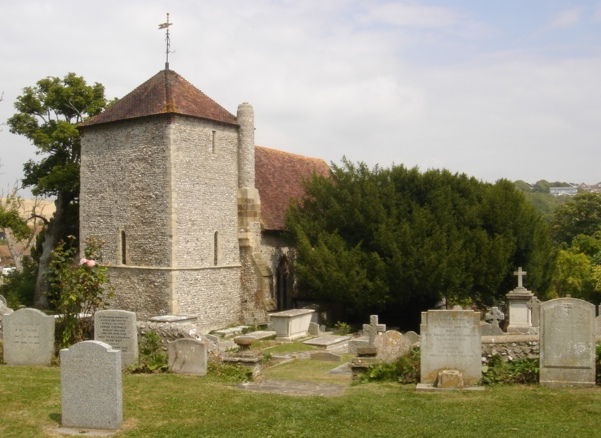
View across the churchyard from the southwest, showing the ancient yew tree by the entrance door

St Wulfran's received its Grade I listing on 13 October 1952. The parish covers a rural area; Ovingdean village is the only significant area of housing. It reaches the southern boundary of Woodingdean, the eastern boundary of the Whitehawk estate and the northern edge of Rottingdean, and incorporates East Brighton Golf Club and surrounding areas of downland.

=== Notable burials ===
The churchyard contains the graves of a number of notable people:

- Mercy Geere (1641–1671), the oldest marked gravestone
- Charles Eamer Kempe (1837–1907)
- Sophia Jex-Blake (1840–1912)
- Magnus Volk (1851–1937)
- Helena Normanton (1882–1957)

== See also ==
- Grade I listed buildings in Brighton and Hove
- List of places of worship in Brighton and Hove

== Bibliography ==
- Carder, Timothy (1990). The Encyclopaedia of Brighton. Lewes: East Sussex County Libraries. ISBN 0-861-47315-9.
- Dale, Antony (1989). Brighton Churches. London: Routledge. ISBN 0-415-00863-8.
- Whiteman, Ken; Whiteman, Joyce (1998). Ancient Churches of Sussex. Seaford: S.B. Publications. ISBN 1-85770-154-2.
