= West End Common =

Nature reserve in Surrey, England

Coordinates: 51.354°N 0.389°W

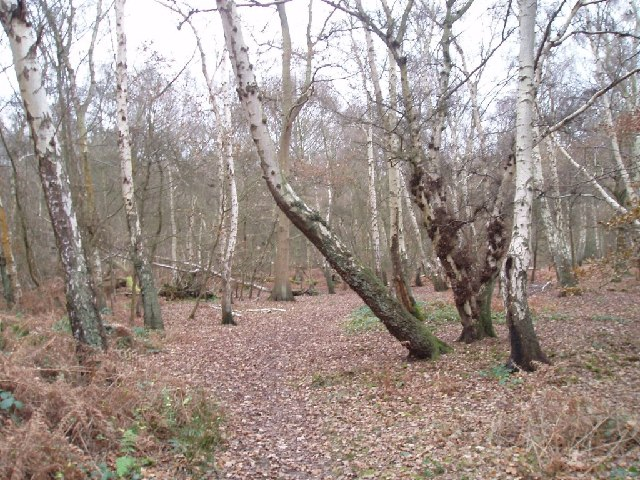
- Interactive map of West End Common
- Type: Local Nature Reserve
- Location: Esher, Surrey
- OS grid: TQ 123 629
- Area: 70.3 hectares (174 acres)
- Manager: Elmbridge Borough Council

West End Common is a 70.3-hectare (174-acre) Local Nature Reserve on the north-western outskirts of Esher in Surrey. It is owned and managed by Elmbridge Borough Council. It is part of Esher Commons, which is a Site of Special Scientific Interest.

The common has wet areas, which have the rare flowering marsh plant starfruit, woodland with ancient oak and beech trees, and grassland. More than 2,000 species of insects have been recorded.

There is access from West End Lane.
