= West End, Esher =

Suburb of Esher, Surrey, England

Coordinates: 51.363°N 0.379°W

West End is a neighbourhood or locality of Esher, Surrey, England centred 0.8 miles (1.3 km) south-west of the town centre.

West End comprises a large green, pick-your-own farm with large garden centre, houses, small number of house conversion-style flats, a pub, a disused school building and chapel, grouped around a large green with a pond. It abuts West End Common, which is part of Esher Commons an outcrop of the Bagshot Formation of a subsoil of sands, peats and gravels, being the part of the Commons nearest the River Mole. The settlement became more than an archetypal hamlet in the mid-19th century with many of the houses dating from the Victorian period. West End is also home to a large garden centre – Garsons Garden Centre. The site also houses a farm shop, a children's playground and a pick your own field, particularly popular in summer. Next to Garsons, there is also a bathtub and swimming pool shop, Poolclean. The chapel has been converted to the West End Village Hall, which is used during school term time as the home of West End Playgroup & Forest School.

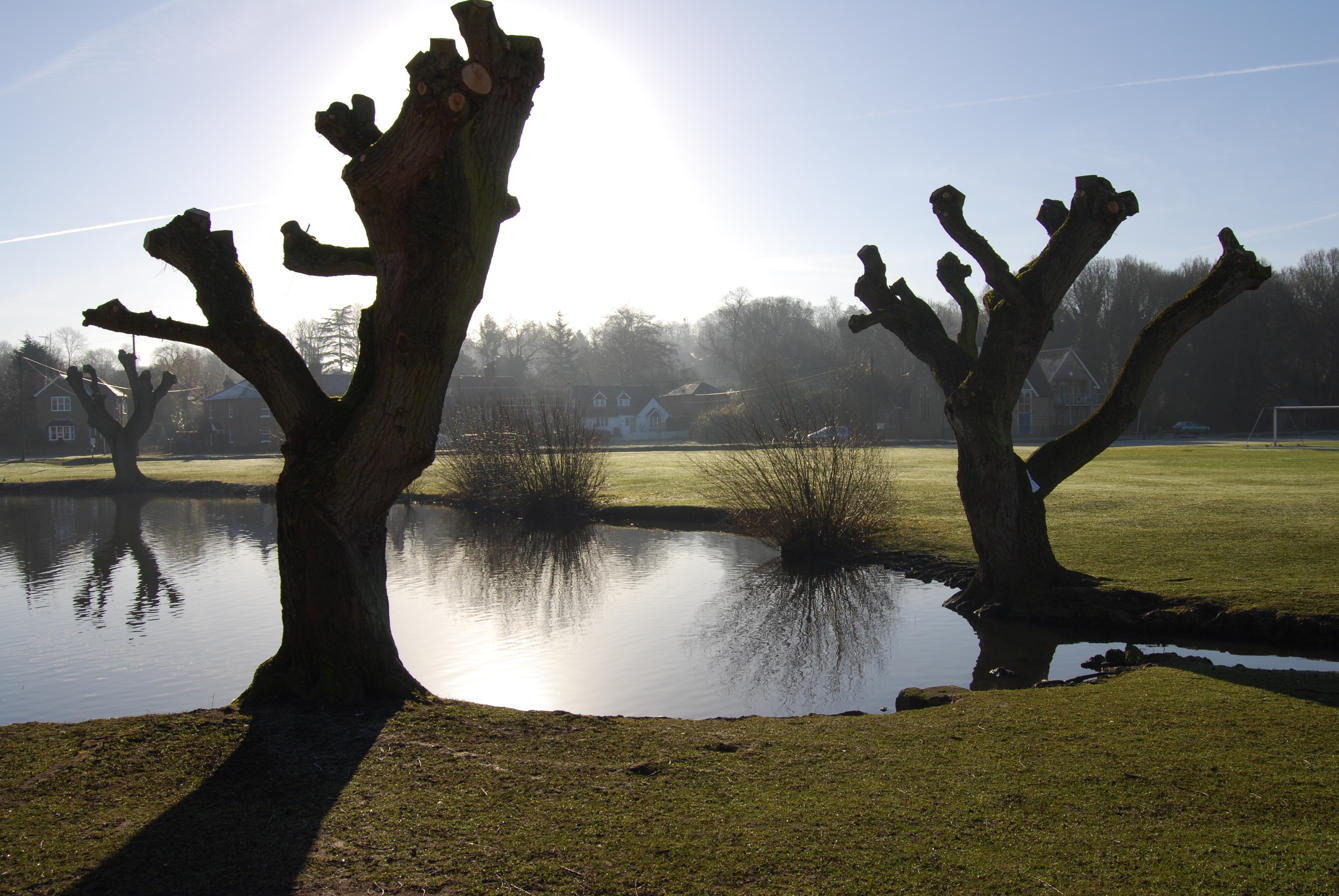
The village pond at West End

West End Esher Summer Show, also known as West End Flower Show, takes place once a year on West End Common. It originated as a Flower Show more than 50 years ago and has developed into an annual show with many events and activities.

There is another West End in Surrey, between Woking and Camberley.
