= Esher Commons =

Several large wooded areas to the south-west of Esher, Surrey, United Kingdom

Coordinates: 51.35040°N 0.36881°W

- Site of Special Scientific Interest
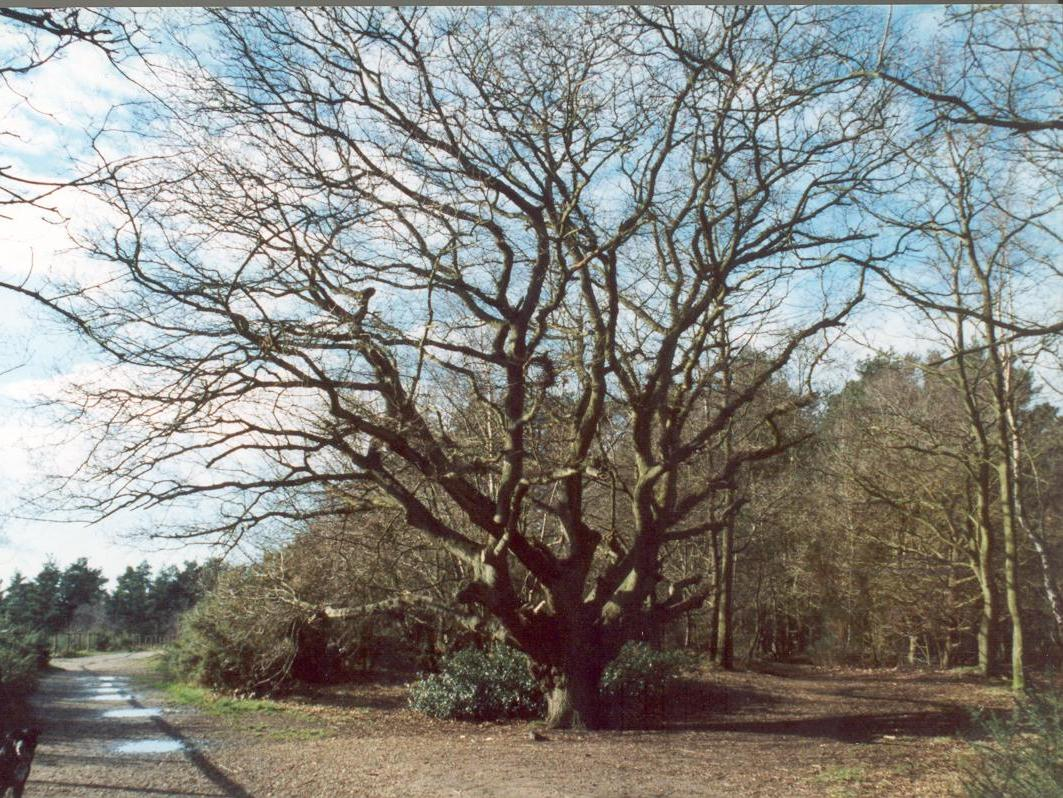
- Oxshott Heath on the escarpment
- Location of Esher Commons.
- Area of search: Surrey
- Grid reference: TQ 132 622
- Interest: Biological
- Area: 360.1 hectares (890 acres)
- Notification date: 1986
- Location map: Magic Map

Esher Commons is a 360.1-hectare (890-acre) biological Site of Special Scientific Interest south-west of Esher in Surrey. It includes Esher Common, Fairmile Common, West End Common and Oxshott Heath. Esher Common and West End Common are Local Nature Reserves.

== Geology and terrain ==
The geology of the Commons consists of the damp clay soils of the Claygate Beds and acidic soils of the Bagshot Beds and Plateau Gravels with peat on top. The terrain is lowland heath, predominantly covered by woodland, including both deciduous and coniferous trees, notably: oak; beech; silver birch; birch; and Scots Pine in various stages of maturity. There is also grassland, and areas of marsh, bog and open water which provide a rich variety of habitats to support many species of plant and animal life. The site is, however, exceptional in the diversity of its fungi. By 2017, about 3400 species had been recorded from this small area, including several new to science, making it the world's most intensively studied place for fungi. Like Slapton Ley, Esher's Commons have been used as evidence to support the contention that fungi are, globally, many times more speciose than plants.

The Common was not always wooded, and much of the area was formerly open heathland used as common grazing land. It had not been grazed for many years and much of the area is now secondary woodland, including conifer plantations from the 1950s. Grazing trials began on a small area of Esher Commons in 2015. In the first year 15 goats were introduced to a 2.5ha area of heath for a period of six months. Esher Commons Site of Special Scientific Interest covers a large part of Arbrook, Esher, Oxshott, West End and Fairmile Commons and the Ledges. Arbrook Common is the easternmost, named after the Arbrook, at other points and sources known as the 'Rythe'. Otherwise much of the remainder of the commons is a subterranean aquifer. A programme to fell tracts of secondary woodland has led to various public protests. In spite of the SSSI designation, the A3 Esher bypass was built through the middle of Esher Common in 1974. As compensation, approximately 90 acres (360,000 m^{2}) of "exchange land" became part of the Commons. The Ledges were added to West End Common, and an area including Middle Pond became part of Esher Common.

== Land ownership ==
All land within Esher Commons SSSI is owned by the local authority. In 1922 the Commons came into public ownership when the Manors of Esher and Milbourne were purchased by the Esher Urban District Council from the Claremont Estate. The Commons subsequently came into the ownership of Elmbridge Borough Council following its formation in 1974.

== Esher Common ==
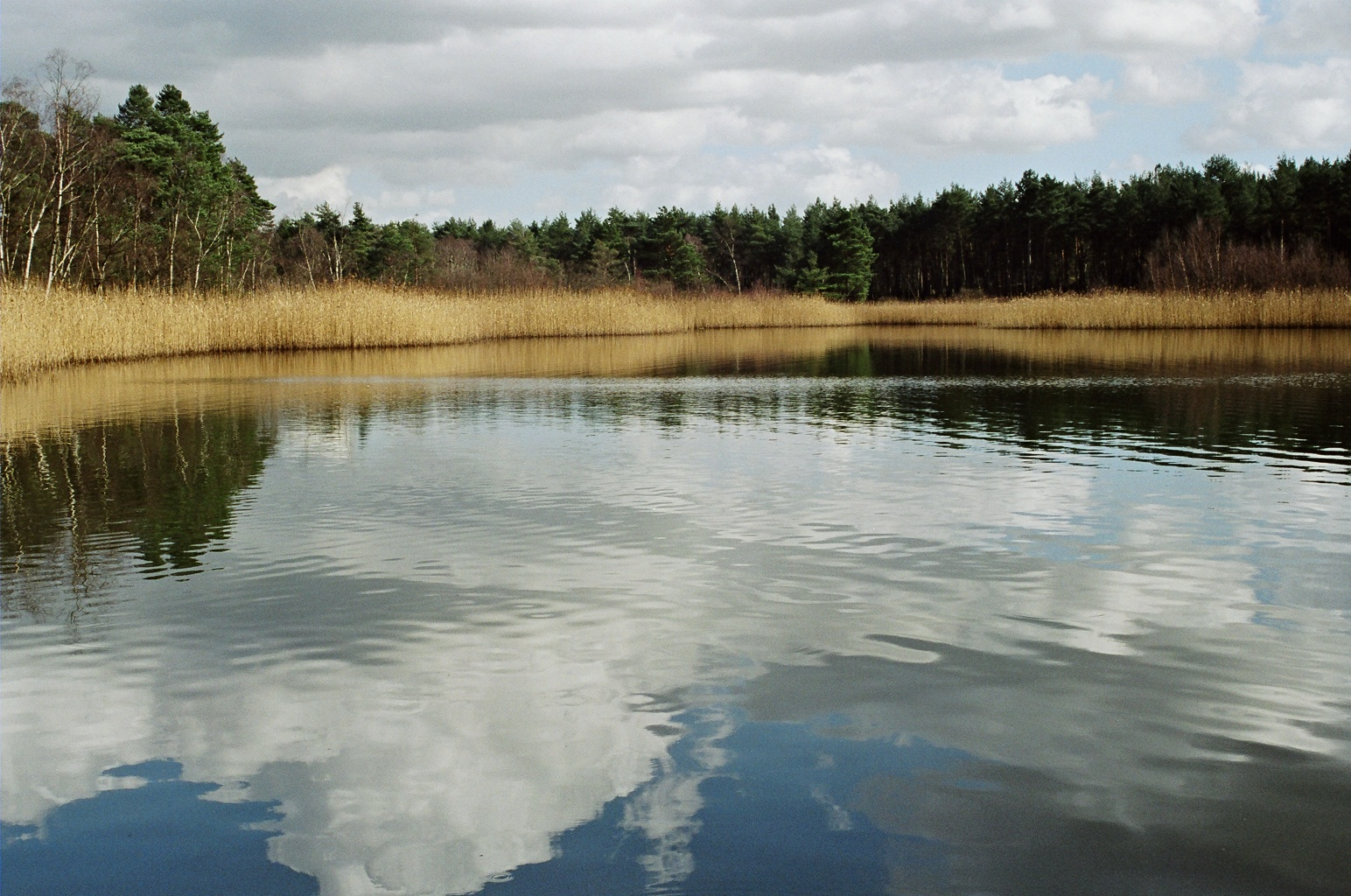
Black Pond

Esher Common is a It contains several ponds and lakes, the largest of which is Black Pond. This was once used as a water supply for the nearby Claremont Landscape Garden now owned and managed by the National Trust. The main piece of high ground is Round Hill, close to Copsem Lane.

There are parking facilities on the A307 (old Portsmouth Road) and the A244 (Copsem Lane).

== West End Common ==
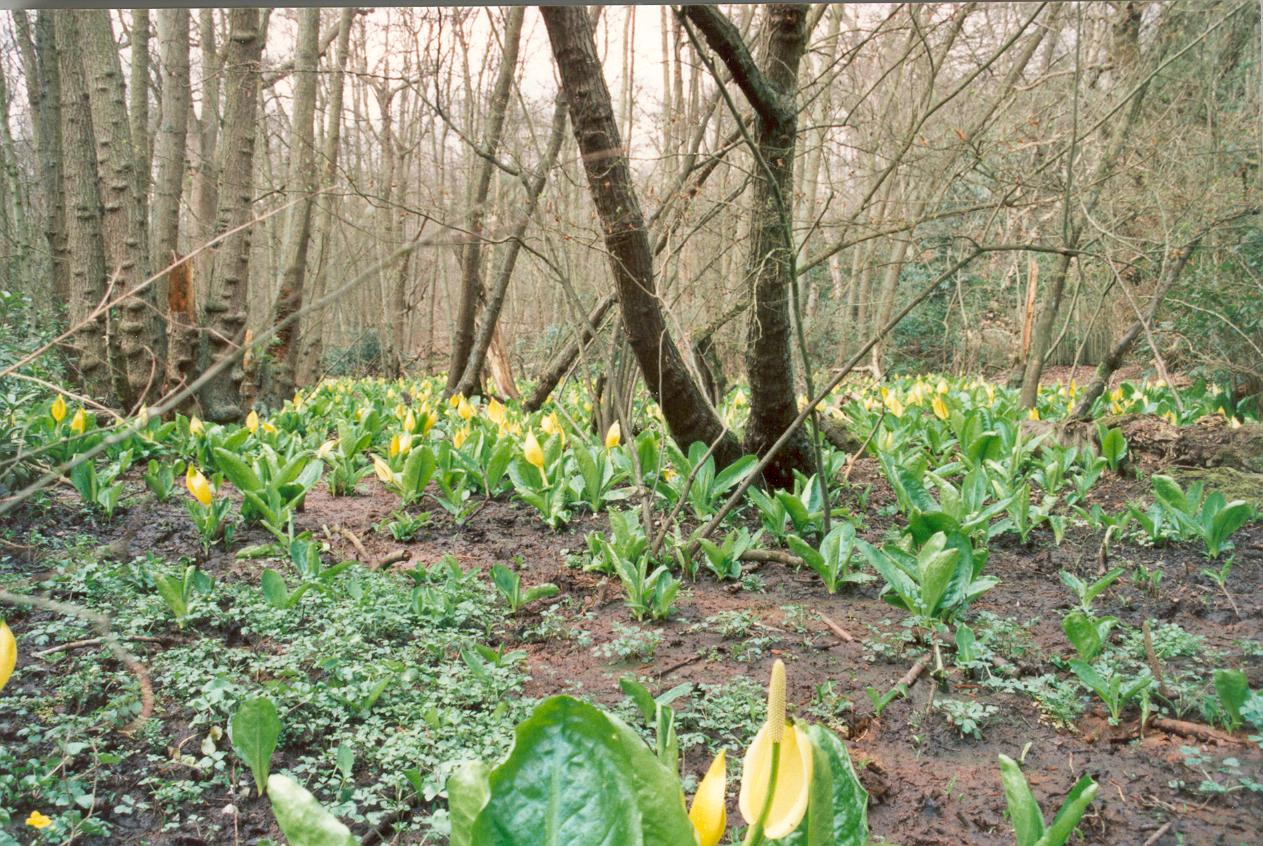
Water plants (Lysichiton americanus) growing near the River Mole

West End Common includes The Ledges, which is a bank of high ground alongside the River Mole.

The common shares the parking facilities on the A307, and can also be accessed from the direction of West End.
