= Oxshott Heath and Woods =

Area in Oxshott, Surrey, England

Coordinates: 51.3388°N 0.3660°W

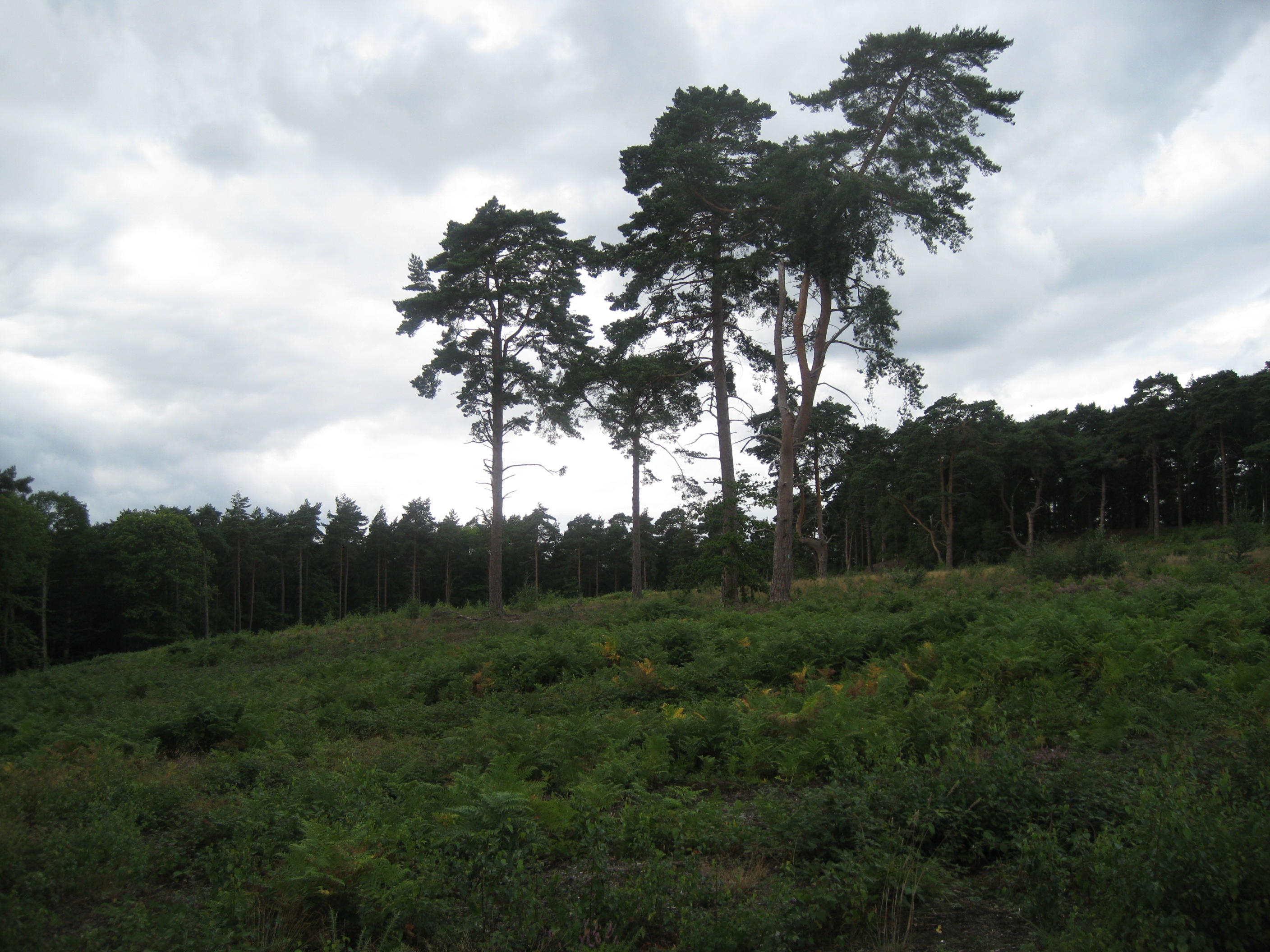
Oxshott Heath and Woods an off-road section

Oxshott Heath and Woods is an area of woods and heathland in Oxshott, Surrey, England covering approximately 200 acres (81 ha), as an area of common land. It is owned by a local authority, however historic rights of access and gathering dead wood where necessary for individual fires are shared and exercised by landowners in the parish of Oxshott which has existed since the end of the 19th century, created from the east of the village of Stoke D'Abernon which in this area was extremely scantly populated until the construction of Oxshott railway station.

== Description ==
This area of 0.81 square kilometres (0.31 sq mi) has a geology simply shaping its topography where the London Clay stratum meets an overlying sand/sandstone stratum and the latter emerges to the surface. The area is centred on a tall outcrop of 'left behind' (uneroded) sand escarpment, from which views to Box Hill (near Dorking) can be made out to the south. Its lightly raised summit has a war memorial. The area is part of Esher Commons in council definitions and terms of habitat and is designated a Site of Special Scientific Interest.

The woodland contains varied patches of deciduous and coniferous trees depending on soil type:

- mature and young oak
- beech
- birch
- silver birch (on relatively dry heath)
- Scots Pine (on relatively dry heath)

It is bordered to the south by the New Guildford Line (the local railway), to the east by the north-south A244 running between Esher and Leatherhead, to the north by the (Portsmouth Road) as aligned since the late 20th century followed by a wooded area that continues north towards Esher as Esher Commons, and the west by a large cluster of residential development of Oxshott itself. Oxshott Woods provide a healthy recreational area for visitors, set on a sloping escarpment with almost flat and more challenging walks.

Unlike the neighbouring Esher Commons proper, Oxshott Heath is managed by a board of conservators originally established by a provisional order made under the Commons Act 1876, and confirmed by a 1904 Order. and the award made under the order.

A common land status applies as to access and rights to domestic (own use) firewood for particular households and subject not to misuse and it is owned by the local authority.

In 1935 a circular Anglo-Saxon bronze brooch of the early tenth century was found, deposited in the British Museum where it is an exhibited collection piece. It is believed to be manufactured in England and has very fine detailing of snakes carved into it.

In 2007 prospective major tree felling was scaled back.
