= Oxshott =

Village and parish in Surrey, England

Coordinates: 51.332°N 0.356°W

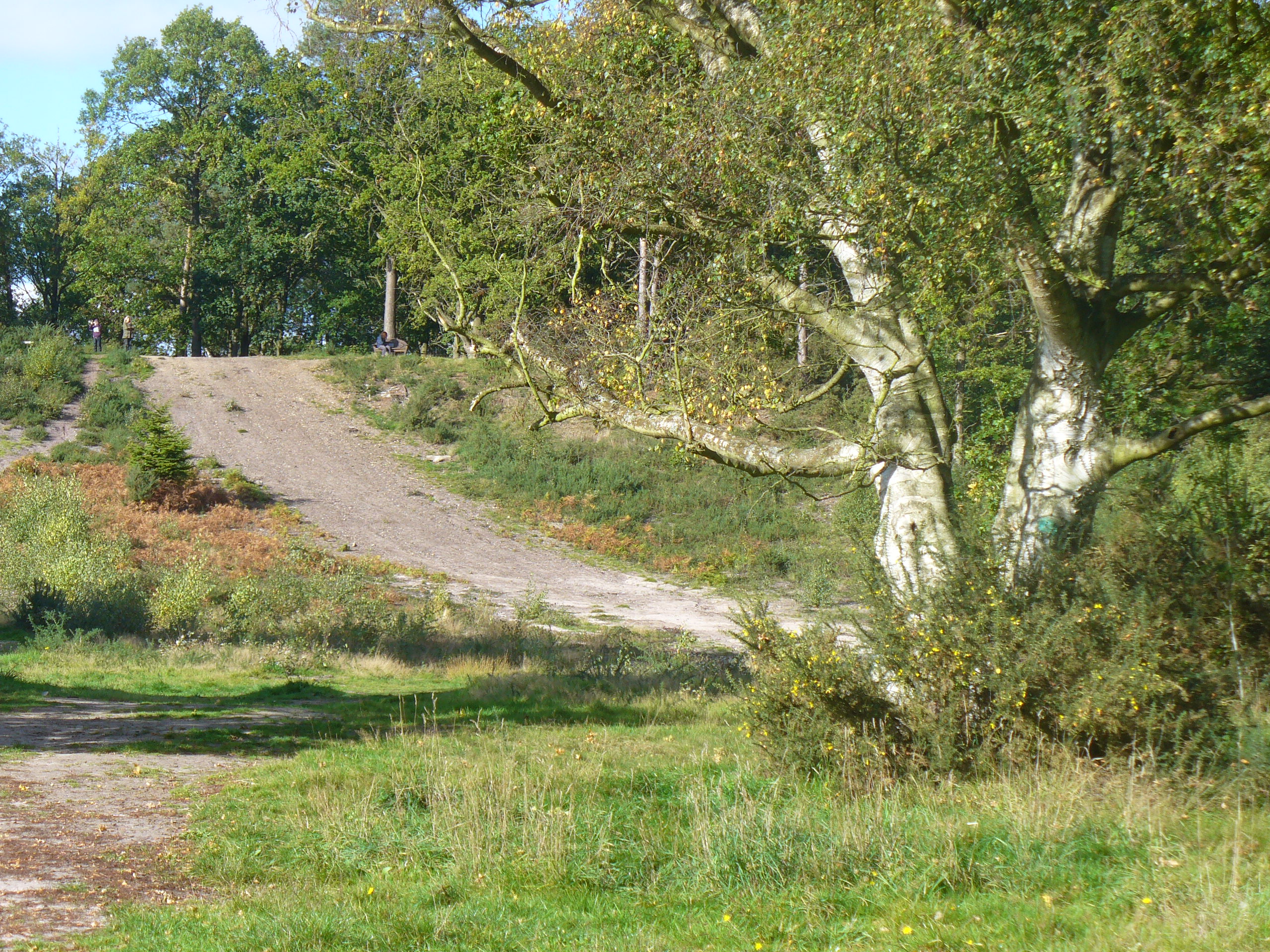
- Oxshott Heath

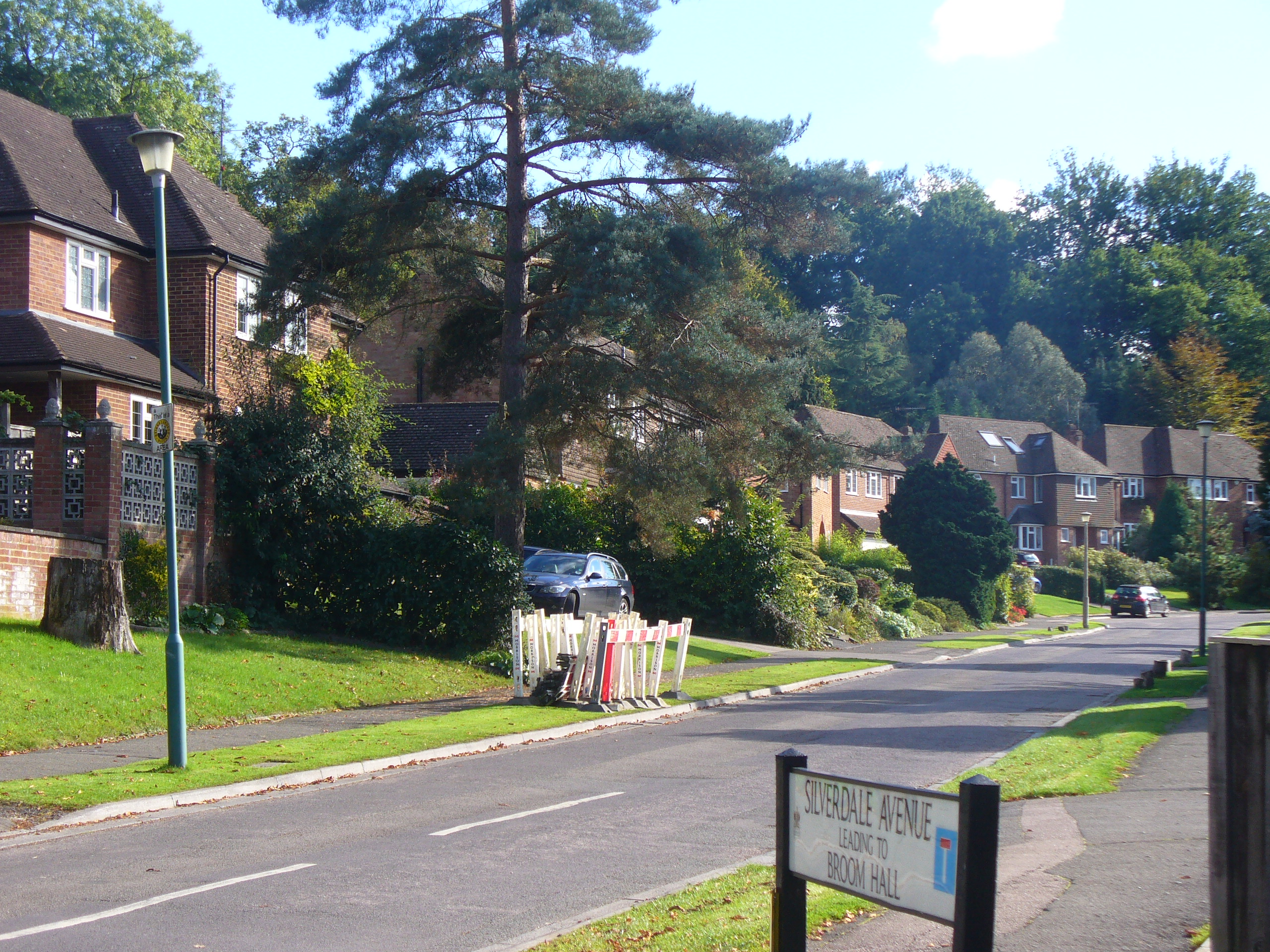
- Silverdale Avenue

- Location within Surrey
- Area: 9.99 km^{2} (3.86 sq mi)
- Population: 4,922 (2011 census)
  - Density: 493/km^{2} (1,280/sq mi)
- OS grid reference: TQ1460
- Civil parish: n/a
- District: Elmbridge
- Shire county: Surrey
- Region: South East
- Country: England
- Sovereign state: United Kingdom
- Post town: Leatherhead
- Postcode district: KT22
- Dialling code: 01372
- Police: Surrey
- Fire: Surrey
- Ambulance: South East Coast
- UK Parliament: Runnymede and Weybridge

Oxshott is a suburban village in the borough of Elmbridge in Surrey, England. Oxshott includes hilly acidic heath which is partly wooded (see Esher Commons and Prince's Coverts) and occupies the land between the large towns of Esher and Leatherhead. The Oxshott section of the single carriageway north-south A244 runs through its middle and briefly forms its high street, centred two miles (three kilometres) from the A3 (Portsmouth Road) and the M25 (London Orbital motorway).

Before about 1912, there was an equally-used alternative spelling, Ockshot. Oxshott was part of Stoke D'Abernon parish until 1912, when Oxshott gained its first place of worship. The Prince's Coverts remains part of the Crown Estate, albeit decreased by some privatisation; and the public land of the village has been protected by inclusion in the Metropolitan Green Belt.

A great many of Oxshott's residential areas are on gated private roads. This, combined with the large and desirable properties that form much of the village's housing stock, contributes to Oxshott's status as the "most expensive village in England".

== History ==
=== Early history ===
Oxshott means "Ocga's corner of land", from the Old English personal name Ocga and sceat (related to modern 'shoot') "corner of land". The first element does not, unlike Oxford, have anything to do with oxen.

Oxshott was first recorded in 1179 as Occesete. At this time Oxshott was a hamlet in the east of the village of Stoke D'Abernon. It had a population of about 200 people living from the land, rather than trade, via forestry, farming and the keeping of pigs.

Until the 16th century, Oxshott was fairly isolated from other centres of population, surrounded by heath and scrubland and connected to nearby villages only by footpaths. For almost the whole of a further three centuries, no major transport links crossed the parish.

In 1820, the Duchess of Kent laid the foundation stone of the national primary school here, which was enlarged in 1897.

=== Modern history ===
In 1885, Oxshott railway station, first named Oxshott and Fairmile, was opened on the new Guildford Line. The railway transformed Oxshott from "a hamlet of pig farmers" into a popular destination for London commuters, who occupied newly constructed mock Tudor mansions on land that had been released by the Crown Estate. A small high street also developed to service their needs.

The religious needs of the growing population were met by the consecration of St. Andrew's Church in 1912, in the Church of England. Oxshott became a parish in its own right in 1913 under that name; this putting an end to the use of the pre-1913 spelling of Ockshot, as used, for example, in 1911 in its topographical description in the Victoria County History. The high street expanded from what were once just three shops: a drapers, a tobacconists and a set of tea-rooms. Industry arrived in Oxshott when John Early Cook set up his brickworks from the local deep patch of suitable clay, in 1866. Production continued until 1958, and the works' distinctive chimney was demolished in 1967. Heathfield Pond is the site of the brickwork pit; it was previously called Brick Pond. The pond is about 100 ft (30 metres) deep with a cottage and machinery at the bottom.

From 1920 until 1978, the Oxshott Pottery, founded by Henry & Denise Wren, was based at Potters Croft in Oakshade Road, Oxshott.

== Transport ==
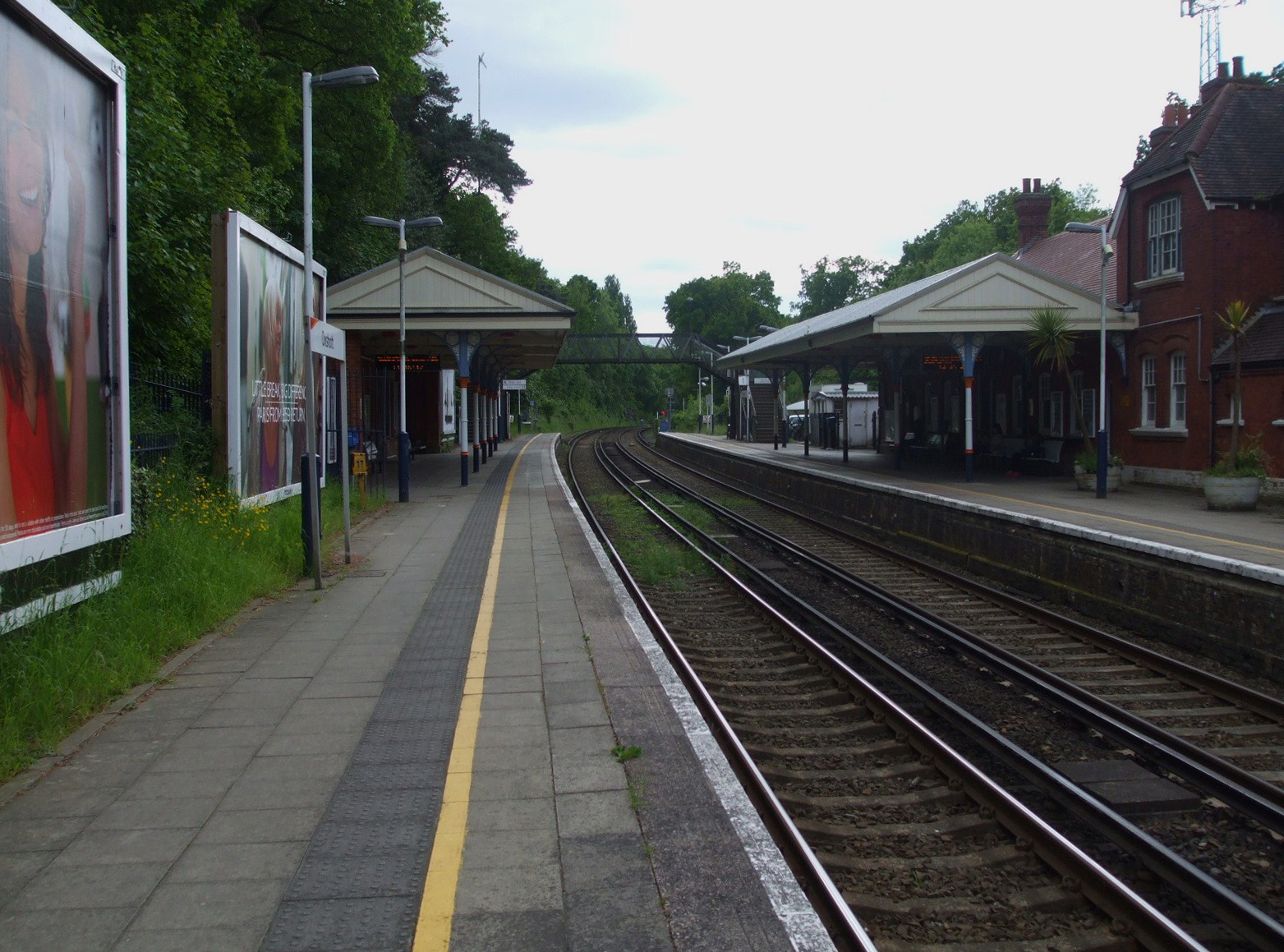
Oxshott station

Oxshott is served by commuter trains, with services taking (best time) 38 minutes to Waterloo station calling at Vauxhall for interchange with the Victoria line, with local bus services also available. Oxshott railway station is just off Oxshott Heath, to the south of Oxshott Woods. Oxshott Heath, geologically, has an escarpment where the London clay and sand strata are raised substantially. For this reason, Oxshott had a brickworks from 1866 to 1958. The brickworks was served by a branch line that ran West from the station (towards Guildford). This is why the footbridge at the end of Sheath's Lane (this is the proper, historic spelling) can span three tracks.

At Cook's Crossing (named after John Early Cook, the owner of the brickyards), the railway crossing had three lines: two for the electrified main line to Guildford via Cobham and Stoke D'Abernon and a single track to the brickyards. This latter track can still be seen if one looks hard, and the old hand-operated gates were removed in the first years of the 21st century. The single track now disappears into the houses built on the brickyards on Somerville Road.

Many people have signed petitions for Oxshott to have a proper bus route. The current connections in the village are: the 408 every two hours, connecting to Leatherhead, Ashtead, and Epsom in one direction, and to Cobham in the other; the 513 to/from Kingston upon Thames three times a day; and the Chatterbus to/from Cobham five times a day.

=== 2010 Oxshott train accident ===
On Friday 5 November 2010, at 15:40, there was an accident where the Guildford via Cobham railway line passes in a deep cutting under the Esher to Leatherhead road. A 26-tonne concrete mixer lorry crashed through the road bridge's parapet and fell about 30 feet (10 metres) onto the railway line, colliding with a train travelling from Guildford to London Waterloo. Of the 40 people on board the train, four were injured. The lorry driver of the lorry was badly injured, and had to be carefully taken out of the cab by the medical services. Rail and road had been cleared and re-opened by early the following Monday.

== Amenities ==
Oxshott has one, Anglican, church, St. Andrew's. Oxshott has its own primary school, the Royal Kent, named because its predecessor was founded by the Duchess of Kent, Queen Victoria's mother, in 1820. Oxshott has an independent preparatory school, Danes Hill School, and its pre-prep school, Bevendean.

The 2012 Summer Olympics cycling road race events passed through Oxshott.

Oxshott has a youth football club, Oxshott Royals FC, competing in the Epsom & Ewell and Surrey Primary Leagues.

== In film and fiction ==
Oxshott is featured in the popular Shopaholic novels by British author Sophie Kinsella, as the hometown of the series' narrator, Becky Bloomwood.

A greater part of the historic novel "Unter der Asche" (Beneath the ashes) by German author Tom Finnek is set in Oxshott and nearby Cobham. The novel deals with the Great Fire of London 1665–66 and the so-called "Diggers", a nonconformist dissenting group during the English Civil War.

Some scenes from the Monty Python feature film Jabberwocky (1977) were filmed in Oxshott Woods.

In the 1970s ITV situation comedy George and Mildred, Mildred's brother-in-law Humphrey is described as "the offal king of Oxshott".

== Notable residents ==
Oxshott has a high concentration of high-net-worth individuals. The village is in a convenient location, due to its good transport links to London, nearby airports, and the M25 motorway; there is also a variety of private schools to choose from.

The proximity of the Chelsea Football Club training grounds at Stoke D'Abernon is also a factor: a number of professional footballers have settled in Oxshott for this reason.

- Violette Cordery – racing driver and long distance record breaker.
- Didier Drogba – professional footballer who played for Chelsea
- Graeme Le Saux – professional footballer
- David Lloyd – founder of David Lloyd Leisure Clubs
- Colin Montgomerie – professional golfer
- Sir Andy Murray – tennis player
- Jamie Redknapp – Liverpool midfielder
- Tilly Smith – saved nearly a hundred people from the 2004 Indian Ocean earthquake and tsunami at age 10
- Raheem Sterling – professional footballer for Arsenal, on loan from Chelsea, and England
- John Terry – professional footballer for Chelsea, Aston Villa and England
- Chris Wolstenholme – bass player and backing vocalist for alternative rock band Muse

== Demography and housing ==
2011 Census Homes
Output area	Detached	Semi-detached	Terraced	Flats and apartments	Caravans/ temporary/ mobile homes	Shared between households
Centre and north-west (Note: Elmbridge 018D)	468	35	12	11	0	0
East (Note: Elmbridge 018B)	447	24	10	132	0	0
South (Note: Elmbridge 018E)	379	178	50	39	0	0

The average level of accommodation in the region composed of detached houses was 28%, the average that was apartments was 22.6%.

2011 Census Key Statistics
Output area	Population	Households	% Owned outright	% Owned with a loan	Area (hectares)
Centre and north-west	1,530	526	45.8%	39.0%	205
East	1,728	613	52.2%	31.0%	612
South	1,664	646	38.4%	41.0%	182

The proportion of households in the settlement who owned their home outright compares to the regional average of 35.1%. The proportion who owned their home with a loan compares to the regional average of 32.5%. The remaining % is made up of rented dwellings (plus a negligible % of households living rent-free).

== Notes and references ==
Notes
