= Kingston Museum =

Coordinates: 51.4096°N 0.3003°W

Museum of Kingston
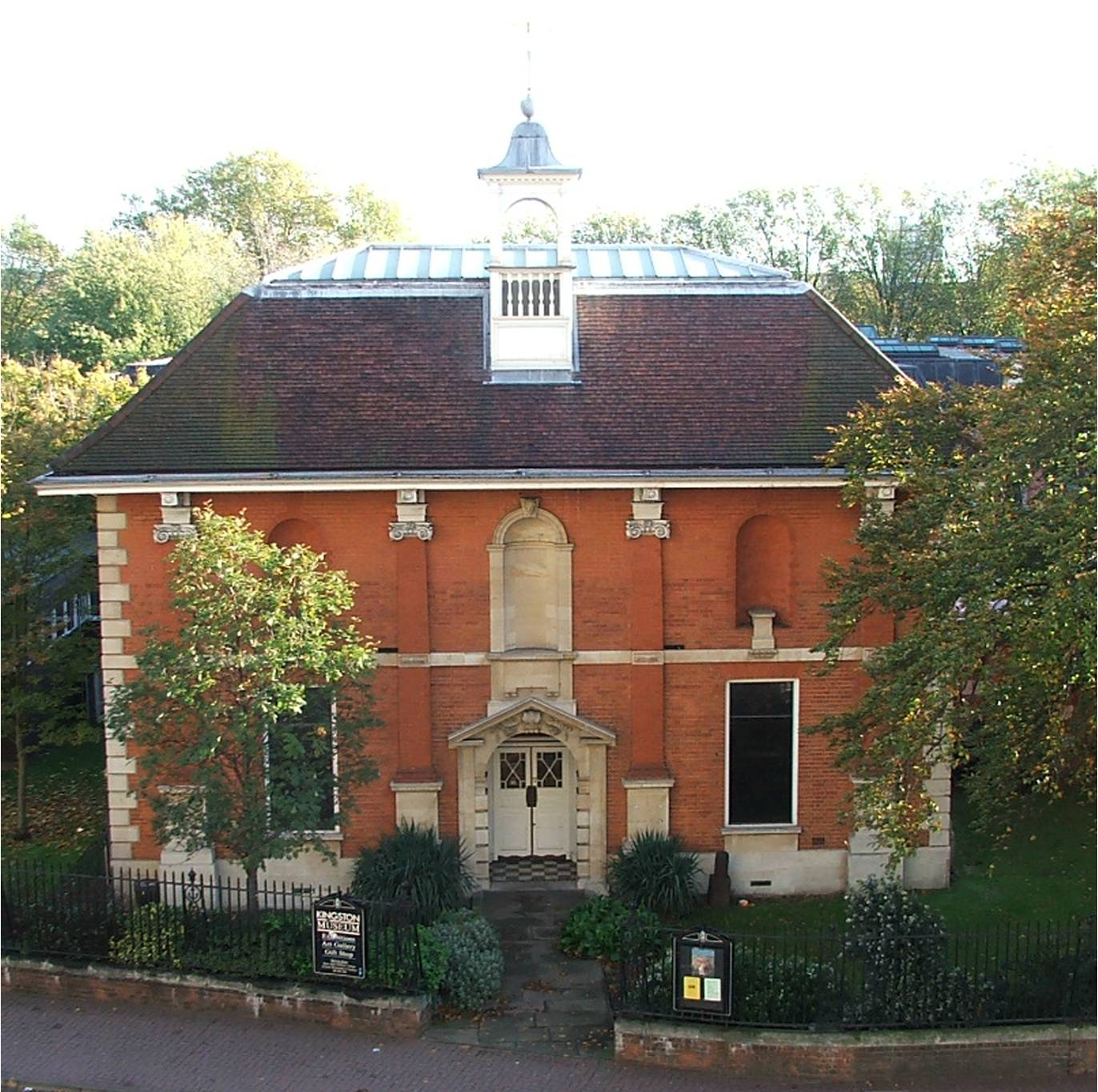
- Location: Wheatfield Way, Kingston upon Thames KT1 2PS, London, England, United Kingdom
- Type: History museum
- Public transit access: Kingston
- Website: www.kingston.gov.uk/museum

Listed Building – Grade II
- Official name: Kingston Public Library, Museum and Art Gallery
- Designated: 17 January 1973
- Reference no.: 1080102

Kingston Museum is an accredited museum (Note: Kingston Museum's unique Accreditation Reference Number is 98, and the museum is included in the database of museums accredited under the Museum Accreditation Scheme.Museum Accreditation Scheme – Arts Council England) in Kingston upon Thames, southwest London, England. The Scottish-American philanthropist Andrew Carnegie funded the building of the museum, which adjoins Kingston Library.

The museum runs a programme of temporary exhibitions and events; entry is free of charge. Built in 1904, the museum has three permanent exhibitions: "Ancient Origins" details the borough's past from prehistory to Anglo-Saxon times; "Town of Kings" charts Kingston's development as a market town from the medieval period until the 1940s; and "Eadweard Muybridge" presents material related to the noted photographer, a native of Kingston.

== Description ==
The museum's holdings include 120 Martinware ceramics, some of which are on display. The Brill Collection comprises over 110 topographical artworks by Kingston University staff and students. This scheme to record the changing landscape of the borough was the brainchild of Reginald Brill, head of the former Kingston School of Art, and ran from 1955 to 1971. The Friends of Kingston Museum relaunched the scheme in 1997, and additions to the collection are made annually and displayed as part of a rolling programme in the art gallery stairwell.

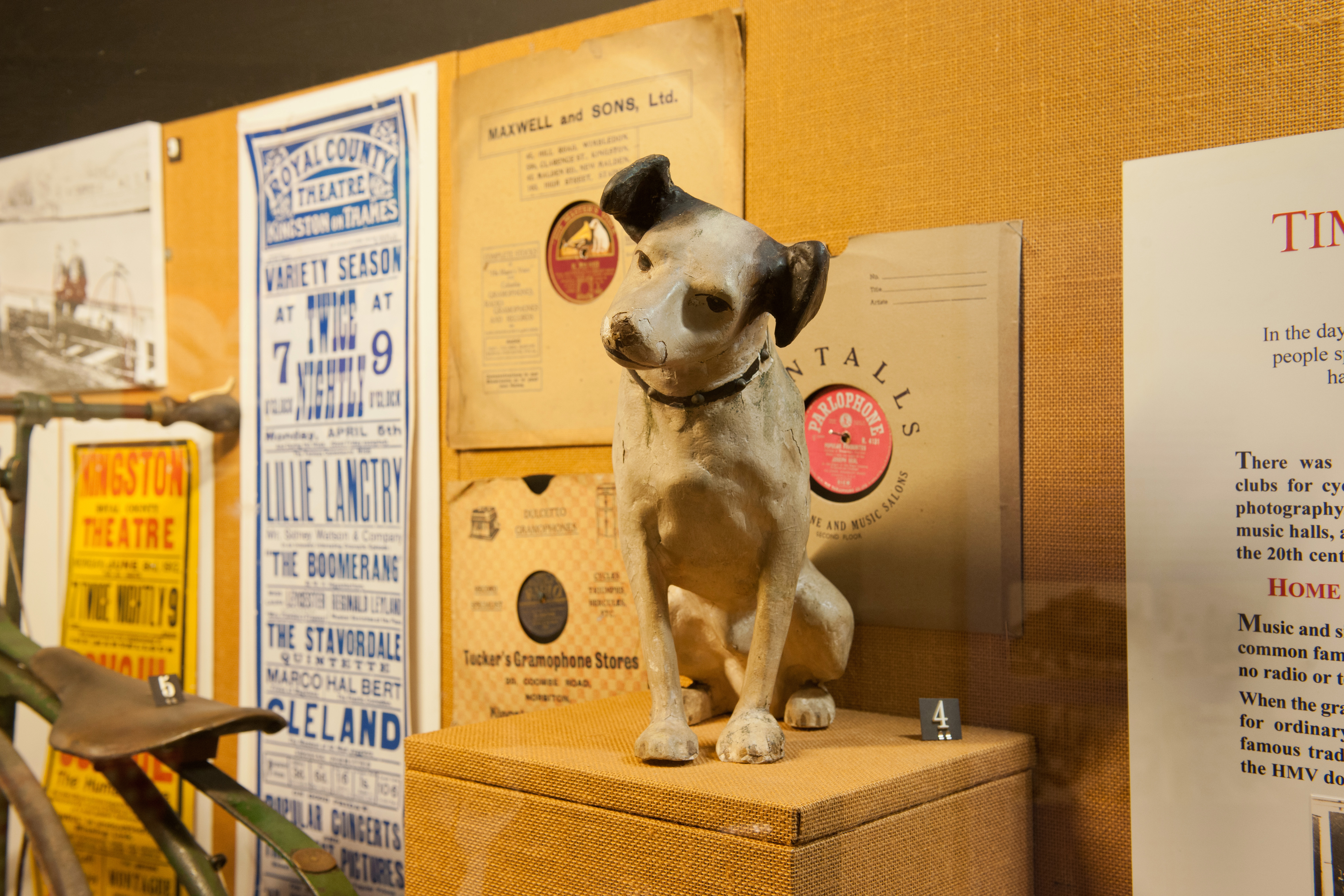
Nipper

Other highlights on display are stained-glass windows from the old Town Hall in the Market Place, a Roman altar with inscription, an Anglo-Saxon skeleton and a model of Nipper, the dog featured in the "His Master's Voice" logo, who was buried under what is now Kingston's Lloyds Bank in 1895.

The museum building is Grade II listed, jointly with the neighbouring library and art gallery.

== Eadweard Muybridge gallery ==
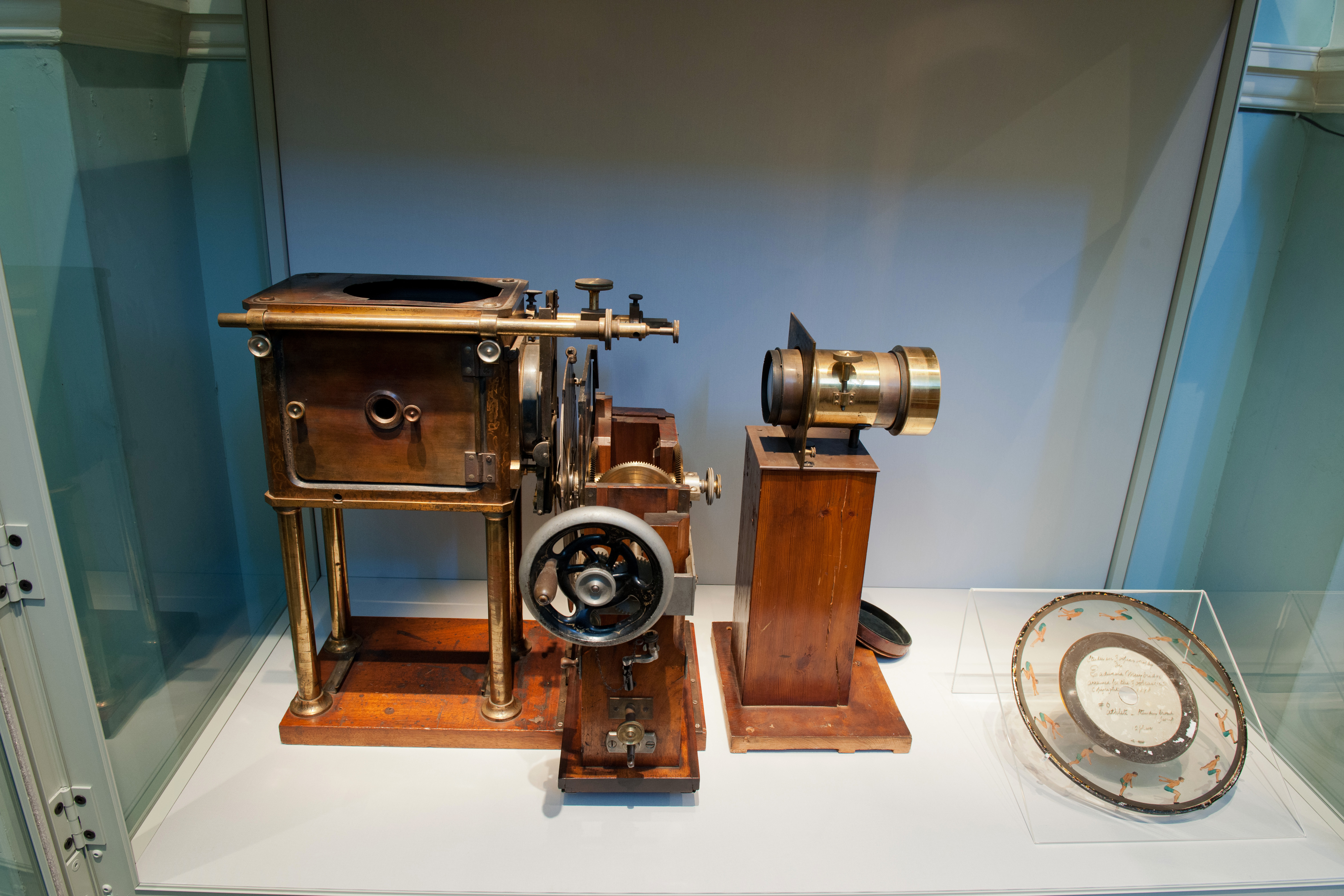
Muybridge's zoopraxiscope and disc

The Eadweard Muybridge gallery is devoted to the pioneering photographer (1830–1904) who was born and died in Kingston. It shows a representative selection of material he bequeathed to the museum, including over 2,000 glass magic lantern slides and 67 glass zoopraxiscope discs, as well as equipment used by Muybridge during public lectures he gave in the US and Europe in the 1880s and 1890s. Muybridge spent his career in America, and there are a number of collections in the US which also hold significant material relating to his work.

"Muybridge Revolutions" was an exhibition of Muybridge's zoopraxiscope discs held at the museum from September 2010 to March 2011. The online portal Eadweard Muybridge: Defining Modernities gives information about Muybridge material in collections worldwide.

== Kingston Art Gallery and Kingston History Centre ==
The art gallery on the first floor of the museum hosts a changing programme of exhibitions as well as talks and events. There is a community case in the front entrance where local groups hold displays. In 2017 the museum recruited its first artist-in-residence, Paul Mowatt, whose photographs and videos were inspired by the work of Muybridge.

Kingston History Centre, the other half of the Heritage Service, is located at Kingston's former Magistrates Court, Kingston upon Thames Guildhall. It houses research materials and archives for investigating local history.
