= List of places of worship in Elmbridge =

Location of British houses of worship

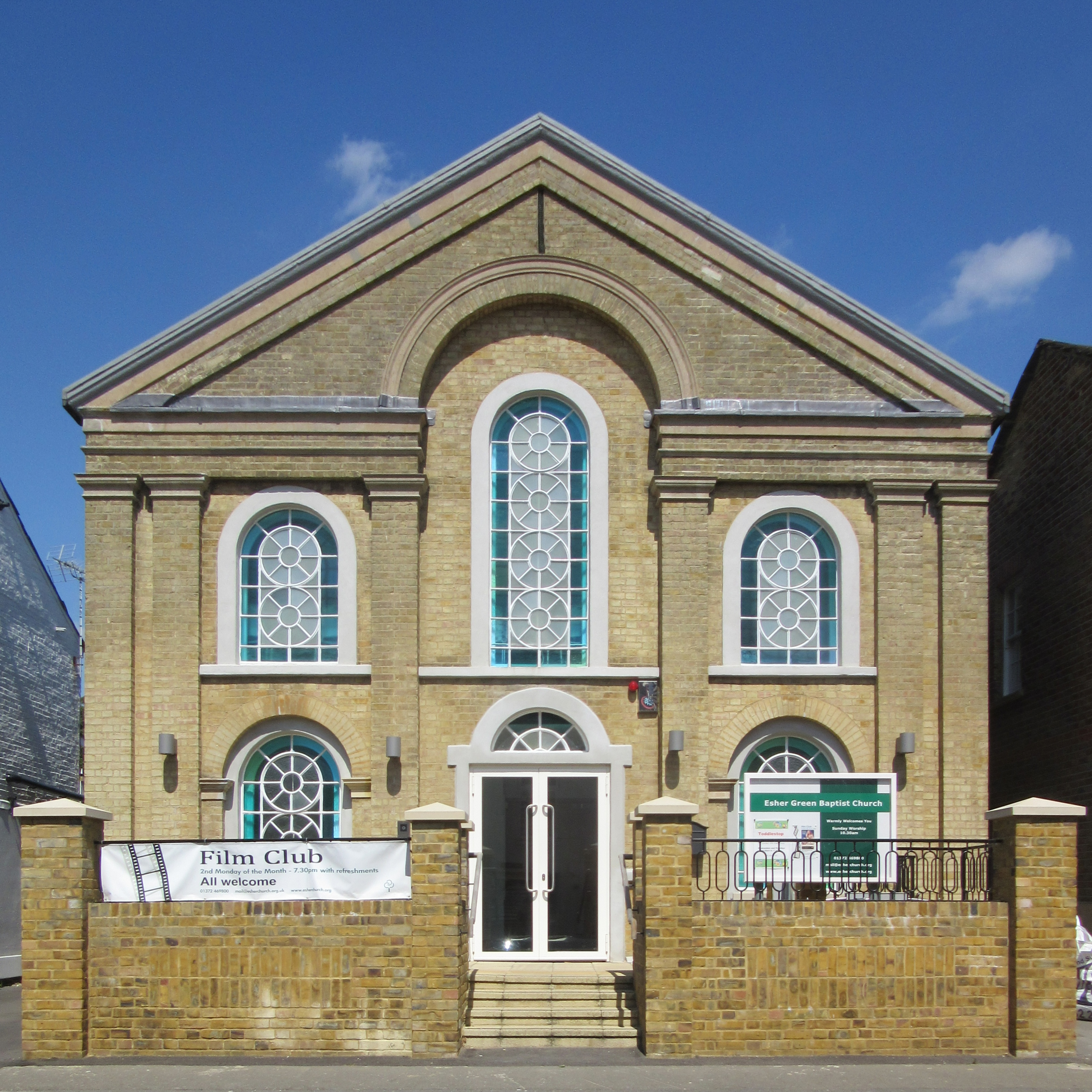
The Baptist chapel in Esher dates from 1869.

There are more than 60 current and former places of worship in the borough of Elmbridge in Surrey, England. Various Christian denominations operate 48 churches, chapels and meeting houses across the borough, and there are two synagogues; a further 12 buildings no longer serve a religious function but survive in alternative uses. Elmbridge is one 11 local government districts in the county of Surrey—a small inland county south of London. The borough is mostly urban, with a series of small towns and villages connected by suburban development. Ancient parish churches survive in several places, but most places of worship were established in the 19th and 20th centuries.

The United Kingdom Census 2011 reported that the majority of residents are Christian. The Church of England, the country's Established Church, is represented by the largest number of church buildings; there are also several Roman Catholic churches; and chapels serving members of the major Protestant Nonconformist denominations such as Methodists, Baptists and the United Reformed Church can be found in towns and villages across the borough. Other denominations and groups represented in the borough include Christian Scientists, The Church of Jesus Christ of Latter-day Saints, Jehovah's Witnesses, the New Apostolic Church, Quakers and Spiritualists. A congregation of Korean Presbyterians meets in the town of Weybridge, and synagogues serve Jews of both the Liberal tradition and the Movement for Reform Judaism.

Historic England has granted listed status to 18 current places of worship in the borough, as well as to one former church. A building is defined as "listed" when it is placed on a statutory register of buildings of "special architectural or historic interest" in accordance with the Planning (Listed Buildings and Conservation Areas) Act 1990. The Department for Digital, Culture, Media and Sport, a Government department, is responsible for this; Historic England, a non-departmental public body, acts as an agency of the department to administer the process and advise the department on relevant issues. There are three grades of listing status. Grade I, the highest, is defined as being of "exceptional interest"; Grade II* is used for "particularly important buildings of more than special interest"; and Grade II, the lowest, is used for buildings of "special interest". As of February 2001, there were 8 Grade I-listed buildings, 20 with Grade II* status and 462 Grade II-listed buildings in the borough. There are also four locally listed churches which have been categorised by Elmbridge Borough Council as being of local architectural or historic interest.

== Overview of the borough and its places of worship ==
Elmbridge borough is in the north of Surrey.

Elmbridge is located in the north of the county of Surrey in southeast England, adjacent to Greater London. Clockwise from the north, it has boundaries with the London Borough of Richmond upon Thames and the Royal Borough of Kingston upon Thames, also in London; and the boroughs and districts of Mole Valley, Guildford, Woking, Runnymede and Spelthorne in Surrey. The largest towns are Walton-on-Thames and its neighbour Weybridge, which in 2001 had populations of 22,834 and 19,463 respectively. West Molesey, Hersham and Cobham each had a population of roughly 12,000 in the same year, while Esher and Thames Ditton each had around 8,000 residents. Smaller settlements, in decreasing order of population, are Claygate, East Molesey, Long Ditton, Hinchley Wood, Oxshott, Stoke d'Abernon and Weston Green. The borough is affluent and has a high standard of living, regularly being named the best place to live in England. Proximity to London, the airports at Gatwick and Heathrow and the M25 motorway, low crime and good-quality schools make it an expensive place to live: it has been described as "Britain's Beverly Hills". The total population in 2011 was just over 130,000.

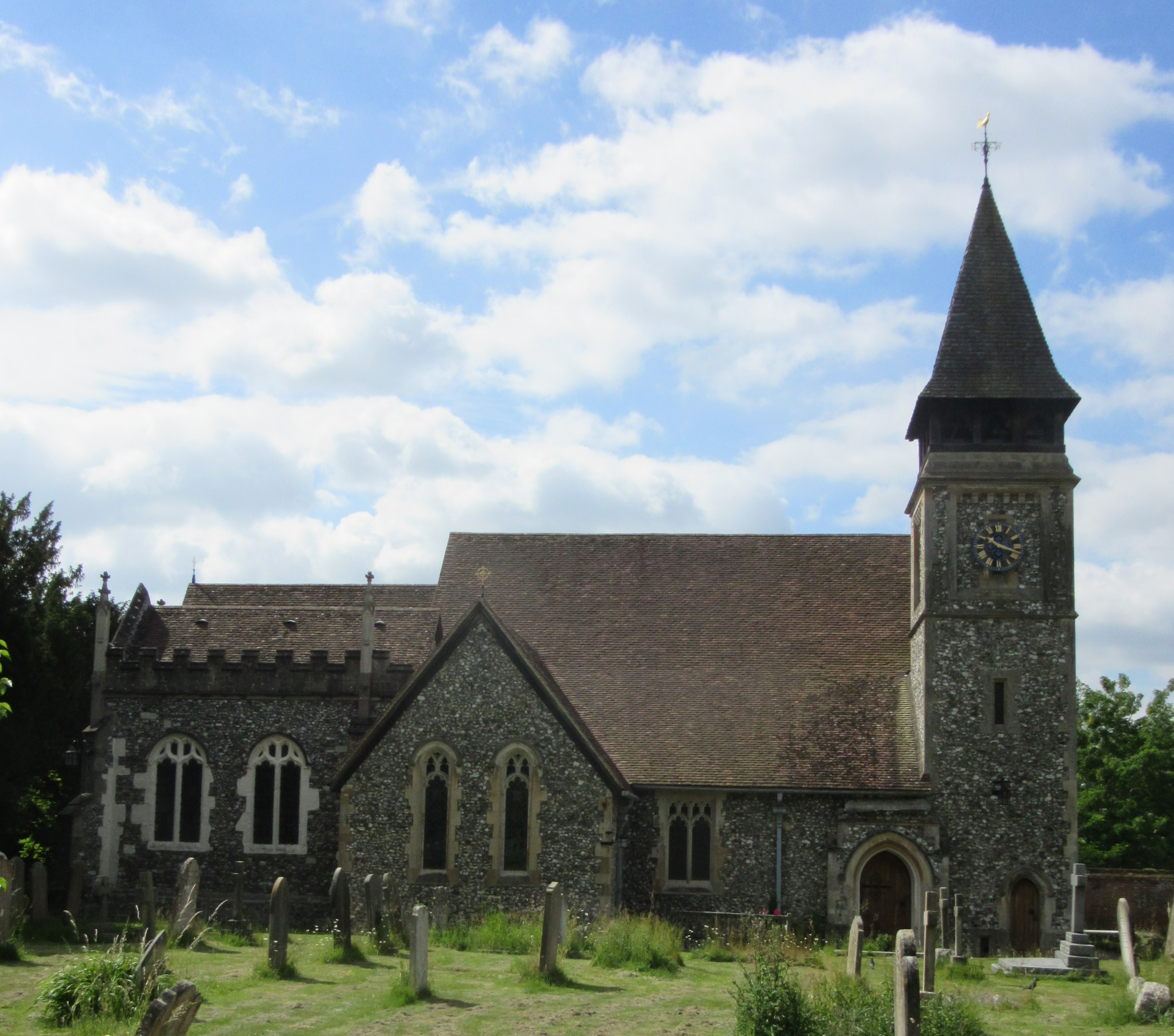
The Anglican church at Stoke d'Abernon has some Saxon fabric.

Cobham, Stoke d'Abernon, Thames Ditton and Walton-on-Thames each have ancient parish churches. At Cobham, St Andrew's Church retains its Norman tower, and much of the other work dates from the 13th, 14th and 15th centuries. Parts of the chancel and nave at St Mary's Church in nearby Stoke d'Abernon are even older, dating from the Saxon period, and Roman brickwork has been reused in the walls. The massive, low tower, chancel and some windows at St Nicholas' Church in Thames Ditton date from the 13th century, and the font is a century older. St Mary's Church at Walton-on-Thames retains some Norman-era fabric, but much of the structure dates from the 14th and 15th centuries. Esher's church, which existed by the late 13th century, was replaced by the "delightful [and] endearing" St George's Church in about 1540.

Many of Elmbridge's Anglican churches date from the Victorian era. The ancient church at Weybridge was replaced by a new building on a different site in the churchyard in 1848. St James's Church was designed by John Loughborough Pearson and was extended in 1864. Similarly, St Mary's Church at Long Ditton replaced a 12th-century church nearby in 1878. St Mary's Church at East Molesey and St Peter's Church in West Molesey were completely rebuilt in 1864–67 and 1843 respectively; the only older feature surviving at either church is the tower of St Peter's, which is 16th-century. Also in the Victorian era, several new Anglican churches were built to cope with the rapid population growth in the area. Holy Trinity Church at Claygate, initially a chapel of ease to Thames Ditton but separately parished within a year, opened in 1840. A year earlier, a church with same dedication was built at Hersham as a chapel of ease to Walton-on-Thames. A parish was formed in 1851, and replacement church (dedicated to St Peter) opened in 1887. Christ Church (1853–54) became the new parish church of Esher, superseding St George's Church. St Paul's Church at East Molesey was built in 1854 and was separated from the parish of St Mary's Church two years later. St Mary's Church at Oatlands opened in 1861 as a chapel of ease in Walton-on-Thames parish; it was allocated its own parish eight years later. Anglican services were held in a school in the village of Oxshott (Note: Known in the 19th and early 20th century as Ockshot.) in Stoke d'Abernon parish during the 19th century. In 1912, a permanent church dedicated to St Andrew was built. Other 20th-century churches opened at Weston Green in 1939, succeeding a mission chapel of 1901, and Hinchley Wood and the southern part of Walton-on-Thames after World War II. A tin tabernacle which was in use by 1911 still serves as a mission chapel in Esher parish; and another mission chapel exists in the hamlet of Downside within the parish of Ockham. (Note: Ockham is in the borough of Guildford.) There is also a church at Whiteley Village, a model village designed for retired people and laid out between 1914 and 1921.

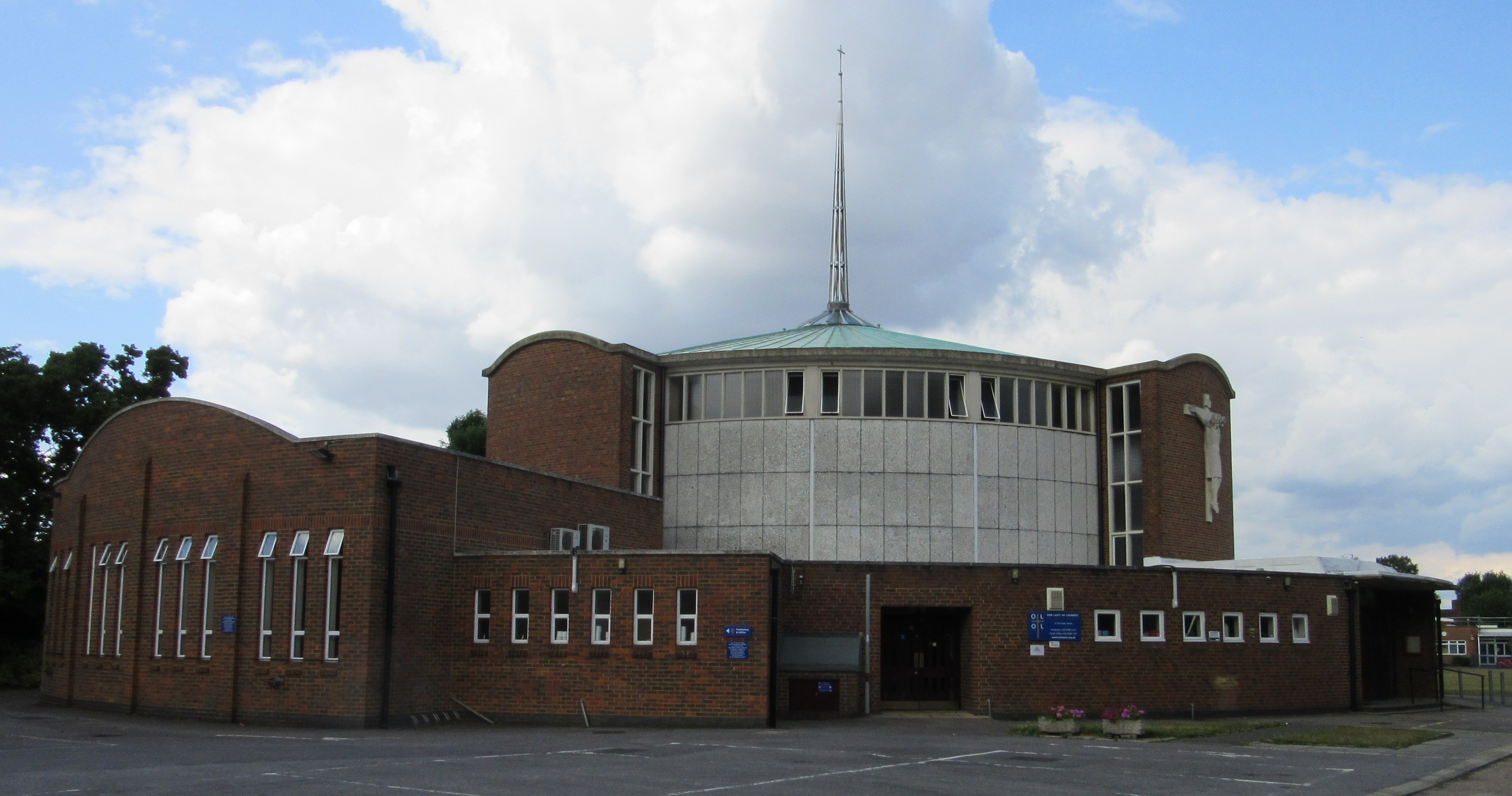
Thames Ditton's Roman Catholic church dates from 1965.

The historic centre for Roman Catholic worship in the area was Woburn Park, a house and country estate between Addlestone and Weybridge. (Note: Situated in the borough of Runnymede. It is now St George's College, Weybridge, a Catholic school run by Josephites.) This was owned by Philip Southcote and included a Catholic chapel served by priests from the Dominican Order, but it closed when the estate was sold to a non-Catholic in 1815. In that year a priest established a new Catholic mission in his own house in Weybridge. In 1836 a Catholic landowner and architect, James Taylor, built a new chapel on his land; this tiny building later became the sacristy of a new, much larger church dedicated to St Charles Borromeo and opened in 1881. The church at Surbiton (Note: Now in Greater London.) then founded two missions in present-day Elmbridge in 1905. A church was built that year and opened in 1906 in Walton-on-Thames; the present St Erconwald's Church succeeded it in 1937. At West Molesey, a house was converted into a mission chapel and opened in September 1905; it was succeeded by a tin tabernacle and then by the present St Barnabas' Church, built in 1931. More churches were built after World War II: in Cobham (1958), Hersham (1960), Claygate (1960–61) and Thames Ditton (1965). An increase in the Catholic population of Weybridge also led to a disused cinema being converted into a second church. Both this, dedicated to St Martin de Porres, and St Charles Borromeo remained open until 1988; money from the sale of both buildings was put towards a new church and parish centre on a different site. The Church of Christ Prince of Peace opened in 1989. St Charles Borromeo Church became a Korean Presbyterian church, while St Martin de Porres Church was demolished and replaced with offices.

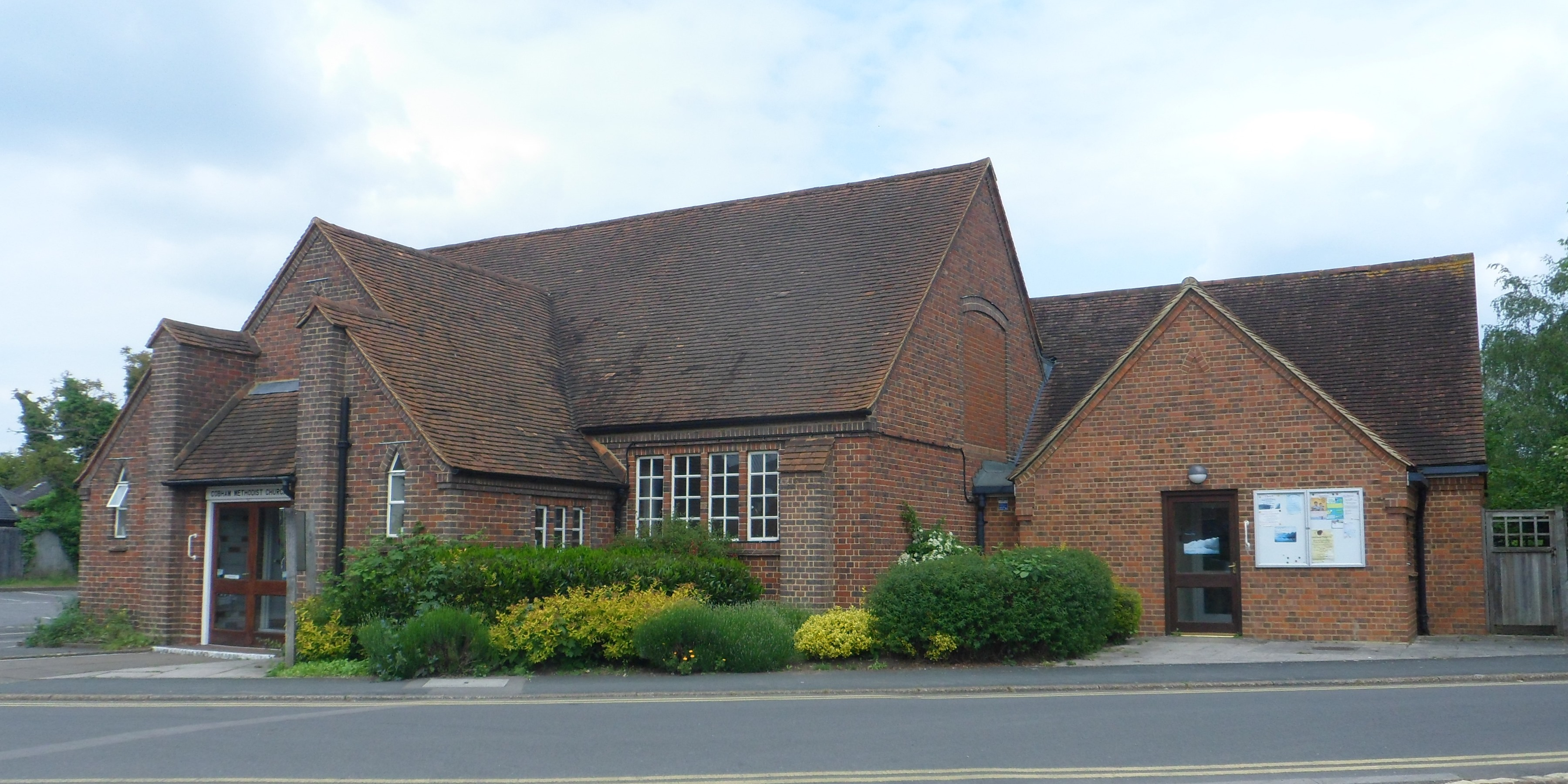
Cobham Methodist Church (pictured in 2014) went out of use in 2018.

The Methodist Statistical Returns published in 1947 (Note: The statistical return was compiled between 1940 and 1947 with the aim of documenting all Methodist chapels extant at that time: their location, previous affiliation prior to the Methodist Union of 1932, capacity, building materials and similar details.) recorded the existence of chapels with Wesleyan Methodist origins at Cobham, East Molesey, Esher, Walton-on-Thames and Weybridge. At East Molesey, Wesleyan services began in 1847 in a schoolroom. John Chubb of the Chubb and Sons locksmith company, an active and wealthy Wesleyan who founded various chapels and who sometimes fished in the River Thames at Molesey, bought some land for a chapel in 1866 and became a trustee of the church. A temporary building opened in 1867, succeeded by the present yellow-brick chapel in 1877. A Wesleyan chapel was built on Annett Road in Walton-on-Thames in the mid-19th century and was succeeded by the present chapel on Terrace Road in 1887. The brick chapel in Weybridge was registered in 1903. The Methodist church at Esher was registered in 1897 but closed by 2000, when its registration was cancelled. At Cobham—where John Wesley stopped on three occasions while travelling along the Portsmouth Road—a chapel opened on Cedar Road in 1862. A Sunday School was built next to it in the 1930s, and this was converted into a church in 1964 when the old chapel was demolished. In 2018 the church amalgamated with Cobham United Reformed Church in a Local ecumenical partnership and the Cedar Road building went out of use.

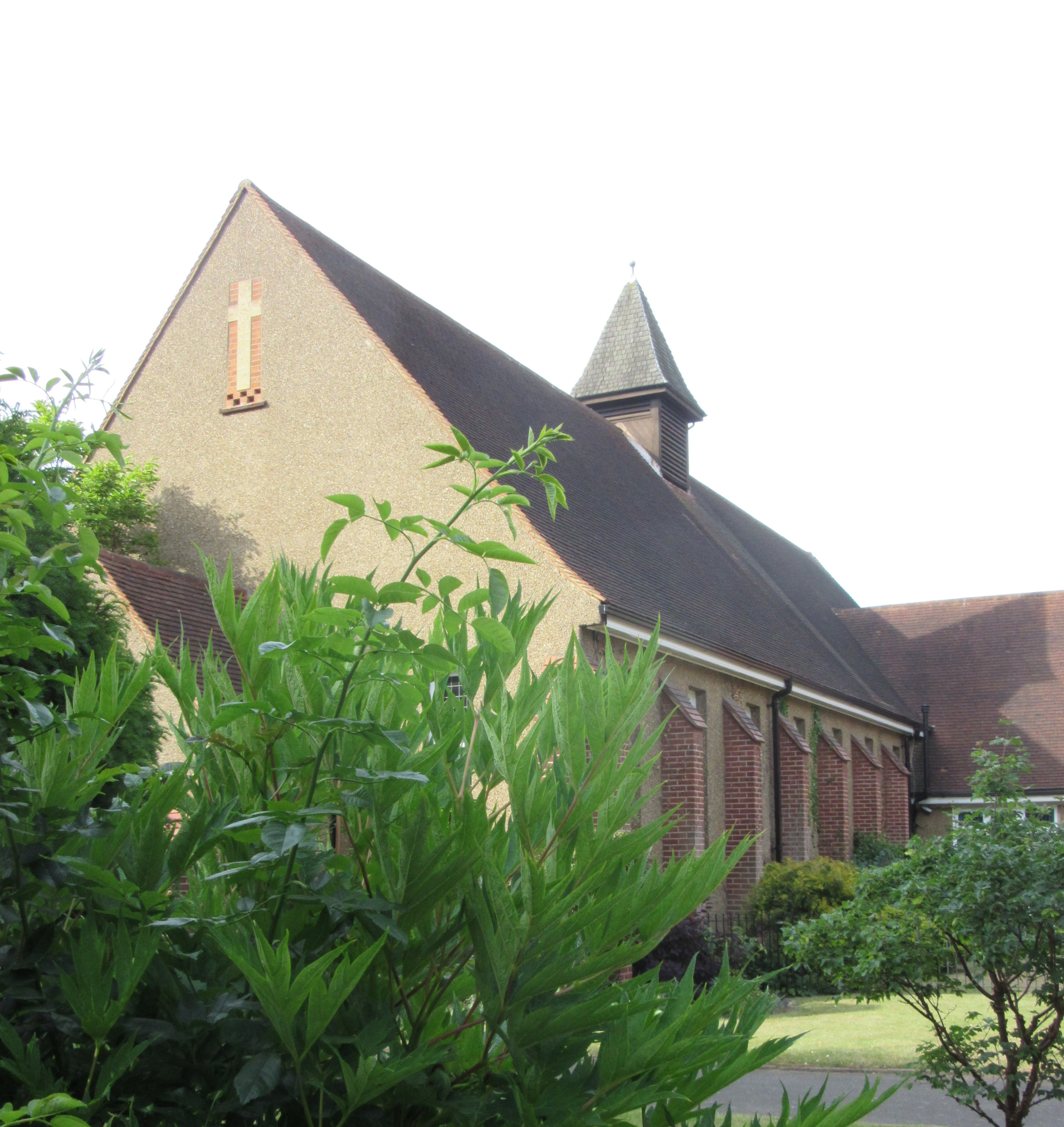
Members of the United Reformed Church in the Walton-on-Thames area are served by St Andrew's Church.

The United Reformed Church was formed in 1972 when the Congregational Church and the Presbyterian Church of England merged. Churches with a Congregational origin exist in Stoke d'Abernon, Thames Ditton and Weybridge, while Walton-on-Thames has a former Presbyterian church. The Thames Ditton church can trace its origins back to 1804, but the present building dates from 1899. The cause declined in the 1930s, and a near-decade long period of closure came to an end in 1947. A Congregational mission was founded at Cobham in 1847 and a permanent chapel was built seven years later, although the present building at Stoke d'Abernon (Cobham United Church, shared with Methodists) dates from 1963. House meetings briefly took place in Weybridge in 1855, and "much interest was excited" by open-air preaching five years later. This led to services being held in the billiard-room of a house, succeeded in 1864 by the present 350-capacity Gothic Revival church (described as "ferocious" by Nikolaus Pevsner). For many years there was also a Congregational church at Hersham serving both the village and nearby Walton-on-Thames: the circular yellow-brick building opened in 1844 and was altered and extended in 1858, 1864 and 1889. Around 1907 some members seceded and founded a second church nearby; this continued in use after the 1844 church closed, (Note: It passed into secular use and was demolished c. 1970.) and was replaced by a new building in 1983. This was deregistered in 2008 and is now in alternative use. St Andrew's Presbyterian Church in Walton-on-Thames was built in 1931 as a church hall, intended to be superseded by a permanent church; the hall remains in religious use by the United Reformed Church, and ancillary buildings have since been erected. Presbyterians had previously met for worship in a theatre since 1928.

A Baptist fellowship was founded in Esher in 1852 and a chapel was built and registered there in 1869. Four years later, members founded a "branch chapel" at Oxshott. A tin tabernacle was erected for Baptists in East Molesey in 1885 and replaced with a permanent building the following year, and in 1906 a chapel was registered in Walton-on-Thames. Only the last named has been in continuous use since it opened. Esher Baptist Church (originally called Park Road Chapel) closed in 1977 after a period of decline, but reopened in 1983 under its present name, Esher Green Baptist Church, as a church plant from Walton-on-Thames. The chapel at East Molesey closed in 1896, although a new church replaced it the following year. This closed in the 1930s and was demolished soon afterwards. The registration of Oxshott Baptist Chapel was cancelled in 1980. Also no longer in religious use are the borough's two Strict Baptist chapels: these were built at Claygate in 1860 and at Cobham in 1873. In 1994, a new Baptist church was established in a redundant Anglican church building in Hersham.

Other Christian denominations with a presence in the borough include Spiritualists, who worship in a church in Walton-on-Thames; Christian Scientists, who have churches and reading rooms at Claygate (serving the village and Esher) and Oatlands (serving Walton-on-Thames and Weybridge); Jehovah's Witnesses, whose Kingdom Hall at West Molesey was registered in 1971; The Church of Jesus Christ of Latter-day Saints, whose meetinghouse for the Kingston Ward opened in 1978 in Hinchley Wood; and the New Apostolic Church, which registered a building in Long Ditton in the same year. A much older cause is the Quaker meeting house in Esher, which was established in the 1790s and which has experienced minimal alteration since it was built. (An earlier Quaker meeting house established in 1678 at Cobham fell out of use in 1739.) Various nondenominational churches also exist in the borough, including Emmanuel Church at Hersham and Cornerstone The Church in Walton-on-Thames.

The Jewish population of the borough is represented by the Kingston Liberal Synagogue at Thames Ditton, which is in the Liberal tradition, and the Reform-tradition North West Surrey Synagogue at Oatlands.

== Religious affiliation ==
According to the United Kingdom Census 2011, 130,875 people live in Elmbridge. Of these, 64.16% identified themselves as Christian, 1.84% were Muslim, 1.22% were Hindu, 0.61% were Jewish, 0.52% were Buddhist, 0.4% were Sikh, 0.34% followed another religion, 23.39% claimed no religious affiliation and 7.53% did not state their religion. The proportions of Christians, Jews and Buddhists were higher than the figures in England as a whole (59.38%, 0.49% and 0.45% respectively), and the proportion of people who did not answer this census question was also higher than the overall figure of 7.18%. Islam, Hinduism and Sikhism had a lower following in the borough than in the country overall: in 2011, 5.02% of people in England were Muslim, 1.52% were Hindu and 0.79% were Sikh. The proportions of people in Elmbridge claiming adherence to another religion or no religious affiliation were also lower than the national figures of 0.43% and 24.74%.

== Administration ==
=== Anglican churches ===
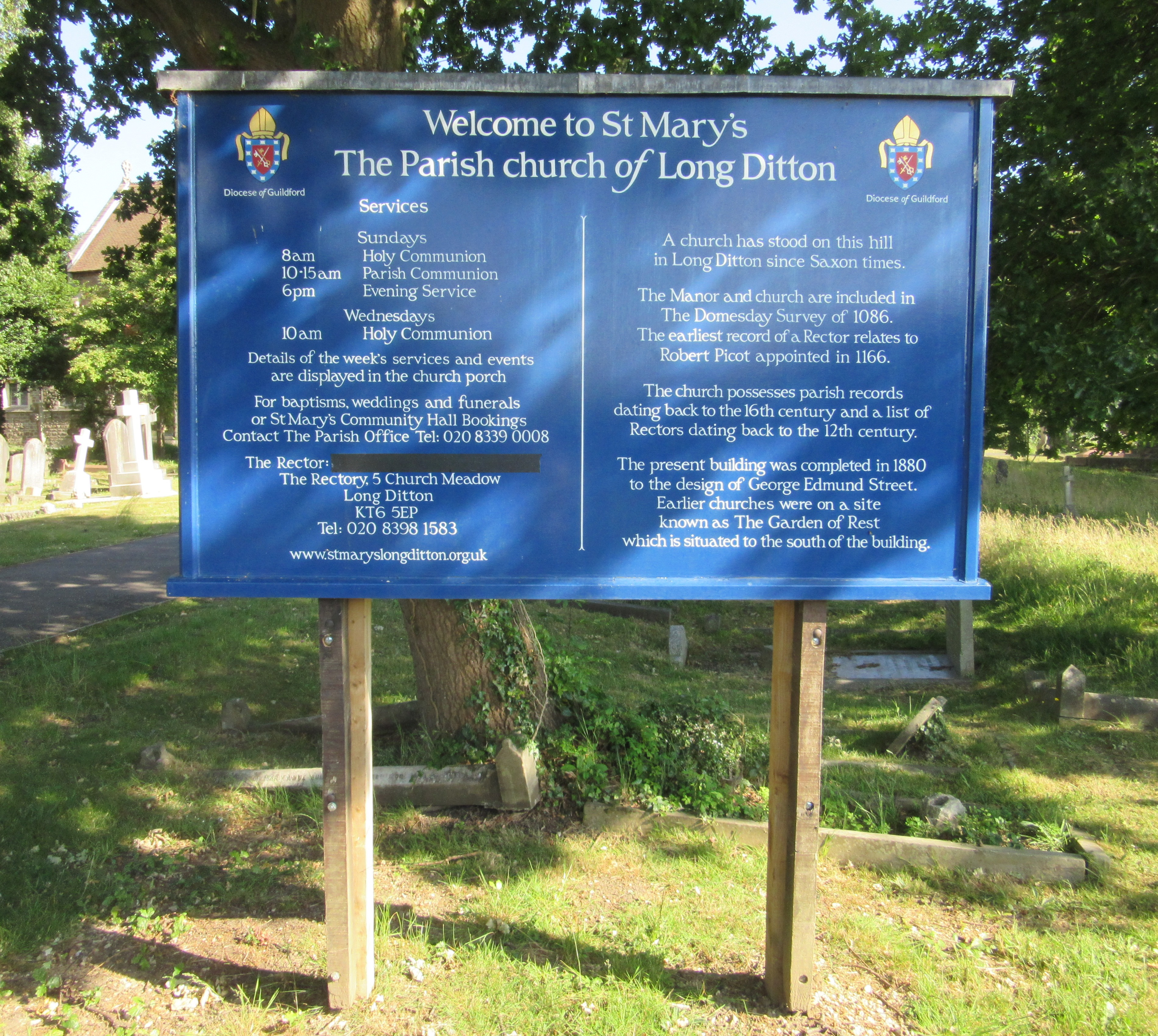
Elmbridge's Anglican churches, including St Mary's at Long Ditton, are in the Diocese of Guildford.

The Diocese of Guildford administers all of the borough's Anglican churches. Its seat is Guildford Cathedral. The churches are grouped geographically into deaneries. These lie within one of two Archdeaconries—Dorking Archdeaconry and Surrey Archdeaconry—which are an intermediate administrative level between the diocese and the deaneries. All of Elmbridge's churches are part of Emly Deanery or Leatherhead Deanery, both of which are in the Dorking Archdeaconry. Emly Deanery covers the churches in Claygate, East Molesey (St Mary's Church and St Paul's Church, which are separate parishes), Esher, Hersham, Hinchley Wood, Long Ditton, Oatlands, Thames Ditton, Walton-on-Thames, West Molesey, Weston Green and Weybridge. Cobham, Downside, Oxshott and Stoke d'Abernon are part of Leatherhead Deanery.

=== Roman Catholic churches ===
All Roman Catholic churches in Elmbridge are administered by Weybridge Deanery, one of 13 deaneries in the Roman Catholic Diocese of Arundel and Brighton, whose cathedral is at Arundel in West Sussex. The churches are at Claygate, (Note: The parish name is Esher.) Cobham, East Molesey, Hersham, Thames Ditton, Walton-on-Thames and Weybridge.

=== Other denominations ===
The 11-church Wey Valley Methodist Circuit administers the Methodist churches in Walton-on-Thames and Weybridge. East Molesey Methodist Church is one of five churches in the Teddington Methodist Circuit. Cobham United Church is one of eight churches in the Dorking and Horsham Methodist Circuit, and is also part of the Southern Synod of the United Reformed Church along with the church at Thames Ditton. Weybridge United Reformed Church and St Andrew's United Reformed Church at Walton-on-Thames are part of the Wessex Synod. Esher Green Baptist Church, Hersham Baptist Church and Walton Baptist Church are part of the Thames Valley District of London Baptists, the regional association responsible for Baptist churches in London and the surrounding area.

== Listed status ==
Grade	Criteria
Grade I	Buildings of exceptional interest, sometimes considered to be internationally important.
Grade II*	Particularly important buildings of more than special interest.
Grade II	Buildings of national importance and special interest.
Locally listed (L)	Buildings considered by the council to be of "local architectural or historic interest".

== Current places of worship ==
Current places of worship
Name	Image	Location	Denomination/ Affiliation	Grade	Notes	Refs
Holy Trinity Church (More images)		Claygate; 51.358919°N 0.339325°W	Anglican	II	Henry Edward Kendall was responsible for the design of Claygate's Neo-Norman Anglican parish church, which opened in 1840. The east end was redesigned in 1860 when the church was extended, but "may correspond to Kendall's original design". A rounded apse flanked by two short towers topped with octagonal spires faces the street; beyond this, the building is cruciform and has a four-bay nave. The walls are of grey brick dressed with stone. The parish was formed in 1841 from a portion of Thames Ditton parish.	
First Church of Christ, Scientist, Claygate and Esher (More images)		Claygate; 51.363389°N 0.349329°W	Christian Scientist	–	The Christian Science church serving the Esher area was registered for worship in January 1956.	
Church of the Holy Name (More images)		Claygate; 51.361666°N 0.357066°W	Roman Catholic	–	There was a church here from 1931, but the present building—"unassuming and unpretentious", but "a fine building" of high quality—dates from 1960 to 1961 and was designed by prolific Catholic church architect Francis G. Broadbent in his favoured "North Italian Romanesque" style. The entrance is through an arcade, from the corner of which a prominent campanile-style tower rises.	
St Andrew's Church (More images)		Cobham; 51.325990°N 0.411417°W	Anglican	I	The tower and south doorway of this church date from the Norman period. By the mid-12th century the present nave and chancel had been built. The latter was extended in the 13th century, and a north chapel was added. There are now north and south aisles and a south chapel as well, all dating from the 19th century when four separate programmes of restoration were carried out.	
Church of the Sacred Heart (More images)		Cobham; 51.329239°N 0.412967°W	Roman Catholic	–	Renowned architect Harry Stuart Goodhart-Rendel designed Cobham's "pretty Neo-Georgian church", which also has some elements of Classical architecture and, with its weatherboarded cupola, "an American flavour". It opened in 1958 and was registered in October of that year. Subsequent extensions in a matching style have been built, but the interior is little changed.	
St Michael's Chapel (More images)		Downside; 51.310899°N 0.406214°W	Anglican	L	This mission chapel south of Cobham is part of the parish of All Saints Church, Ockham.	
St Mary's Church (More images)		East Molesey; 51.398597°N 0.353557°W	Anglican	II	Nothing survives of East Molesey's 12th-century parish church except some memorial tablets and monuments which were moved to the present building, designed by Thomas Talbot Bury and built between 1864 and 1867. Charles Barry Jr. added the south aisle in 1883. The church is an Early English Gothic Revival building of stone with a west tower topped with a spire. The nave is of four bays.	
St Paul's Church (More images)		East Molesey; 51.404947°N 0.353660°W	Anglican	II	St Paul's was built in 1854–56 as a second church in East Molesey parish: population growth meant the 12th-century St Mary's Church was far too small. The tall spire was added in 1888. It is a Kentish ragstone church in the Perpendicular Gothic Revival style; the architects were Salter and Laforest. Stained glass designers including Charles Eamer Kempe, Lavers, Barraud and Westlake and the Mayer and Co. firm of Munich designed windows in the church.	
East Molesey Methodist Church (More images)		East Molesey; 51.401240°N 0.354046°W	Methodist	–	Wesleyan Methodists met for worship in East Molesey from 1847, initially in schoolrooms. A temporary chapel opened in 1867; ten years later, Alexander Lauder—a Methodist architect who designed many chapels for the denomination—was commissioned to design a permanent building. The "simple, pleasant edifice, in unostentatious Gothic", of yellow brick and stone chapel and with a capacity of 350, opened on 21 May 1877 and was registered in November 1878. Construction cost £1,175. A Sunday school building was added eight years later.	
House of Prayer		East Molesey; 51.398273°N 0.361328°W	Non-denominational	–	A house built around 1900 was bought in 1934 by the Sisters of the Christian Retreat, who had moved from France to London in 1848. They converted it into a school, but it later became a Christian retreat. It was formally registered as a place of worship in July 1995.	
St Barnabas' Church (More images)		East Molesey; 51.403138°N 0.356546°W	Roman Catholic	–	A group of nuns from France, The Ladies of the Mother of God, acquired a house on Vine Road in 1905 and converted it into a convent. Members of the public were allowed to attend Mass at the convent chapel. Encouraged by its popularity, the priest in charge of St Raphael's Church, Surbiton established a chapel of ease, erecting a secondhand tin tabernacle (previously used at Putney) next to the convent. It was dedicated to St Barnabas, opened in November 1906 and registered two years later. The church was later allocated its own parish, becoming independent of Surbiton. In 1931 a new permanent church was built next to it, also dedicated to St Barnabas. It was registered in May of that year. The "plain but attractive" Romanesque Revival brick church has not been altered since it opened.	
Christ Church (More images)		Esher; 51.370016°N 0.366866°W	Anglican	II	Benjamin Ferrey designed Esher's new parish church in 1853–54. It is a large Early English Gothic Revival structure of stone with a tall west tower and spire, lit by lancet windows in the clerestory and with aisles and transepts on both sides. Ninian Comper designed the stained glass in the east window in 1909, and John Roddam Spencer Stanhope painted the reredos.	
Esher Green Baptist Church (More images)		Esher; 51.369479°N 0.366706°W	Baptist	–	The chapel, originally called Park Road Chapel, was built in 1869 for members of a Baptist fellowship which had formed 17 years earlier. The worshippers had used the Quaker meeting house before the chapel opened. The church closed in May 1977 because of declining membership, and the building became a showroom; its registration (dating from November 1869) was formally cancelled in March 1980. The church reopened under its present name in 1983 under the leadership of Walton Baptist Church in Walton-on-Thames; it was reregistered in July of that year.	
Friends Meeting House (More images)		Esher; 51.368316°N 0.364748°W	Quaker	II	Most sources give the date of construction of this meeting house as 1797, but a date of 1793 has also been suggested. The simple four-bay façade retains its "plain Georgian character": it has arched windows flanking a straight-headed entrance with double doors. The walls are of yellow-grey brick, and there is a pyramidal slate roof. The building was extended at the rear in the 20th century. The internal fixtures are original and are of high quality. The meeting house sits within a burial ground which is enclosed by high brick walls.	
St Peter's Church (More images)		Hersham; 51.364136°N 0.402168°W	Anglican	II	The first Anglican church in Hersham, part of the parish of Walton-on-Thames, was dedicated to the Holy Trinity and was built in 1839. It was replaced by the present church, designed by John Loughborough Pearson, in 1887. The cruciform Early English Gothic Revival church is of pale stone and has a tower with a broach spire, four-bay aisles with arcades and a three-bay chancel. Construction cost about £9,000; the land was donated by a local resident. A series of internal alterations were completed and dedicated in 1907.	
Hersham Baptist Church (More images)		Hersham; 51.374515°N 0.391801°W	Baptist	–	This was built as a second Anglican church for Hersham, supplementing St Peter's parish church, and incorporated two stained glass windows from the demolished predecessor of St Peter's Church; the windows had been retained by the churchwarden. The new church was dedicated to Saint Andrew and opened in 1936; its architect was R. J. D. Beaty-Pownall. The Diocese of Guildford declared it redundant on 1 September 1989 and sold it to a Baptist group in October 1992; they reregistered it as Hersham Baptist Church in October 1994.	
Emmanuel Evangelical Church (More images)		Hersham; 51.367152°N 0.403297°W	Non-denominational	–	Although in use as a registered place of worship for much longer, this was only registered for the solemnisation of marriages (under the name Emmanuel Hall) in September 1975. As of 2002 there were two Sunday services and one every Wednesday.	
All Saints Church (More images)		Hersham; 51.366532°N 0.401015°W	Roman Catholic	–	The church opened in June 1960 and was registered in that month, although the formal opening ceremony (attended by the Bishop of Southwark Cyril Cowderoy) took place in November of that year. Construction started in 1959 to the design of Lawrence Tomei and John Maxwell. It is a large cruciform church of brick, incorporating some prefabricated panels on the exterior and lit by clerestory windows.	
St Christopher's Church (More images)		Hinchley Wood; 51.379947°N 0.332379°W	Anglican	–	Hinchley Wood's Anglican church opened and was consecrated in 1953.	
Church of Jesus Christ of Latter-day Saints, Kingston Ward Chapel (More images)		Hinchley Wood; 51.379927°N 0.343082°W	Latter-day Saint	–	This meetinghouse opened in 1978 and was registered in August of that year.	
St Mary's Church (More images)		Long Ditton; 51.380527°N 0.316833°W	Anglican	II	A 12th-century church was replaced by a new building designed by Robert Taylor in 1776. This was in turn demolished in 1880 when the present building, started in 1878, was completed. It was designed by George Edmund Street and is of stone; the roofs are of slate, and there is a double bell-cot instead of a tower or spire. It has a chancel, nave and transepts, and there are aisles on both sides of the nave. Some old memorials from the original church survive. The church sits within a large churchyard.	
St Mary's Church (More images)		Oatlands; 51.371814°N 0.427992°W	Anglican	II	The church was built between 1861 and 1862 as a chapel of ease in Walton-on-Thames parish. It is Early English Gothic Revival in style and has an aisled nave, an apsidal chancel and a battlemented corner tower which is partly detached.	
First Church of Christ, Scientist, Walton and Weybridge (More images)		Oatlands; 51.379604°N 0.433417°W	Christian Scientist	–	The Christian Science church serving this part of the borough was registered for worship in December 1946 with the name First Church of Christ, Scientist, Walton-on-Thames.	
North West Surrey Synagogue (More images)		Oatlands; 51.372562°N 0.438261°W	Jewish (Reform)	–	The first Jewish presence in Weybridge came in 1937 when a school was opened. Some Shabbat services were held in the building, and this was used until 1981 when a prefabricated building on another site was converted into a synagogue. This was registered in May 1982. The current synagogue, a former school gymnasium, opened in 1985.	
St Andrew's Church (More images)		Oxshott; 51.331409°N 0.362356°W	Anglican	L	Anglican services in this village, part of the parish of Stoke d'Abernon, were held in a school until November 1905, when a tin tabernacle was erected on some donated land. Within four years this building was too small for the congregation, and after fundraising efforts in the locality the Duchess of Albany Princess Helena of Waldeck and Pyrmont of nearby Claremont laid the foundation stone of the present St Andrew's Church in May 1911. It was consecrated ten months later. Alterations and extensions were undertaken in 1968–70 and 2014. The church, designed by Caröe and Passmore, is Gothic Revival in style.	
St Mary's Church (More images)		Stoke d'Abernon; 51.313913°N 0.381199°W	Anglican	I	The church was substantially restored in the Victorian era, but much of the structure is either Saxon or Norman in origin. The large, wide nave has a north aisle, added c. 1190, and alongside the shorter chancel is the Norbury Chapel, built in 1490 in the Perpendicular Gothic style by Sir John Norbury (Note: A relative of Henry Norbury. The family held the manor of Stoke d'Abernon.) to commemorate the Battle of Bosworth Field. There is also a small tower at the northwest corner.	
Cobham United Church (More images)		Stoke d'Abernon; 51.322986°N 0.392308°W	United Reformed Church and Methodist	–	The present building dates from 1962 and was registered in April 1963, but a Congregational chapel (no longer extant) had opened in the parish of Cobham on 2 May 1854. It was built at a cost of £600 and succeeded various hired premises in the village and in nearby Downside. Over the years it had links with the chapels at Hersham, Weybridge and Byfleet. The new church was known as Cobham United Reformed Church until the town's Methodist congregation joined in 2018.	
St Nicholas' Church (More images)		Thames Ditton; 51.392556°N 0.332746°W	Anglican	I	St Nicholas' Church is mostly 13th-century, although some older work survives inside. It is dominated by its massive, wide tower at the west end. The south aisle and its arcade, and the chapel on the same side, were rebuilt in 1864 by Benjamin Ferrey, and the windows and north chapel were renewed in the same century. Inside are several memorials and monuments of the 16th, 17th and 18th centuries. The church is mostly of flint and stone, although some of the 19th-century work was executed in brick.	
Kingston Liberal Synagogue (More images)		Thames Ditton; 51.386120°N 0.322692°W	Jewish (Liberal)	–	The community was formed in April 1967 (as Kingston and District Progressive Jewish Community) and met in the Quaker meeting house in Kingston upon Thames until the present building in Long Ditton was bought in 1976.	
New Apostolic Church (More images)		Thames Ditton; 51.389387°N 0.322884°W	New Apostolic Church	–	This church was registered in September 1978.	
Church of Our Lady of Lourdes (More images)		Thames Ditton; 51.388595°N 0.346799°W	Roman Catholic	–	D.A. Reid, a partner in the firm of F.G. Broadbent and Partners, designed this new Catholic church for the Thames Ditton area in 1965. It was registered in August of that year. This was shortly after the Second Vatican Council, which brought about changes in church design and layout, and the "big, austere [and] very striking" church was a response to the new ideas. It is a circular building of brick and concrete with a shallow domed roof, with a large sculpture of Christ above the west entrance. Pierre Fourmaintraux designed some of the stained glass. A large hall was built in the same style in 1988.	
Thames Ditton United Reformed Church (More images)		Thames Ditton; 51.390211°N 0.338491°W	United Reformed Church	–	A Dissenting chapel opened in 1804 in the parish of Thames Ditton and soon adopted Congregationalist principles. After a period of decline, Kingston Congregational Church took charge and revived the cause, leading to the construction of a new chapel. Work started in June 1899 and it opened on 28 November of that year; formal registration followed in May 1900. Construction cost £2,500. Another period of decline resulted in closure in 1938, but the chapel reopened in October 1947. The original chapel was demolished in the 1960s and replaced with a new hall.	
St Mary's Church (More images)		Walton-on-Thames; 51.387089°N 0.417696°W	Anglican	I	The church existed by the 12th century, and some Norman work survives in the north arcade. As originally built, it consisted of a short nave and chancel; the latter was extended and rebuilt in the 14th century, and aisles were added on both sides of the nave. The "curious" buttresses of the west tower were added in the 19th century during a restoration programme. Inside the church, Richard Boyle, 2nd Viscount Shannon (died 1740) is commemorated by a large, "exquisitely rendered and carved" monument by Louis-François Roubiliac.	
St John's Church (More images)		Walton-on-Thames; 51.382357°N 0.400084°W	Anglican	–	Walton's second Anglican church, part of the parish of St Mary's, opened in 1953 and serves the eastern part of the town.	
Walton Baptist Church (More images)		Walton-on-Thames; 51.384511°N 0.416520°W	Baptist	–	The town's Baptist church was built in 1901 and was registered five years later.	
Walton-on-Thames Methodist Church (More images)		Walton-on-Thames; 51.388404°N 0.417422°W	Methodist	L	The church, originally Wesleyan, dates from 1887 and replaced an older building nearby. It was registered for marriages in August 1889. Substantial alterations have taken place in the 21st century to the red-brick and stone building, which has a corner tower topped with a spire.	
Cornerstone The Church (More images)		Walton-on-Thames; 51.373171°N 0.415539°W	Non-denominational	–	This Charismatic Evangelical church was founded in 1990 but has occupied its present building, a former car showroom, since around 2015.	
St Erconwald's Church (More images)		Walton-on-Thames; 51.385689°N 0.413361°W	Roman Catholic	–	Architect A. Reckitt designed the original church building, now the parish hall, in 1905. It was superseded by Wallace J. Gregory's "substantial brick church" on an adjacent site; it opened in 1937 when only part of the building had been completed, and work continued until 1951. The entrance porch, recessed between two tall wings and with a statue on top, "has a certain drama".	
Walton Christian Spiritualist Church (More images)		Walton-on-Thames; 51.375315°N 0.407270°W	Spiritualist	–	The church was founded in the mid-1930s in a building in Walton-on-Thames town centre. A licence for marriages was granted in August 1982.	
St Andrew's United Reformed Church (More images)		Walton-on-Thames; 51.381601°N 0.414074°W	United Reformed Church	–	Presbyterians, many of whom had Scottish origins, started to meet for worship in Walton-on-Thames in 1928; they used a local theatre. Land was bought for a church and church hall, and work began on the latter in 1931. The church, which was intended to be built alongside, never came to fruition, and the original building has been used for worship ever since. New buildings were built alongside after World War II to provide extra accommodation instead.	
St George's Church (More images)		West End; 51.361131°N 0.381944°W	Anglican	L	This tin tabernacle existed by 1911 as a chapel of ease to Esher parish church. It remains in active use as part of the parish of Esher; one service is held every Sunday.	
St Peter's Church (More images)		West Molesey; 51.403084°N 0.371569°W	Anglican	II	Apart from the 15th-century font, the ragstone and flint tower is the oldest part of this church: it is 16th-century and Perpendicular Gothic in style. The rest of the church was rebuilt in 1843 using yellow brick. The nave has aisles on both sides with arcades of unequal length (four bays to the north aisle, five to the south), and there are lancet windows on both sides. Several old memorial brasses survive inside.	
Kingdom Hall (More images)		West Molesey; 51.400579°N 0.370503°W	Jehovah's Witnesses	–	Since the closure of the Kingdom Hall in Walton-on-Thames in 1993, this facility has served the West Molesey and Walton-on-Thames Congregations of Jehovah's Witnesses. The building was registered for worship in April 1971 and for marriages just under a year later.	
All Saints Church (More images)		Weston Green; 51.384069°N 0.349394°W	Anglican	II	A red-brick chapel of ease to St Nicholas' Church at Thames Ditton opened at Weston Green in 1901. It was also dedicated to St Nicholas. The new church, described as "among Edward Maufe's best works" and an "excellent, complete" example of his style, was designed in 1939 at the same time as the architect was working on Guildford Cathedral, whose design is similar. The plain white church is Romanesque Revival in style. It has a tall bell-tower at one corner and very tall arched windows. The nave is of five bays.	
St James's Church (More images)		Weybridge; 51.371570°N 0.461030°W	Anglican	II*	The ancient church here was replaced by a large new building in 1848—one of John Loughborough Pearson's early designs. It is Early English Gothic Revival in style and has a tall tower with a broach spire at the west end. The "extremely ornate" chancel, decorated with marble, is flanked by an organ chamber and a vestry, and there is a double aisle on the south side (the second aisle was added in 1864) as well as a single north aisle. Several memorials of the 16th century and later were retrieved from the old church and reinstated here.	
World Mission Korean Presbyterian Church (More images)		Weybridge; 51.366438°N 0.459995°W	Korean Presbyterian	II*	This was built as St Charles Borromeo Catholic Church in 1880–81 to the design of A.E. Purdie, succeeding a much smaller chapel of 1836 which became the sacristy. The original building was of stuccoed brick; its successor is a stone and ashlar Gothic Revival building with a chancel and nave of two and four bays respectively. King Louis Philippe I was buried here until 1876; his mausoleum (c. 1850) survives. The church was replaced by a larger place of worship, the Church of Christ Prince of Peace, elsewhere in the town in 1989 and was sold to the Korean Presbyterian Church, who reregistered it under its current name in November 1997.	
Weybridge Methodist Church (More images)		Weybridge; 51.369604°N 0.462721°W	Methodist	–	This red-brick church was built for Wesleyans and had a capacity of 200. Its registration dates from January 1903.	
Church of Christ the Prince of Peace (More images)		Weybridge; 51.374546°N 0.460471°W	Roman Catholic	–	Weybridge's new Catholic church, succeeding St Charles Borromeo and the demolished St Martin de Porres, opened before Christmas in 1989 and was registered in March 1990. Certain fixtures, such as benches, statues and a crucifix, were retrieved from the old churches and installed here. Next to the church is a new Catholic school dedicated to St Charles Borromeo.	
Weybridge United Reformed Church (More images)		Weybridge; 51.368080°N 0.446443°W	United Reformed Church	II	The minister of the Congregational chapel at Hersham held some services in a hired cottage in Weybridge in 1855, but this effort was short-lived. Five years later, Chamberlain of London Benjamin Scott moved to the town and began to hold outdoor services. The popularity of these led to the founding of Weybridge Congregational Church in 1864. Scott bought the land, and Reverend François Baron—another new arrival in Weybridge—became the first minister. The foundation stone was laid on 4 July 1864 and the first service was held in May 1865. A licence for marriages was granted in October 1866. John Tarring's Decorated Gothic Revival cruciform church was described as "ferocious" by architectural historian Nikolaus Pevsner.	
St Mark's Church (More images)		Whiteley Village; 51.352914°N 0.430104°W	Anglican	II	Walter Tapper designed the church in this model village in 1912. Its Early English Gothic Revival design is at odds with the prevailing Arts and Crafts ("Hampstead Garden Suburb") style of the village. It is a plain cruciform building with rendered walls and a central tower. The chancel is of three bays; the nave is longer, with four. The church is in the parish of St Peter's, Hersham.	

== Former places of worship ==
Former places of worship
Name	Image	Location	Denomination/ Affiliation	Grade	Notes	Refs
Ebenezer Chapel		Claygate; 51.357452°N 0.337790°W	Strict Baptist	–	The chapel was not registered for marriages until July 1937, but it was built in 1860 for a group of Strict Baptists who had been meeting in alternative premises (a house, then a barn) for the previous ten years. The church was formally constituted on 27 May 1861. The building is now a house.	
Emmanuel Hall		Claygate; 51.358008°N 0.334528°W	Non-denominational	–	This building was registered for marriages in October 1941. It is now used by Holy Trinity parish church as a youth centre.	
Cobham Methodist Church (More images)		Cobham; 51.328849°N 0.409269°W	Methodist	–	This church on Cedar Road closed on 20 May 2018 when the congregation united with the United Reformed Church at Stoke d'Abernon. The building dates from the 1930s and was originally a Sunday school; it was registered as a church in March 1964 in place of the original chapel which had stood next to it since 1862. This was demolished in 1964 after falling into disrepair. Wesleyans had previously met for worship in a converted barn nearby.	
Cobham Gospel Hall (More images)		Cobham; 51.333036°N 0.412228°W	Open Brethren	–	This Gospel hall was registered with the name Mission Hall in September 1941. As of 2002 there were two Sunday services and one every Wednesday, but the last service was held on 20 May 2006, and in July 2013 it was acquired by Cobham Free School, who converted it into temporary premises pending the opening of new classrooms on another site in the town.	
Ebenezer Baptist Chapel (More images)		Cobham; 51.329072°N 0.409995°W	Strict Baptist	–	Strict Baptist worshippers who had met in Cobham since 1870 were given land on which to build a chapel in 1872. It opened on 8 July 1873 and was registered for marriages in August 1884. After its closure in 1941, it was converted into a house.	
Molesey Baptist Chapel		East Molesey; 51.402583°N 0.344116°W	Baptist	–	This chapel was only in religious use for 10 years, although a successor elsewhere in the town lasted longer. Worshippers travelled to Kingston until a tin tabernacle was provided in 1885; this was succeeded by a large church the following year. It opened on 14 December 1886; but it was soon found that the location (on Bridge Road at the far eastern end of the town) was unsuitable, and the size of the building and the consequent debts were too great for the congregation. The chapel was sold and was converted into commercial premises.	
St George's Church (More images)		Esher; 51.369236°N 0.364466°W	Anglican	I	Esher's original parish church was formally declared redundant in 1986 and vested in the care of the Churches Conservation Trust. "A delightful, most endearing little church", it sits behind the High Street and dates entirely from the 1540s, with the exception of the south chapel of 1725–26 and the north aisle of 1812. The former, attributed to John Vanbrugh, was built as a private chapel for the Dukes of Newcastle of the Claremont estate. The many monuments and memorials inside include a triptych depicting Prince Leopold and Princess Charlotte of Wales which was moved here from Claremont.	
Esher Methodist Chapel		Esher; 51.369810°N 0.368428°W	Methodist	–	This brick-built, 200-capacity chapel was built on Wolsey Road for Wesleyan Methodists. It was registered for marriages in August 1897, but its registration was cancelled in January 2000 and it is now a nursery school.	
Trinity United Reformed Church (More images)		Hersham; 51.367587°N 0.404987°W	United Reformed Church	–	Seceders from a Congregational chapel built elsewhere in Hersham in 1844 founded a new church on Queens Road, opposite Brampton Gardens, in 1909. It was registered in December of that year, but closed in 1977 and was replaced by a smaller building on the same site in 1983. This in turn closed and was deregistered in 2008, and the building is now used as a Montessori school.	
Oxshott Baptist Chapel		Oxshott; 51.332635°N 0.366244°W	Baptist	–	The chapel was founded in 1873 by members of Park Road Chapel in Esher and was the only church in Oxshott until St Andrew's Church opened. It was registered for marriages in July 1902, but the chapel closed and the registration was cancelled in March 1980.	
Kingdom Hall		Walton-on-Thames; 51.392382°N 0.411261°W	Jehovah's Witnesses	–	This Kingdom Hall was built in 1963 and was registered for worship in February of that year; a marriage licence was granted two years later. It went out of use in 1993 and is now used as a nursery school.	
The Sanctuary		Whiteley Village; 51.349026°N 0.429814°W	Non-denominational	–	A chapel for Nonconformists was built in the planned community of Whiteley Village in 1925–26 to the Classical design of Maurice Webb. It was registered in August 1963. The building is no longer used for worship, and the church community (now known as Whiteley Village Community Church) is now based in a room in a different building in the village.	

== Bibliography ==
- Baker, Rowland G. M. (1977). Methodism in East Molesey. East Molesey: East Molesey Methodist Church. Archived from the original on 5 November 2020.
- Baker, Rowland G. M. (1986). The Book of Molesey. Chesham: Barracuda Books. ISBN 0-86023-251-4. Archived from the original on 22 April 2016.
- Blatch, Mervyn (1997). The Churches of Surrey. Chichester: Phillimore & Co. ISBN 1-86077-002-9.
- Chambers, Ralph (1952). The Strict Baptist Chapels of England: Surrey and Hampshire. Vol. 1. Thornton Heath: Ralph Chambers.
- Cleal, Edward E.; Crippen, T. G. (1908). The story of Congregationalism in Surrey. London: James Clarke & Co.
- Facey, Roy A., ed. (1981). International Church Index (Doctrinal). Index Publications. ISBN 0-907578-00-4.
- Hill, Roy (2002) [1990]. The Assemblies Address Book (PDF) (5th ed.). Bristol: Christian Year Publications. ISBN 1-872734-25-1. Archived from the original (PDF) on 19 September 2004.
- Kelly, Bernard W. (1907). Historical Notes on English Catholic Missions (PDF). London: Kegan Paul, Trench, Trübner & Co.
- Methodist Church of Great Britain (1947). Methodist Church Buildings: Statistical Returns including Seating Accommodation as at July 1st, 1940 (PDF). Manchester: The Department for Chapel Affairs. (Available online in 14 parts; Guide to abbreviations on page 6)
- Nairn, Ian; Pevsner, Nikolaus (1971) [1962]. The Buildings of England: Surrey (2nd ed.). Harmondsworth: Penguin Books. ISBN 0-300-09675-5.
- Stell, Christopher (2002). Nonconformist Chapels and Meeting-houses in Eastern England. Swindon: English Heritage. ISBN 1-873592-50-7.
- Stockwell, Arthur H., ed. (1909). The Baptist Churches of Surrey. London: Arthur Stockwell.
