= St Mary's Church, Stoke d'Abernon =

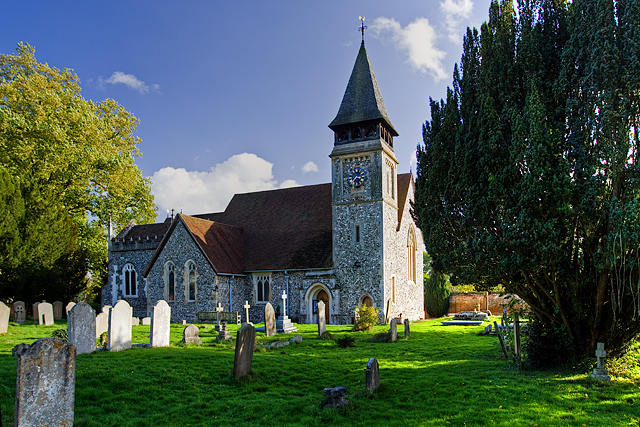
- St Mary's Church, Stoke d'Abernon
- 51°18′50″N 0°22′52″W
- OS grid reference: TQ 129 584
- Location: Stoke d'Abernon
- Country: England
- Denomination: Church of England
- Website: St Mary's, Stoke d'Abernon

History
- Dedication: Mary the Virgin

Architecture
- Heritage designation: Grade I
- Designated: 14 August 1953

Administration
- Diocese: Diocese of Guildford

The Church of St Mary is an Anglican church in the village of Stoke d'Abernon, Surrey, in the Diocese of Guildford. The church, the oldest parts of which date from the 7th century, is a Grade I listed building.

== Description ==
=== History ===
The original church was built in the 7th century; substantial parts of the south wall date from this time. In building the Saxon church, some bricks, tiles and worked stones from Roman buildings were re-used. It was one of the churches in this area built soon after the introduction of Christianity by Saint Augustine, the first Archbishop of Canterbury.

The church was an ecclesia propria, being built on private grounds by a feudal lord. There is a high-level door, now blocked, in the south wall of the nave, leading to the thegn's gallery, where, until the 13th century when the square chancel was built, the lord of the manor had his own chapel.

=== Nave ===
The north aisle of the nave dates from about 1190. Stonework of the entrance in the south wall, blocked in 1866, can be seen; it was probably a modification of the original Saxon doorway.

The pulpit was given by Sir Francis Vincent in 1620, when he became a baronet. His arms and family motto are on the sounding board, which has elaborate wrought-iron supports. The pulpit is heptagonal and made of walnut; it stands on a central column, and is supported by seven part-animal, part-human caryatids.

The church chest, below the pulpit, is of oak and dates from late 12th or early 13th century. The organ, at the west end of the nave, was made for the church by Frobenius of Denmark in 1975.

=== Chancel ===
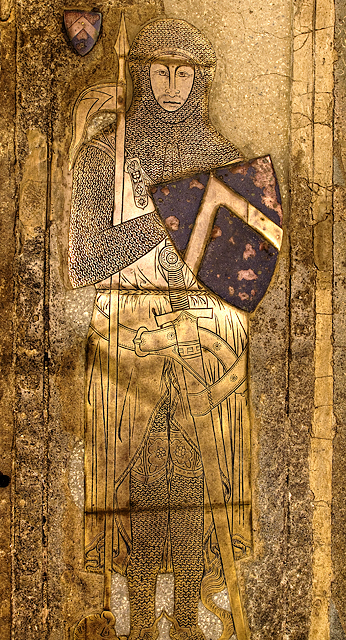
Monumental brass of Sir John D'Abernon the Elder

The chancel, which replaced a rounded Saxon apse, dates from about 1240. It has a quadripartite vault.

In front of the altar rail are brasses of Sir John d'Abernon (died 1277) and of his son Sir John d'Abernon (died 1327). The monumental brass of Sir John the Elder is one of the finest in existence. It shows him as a knight in armour; he carries a lance as well as a sword, which is thought to be unique, and there is original blue enamel in the shield.

The chancel arch, replacing the narrower Saxon arch, dates from the 1866 restoration of the church by Ford and Hesketh.

=== Norbury Chapel ===
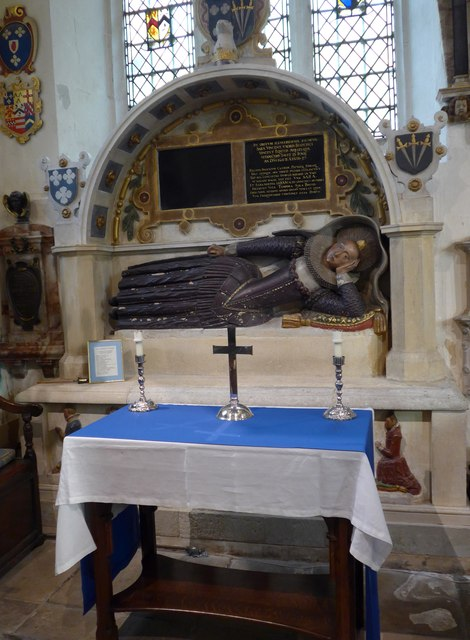
Tomb of Lady Sarah Vincent

The Norbury chapel, to the north of the chancel, was built about 1490 by Sir John Norbury (died 1521), to commemorate the victory at the Battle of Bosworth. His memorial, showing a kneeling knight, is in the east wall of the chapel. There is a monument to Sir Thomas Vincent (died 1613) and Lady Jane Vincent (died 1619) by the north wall, and by the east wall is a monument to Lady Sarah Vincent (died 1608), their daughter-in-law; these have life-size painted effigies.

In the east wall are the ashes of Edgar Vincent, 1st Viscount D'Abernon (1857–1941).

== See also ==
- Grade I listed buildings in Surrey
- List of places of worship in Elmbridge
- Monumental brass
