= St George's Church, Esher =

St George's, Esher
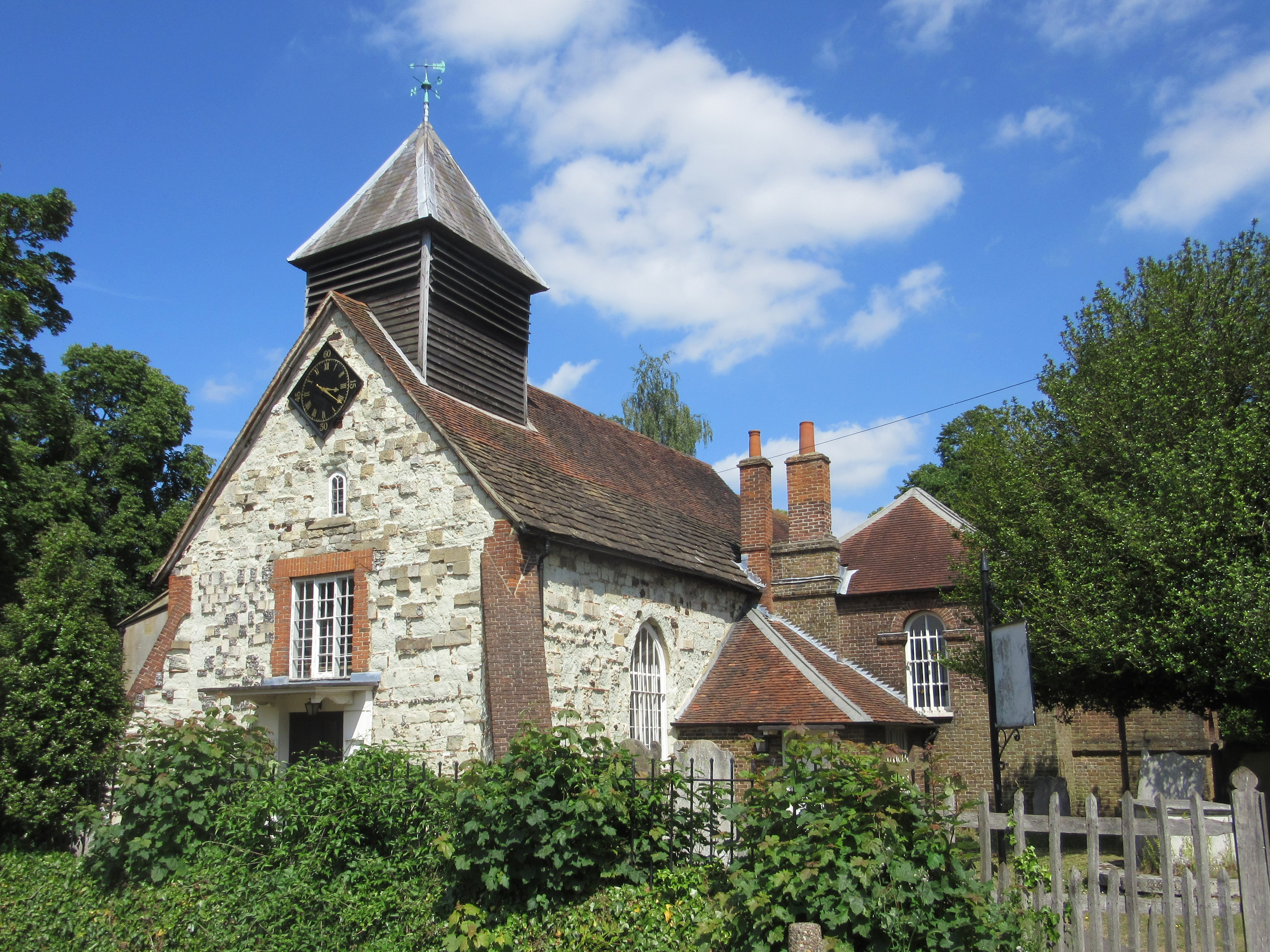
- St George's, Esher

- Location in Surrey
- 51°22′09″N 0°21′52″W
- Location: Esher, Surrey
- Country: England
- Denomination: Church of England
- Website: St George's Church website

History
- Status: Consecrated

Architecture
- Functional status: No regular services; open on occasion
- Heritage designation: Grade I listed
- Designated: 14 August 1953
- Architectural type: Tudor, Georgian

Specifications
- Materials: Body: chequered sandstone, clunch, undressed flint and brick Roof: stone and clay tiles

Administration
- Diocese: Guildford
- Archdeaconry: Dorking
- Parish: Esher

St George's Church, Esher is a Grade I listed Anglican church in Esher, Surrey, England. Built in the 16th century, it was Esher's parish church for 300 years, though later worshippers included Queen Victoria. However, by the mid-19th century the building was deemed too small for the growing population, and was replaced by Christ Church, built nearby on Esher Green in 1853/4. St George's was not therefore subjected to Victorian ‘improvements’, and its Tudor origins remain evident. It is now cared for by the Churches Conservation Trust.

In 1725-1726, Thomas Pelham-Holles, 1st Duke of Newcastle-upon-Tyne commissioned John Vanbrugh to add a brick extension to the south side of the church. It contains a family chamber pew for Newcastle. Newcastle lived at the nearby country house of Claremont, and therefore worshipped at St George's. Newcastle's brother, Henry Pelham, also worshipped in the church. Newcastle's successors at Claremont are thought to have continued attending the same church for over a century. The group of residents of Claremont included at various points Princess Charlotte Augusta of Wales, her husband Prince Leopold of Saxe-Coburg, Leopold's niece-by-marriage Princess Victoria, Victoria' youngest son Prince Leopold, Duke of Albany, and Princess Alice, Countess of Athlone. In 1870, Victoria commissioned a sculpted triptych memorial for Charlotte and Leopold. The memorial still stands at the west end of the north aisle.

== History ==
Esher is mentioned in the Domesday Book, but there is no mention of a church; the first record of a patron and rector appears in 1292, but little remains of any previous building, except a doorway on the south side of the nave and the priest's door (now walled in) on the north side of the chancel, both probably 15th century. A rare example of an English church built during the Reformation, the present building was built about 1540 of a jumbled assortment of chequered sandstone, clunch, undressed flint and brick, and roofed with both stone and clay tiles, with a small oaken timber bell- or clock-turret with pyramid spire. Inside, the Tudor open roof remains, with timber tie and collar beams; referring to its vernacular construction, Simon Jenkins says: ". . . St. George's cannot decide whether it is a barn masquerading as a chapel, or a chapel masquerading as a barn." The wooden clock-turret houses the original clock mechanism from the early 17th century, the face and hour hand being added in 1783. Various additions made in the 18th and early 19th centuries include the three-decker pulpit and reredos of 1722 with fine carving, the Newcastle Pew (1725-26), and the brick north aisle with crenellated gables (1812).

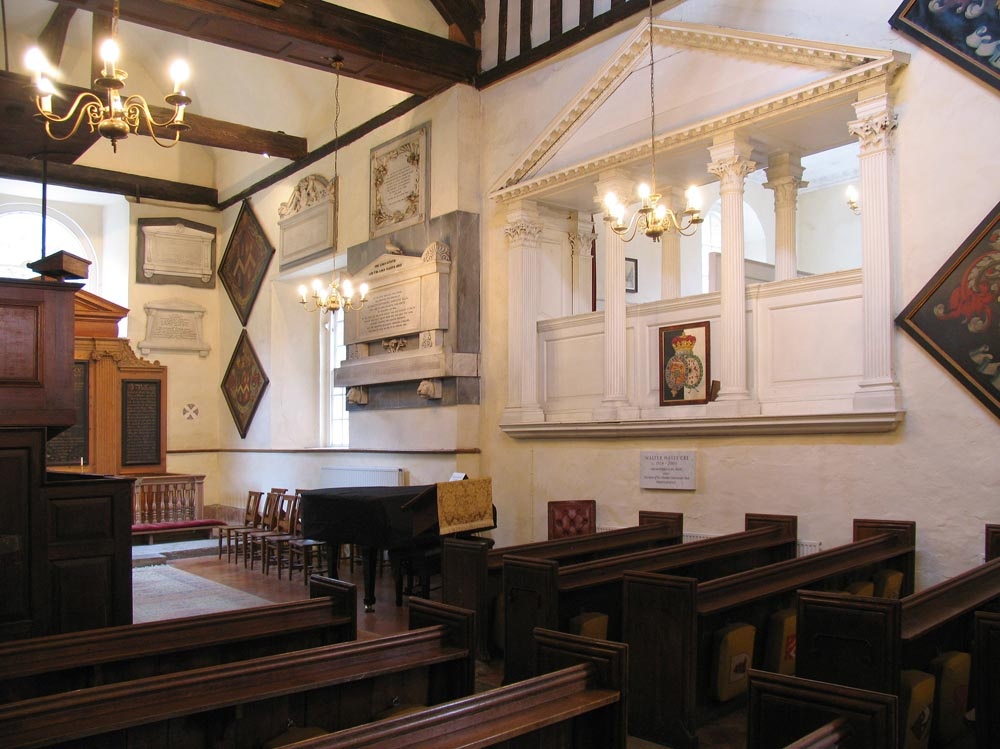
Interior: Newcastle Pew on right; pulpit & reredos on left

=== Newcastle Pew ===
In 1725–26 a brick extension, with a slate roof and its own entrance, was added to the south side of the church. The extension contains a remarkable family chamber pew built to Sir John Vanbrugh’s design for the 1st Duke of Newcastle, who had purchased Vanbrugh's nearby country house, Claremont, and therefore worshipped at St George's, as did Newcastle's brother, Henry Pelham of Esher Place. Connected to the body of the church through a bay in the south wall, the pew has a temple front of eight Corinthian columns and pilasters surmounted by a pediment of pine. The Georgian interior of the pew was later divided into two sets of three boxes, the inhabitants of Claremont sitting on the right, and those of Esher Place on the left, each with their own fireplace. Vanbrugh also replaced the Tudor windows of the church with those of Georgian style: the only remaining stained glass window was removed to the Great Hall of Wadham College, Oxford. George II’s royal coat of arms hangs from the chancel beam.

The Duke of Newcastle's successors at Claremont would all have worshipped at St George's at some time. These include Princess Charlotte, only child of George IV and heiress presumptive to the throne, who died at Claremont; her husband Prince Leopold of Saxe-Coburg, later first King of the Belgians; his niece by marriage, the young Princess Victoria; her youngest son Leopold; and Princess Alice, Countess of Athlone. A sculpted triptych memorial to Charlotte and Leopold, commissioned in 1870 from Francis John Williamson by Queen Victoria and originally in their former home, Claremont, stands at the west end of the north aisle.

== St George’s today ==
After Christ Church was built, St George's fell into some disrepair, but it was restored by the community in 1965, and remains a consecrated building, now in the care of the Churches Conservation Trust and supported locally by the Friends of St George's Church. St George's is not open every day, but several services are held each year. It can also be visited on Saturday mornings during the summer, and is a periodic venue for music and the arts. The church may be visited by borrowing a key from an adjacent property (Monday to Saturday inclusive).

== See also ==
- List of places of worship in Elmbridge
