= Hundred of Elmbridge =

Historical division of Surrey, England

Coordinates: 51.37°N 0.40°W

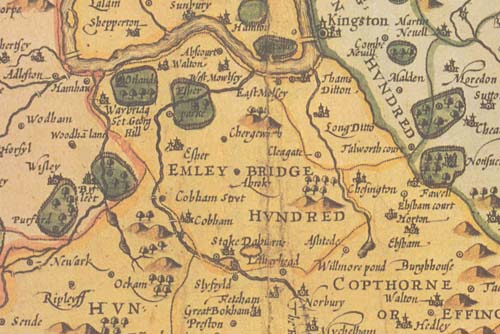
Elmbridge is in the north of the hundreds of Surrey

The Hundred of Elmbridge or Elmbridge/Emley Hundred was a geographic subdivision (called a "hundred") in the north of the county of Surrey, England. The majority of its area forms the modern Borough of Elmbridge, with the remainder forming part of the Royal Borough of Kingston upon Thames in Greater London.

== History ==
Elmbridge appears in the Domesday Book of 1086 as Amelebrige an area used for strategic, secular purposes with a Hundred Court where local wealthy and powerful figures met about once a month. It also had in early centuries a small number of owners who attempted to charge and collect rent of all of the owners of the main manageable medieval asset in the country, the manors.

=== Etymology ===
The name refers to a bridge over the River Mole, which was originally called the River Emel or Amele, a word possibly meaning 'misty' and later had the alternate form Emlyn; the bridge may have been between Hersham and Esher and specifically close to the crossing of today's A244 road.

Elmbridge's name thus did not derive from elm trees which appeared on the Surbiton Urban District Council municipal arms and continue in the Elmbridge municipal arms.

=== Scope ===
Parishes within the hundred were:

- Cobham
- Esher
- East and West Molesey (the divide occurred during the heyday of the hundred's economic significance).
- Stoke D'Abernon
- Thames Ditton (part containing the manors of Imber Court and Weston which with common land formed/forms Weston Green)
- Walton-on-Thames
- Weybridge

At times it also included:

- Tolworth and Chessington.

Surbiton had an elm tree on its crest as its area once lay within the Elmbridge hundred.

=== Use and decline ===
Its economic unity was shattered like most hundreds given the rise of smaller manors and newer manors which came to form the main, manageable agricultural asset throughout the country. It occupied just less than the central to north-west twelfth of the county.

The Victoria County History collated the medieval documents such as feet of fines and using these supports a date of about 1200, which would tie it in the grant of a liberty by King John, as when it passed to the borough of Kingston to be held "at fee farm" being kept farmed and free from (land that was never cultivatable, termed waste). In 1280 it was said to be in the hands of their tenant Reginald de Imworth, with whose manor of Imworth it descended until 1499, when Richard Ardern died seised of the manor of Imworth and half the hundred, held of (i.e. under and subject to a rent to) the men of Kingston. Within the hundred there were several exempt jurisdictions. In 1253 John D'Abernon was successful in his claim to view of frankpledge in Stoke D'Abernon, and Avelina, daughter of Geoffrey de Cruce and wife of Roger de Legh, also claimed the right in Walton.

In a Subsidy Roll of about 1334 the area was valued at £24 0s. 6d, although it is not clear if this was a collective tax demand figure of the manors of the hundred.
