= Martin Brunt =

British journalist

Martin Edward Brunt (born Camberley, Surrey, England, on 5 February 1955) is crime correspondent for Sky News. He joined the channel at its launch in 1989.

== Education ==
Brunt was educated at Soham Grammar School, in the small town of Soham in Cambridgeshire, followed by the London College of Printing, where he studied magazine journalism.

== Life and career ==
After leaving the London College of Printing, Brunt first joined the editorial staff of Power Laundry and Cleaning News, owned by the International Publishing Corporation (IPC) in London.

From there he was taken on as a junior reporter with the Chatham News and Chatham Standard newspapers in Kent and after training under editor Gerald Hinks left to join a news agency in Devon, followed by the Ferrari Agency in Dartford, Kent. From there he moved to the Sunday Mirror and became chief reporter before being asked to join Sky News.

Early exclusive coverage included the Iraqis' retreat from Kuwait in the first Gulf War.

Brunt reported from South Africa on the murder inquiry into "Adam", an unknown boy whose torso was found in the River Thames in 2001.

He has a reputation for gaining insider information: Hugo Rifkind reported in The Times diary of 22 December 2006:

"High praise for the Sky News crime correspondent Martin Brunt. When a hack from (another) newspaper phoned Suffolk Police press office with a query on the serial killer case, he was told: 'Call Martin Brunt. He knows everything before we do.' A little concerning."

Brunt was the first to report the arrest of Amy Winehouse, and the resignation of Sir Ian Blair as Metropolitan Police commissioner, and was the first to interview Robert Murat, then suspected of involvement in the disappearance of Madeleine McCann. His contacts also led to Sky News being the first to report that the 7 July events in London were the work of terrorists and allowed Sky News to break the news of the death of the Queen Mother. In 2010, Brunt reported live from Rothbury during the police hunt for gunman Raoul Moat.

In October 2014, Brunt was the journalist involved in revealing the identity of Brenda Leyland, who had posted comments concerning the McCann investigation on social media. Following the revelation and a report to Leicestershire Police, Brunt and a camera crew confronted Leyland at her home. Following the confrontation Leyland was later found dead in a hotel, leading to a call on a Facebook group for Brunt to be sacked. Two days before Leyland's death she told Brunt in a phone call "I was thinking of ending it all, but I’ve had a glass of wine and I’m feeling better now". Brunt did not inform anyone over this remark, because he said that it appeared to be a throwaway remark.

Brunt briefly became an internet sensation in August 2016, for a Sky news report at St James' Church in Weybridge, following the murder of a French priest, Jacques Hamel, by an ISIS terrorist. Brunt was widely mocked for walking out of the church saying "If I was a terrorist, I could've killed them all". This led to multiple news reports and social media comments ridiculing the reporter.

== Bibliography ==
- No One Got Cracked Over the Head for No Reason Dispatches from a Crime Reporter (London: Biteback Publishing, 2023) ISBN 9781785907784
