= St James' Church, Weybridge =

Anglican church in Weybridge, England

St James' Church
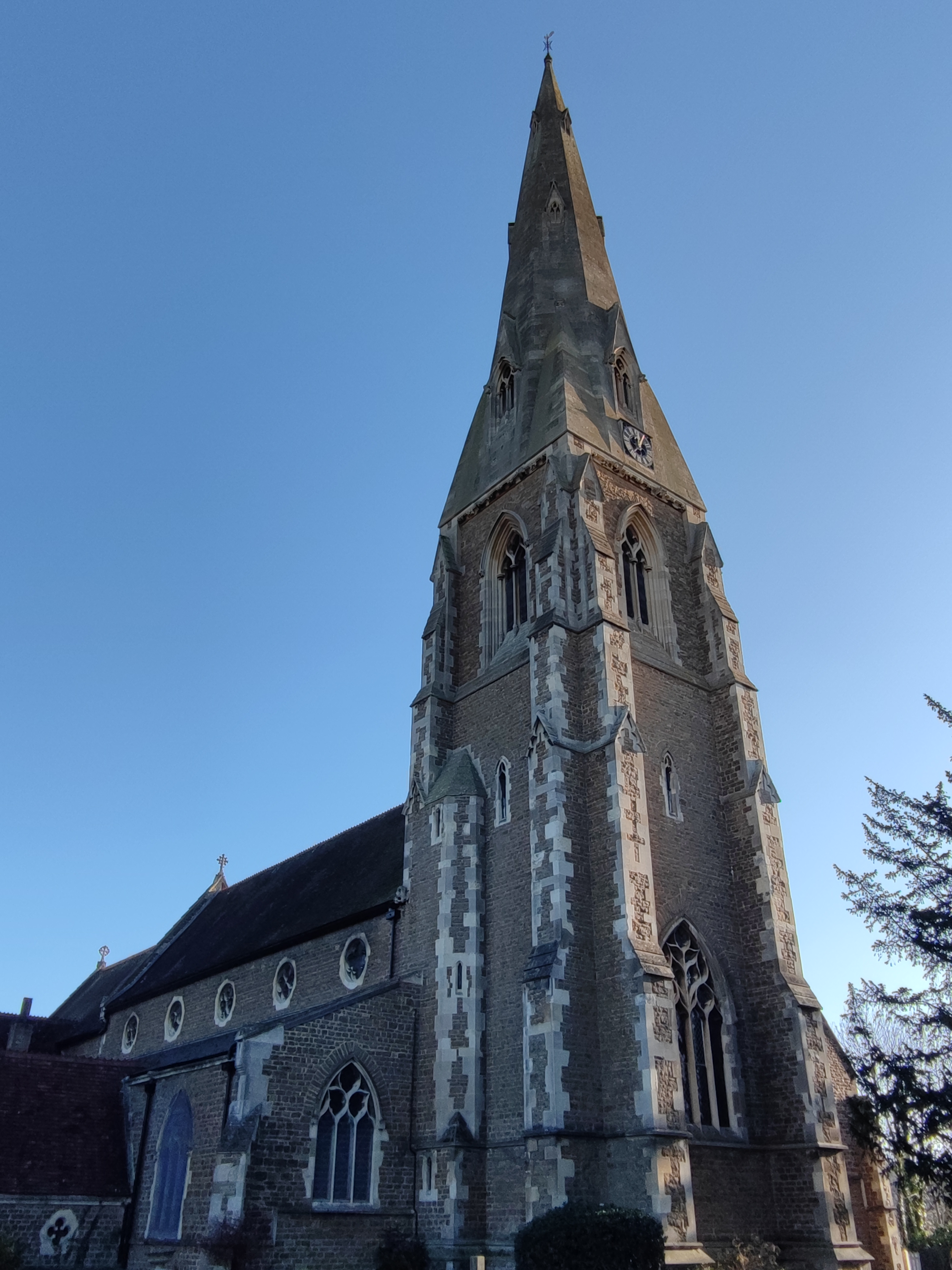
- The church in 2025.
- St James' Church
- OS grid reference: TQ 07221 64736
- Address: Church Street, Weybridge, KT13 8DN
- Country: England
- Denomination: Church of England
- Website: www.stjamesweybridge.org.uk/about-us/

Architecture
- Architect: John Loughborough Pearson
- Architectural type: Gothic Revival
- Years built: 1848–1889

Specifications
- Capacity: 300

Clergy
- Priest: Revd Father Damian Harrison-Miles

Listed Building – Grade II*
- Official name: Church of St James
- Designated: 19 October 1951
- Reference no.: 1188363

St James' Church is a Grade II* listed Anglican church on Church Street in Weybridge, Surrey, England. It was built by John Loughborough Pearson in 1848–1889. The church's notable spire has lent it the nickname "Cathedral of the Thames Valley".

== History ==
The current edifice was preceded by a medieval church, the church of St Nicholas, which is believed to have been erected between 666 and 1175, potentially at the time of the Norman Conquest. It was linked to Chertsey Abbey before the Reformation.

St James' church was built in its place in 1848 by John Loughborough Pearson, architect of Truro Cathedral, in the Gothic Revival style. The construction was carried out in four major phases:

- The nave with its north and south aisles, the bell tower, and chancel, in 1848
- The addition of the spire in 1855
- The addition of the outer south aisle in 1864, today known as All Souls Chapel
- The extension of the chancel eastwards in 1889.

The Parish Centre, a large hall adjoining the church to the south, was built in 1966 by B & N Westwood, Piet & Partners, and extended in 1977. The building contains a hall with a stage and kitchen, a smaller dividable hall with a kitchen and toilets, and the parish office.

In 2016, the church was noted in a report on terrorism targeting churches by Sky News journalist Martin Brunt, following the murder of Father Jacques Hamel in Saint-Étienne-du-Rouvray, France, during the 2016 Normandy church attack. Brunt walked out of St James' Church and infamously declared: "There are about a dozen worshippers in there and one priest. If I was a terrorist, I could've killed them all."

The church offered refuge to evacuated residents following the Weybridge Community Hospital fire in 2017.

The Parish Centre hosted an event by Surrey County Council on 6 June 2025 to announce to residents the renovation of the local library, today known as the Weybridge Library Hub.

== Architecture ==
The building comprises a nave, a chancel to the east, aisles to the north and south, and an additional south aisle. The masonry is made up of Bargate stone with Bath stone dressings.

Inside, the floor of the chancel is made up of over 20 types of coloured marble, and the walls of gold and red mosaics. Memorials from the previous church are displayed inside, at the base of the tower.

Glass doors were installed to the north and south porches in 2003, and in 2007, a new lighting scheme was installed inside.

== Current use ==
St James' worships today in the liberal catholic tradition. It holds weekly services on Sundays: a said Eucharist at 8 am, and a sung Parish Eucharist at 10 am. There is also a said Eucharist every Wednesday at 11 am.

There are around 240 seats available for regular congregations, with 60 further additional chairs stored for an overall capacity of 300. The choir stalls can sit 30, bringing the total seat capacity for concerts at 330.

The church hosts the Runnymede Foodbank on Thursday afternoons. The Parish Centre holds Sunday School, Sunday Crêche, Brownies and the St James’ Handbell Ringers. The church is maintained and preserved by Friends of St James', a local association.

== Burials ==
- Thomas Hapson (died 1717)
- Lydia Maplesloft (died 1765)
- George Mangles (died 1810)
- Princess Frederica Charlotte of Prussia (died 1820)

== Gallery ==
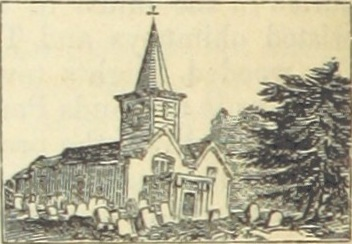
Image of the medieval church, pre-1846.

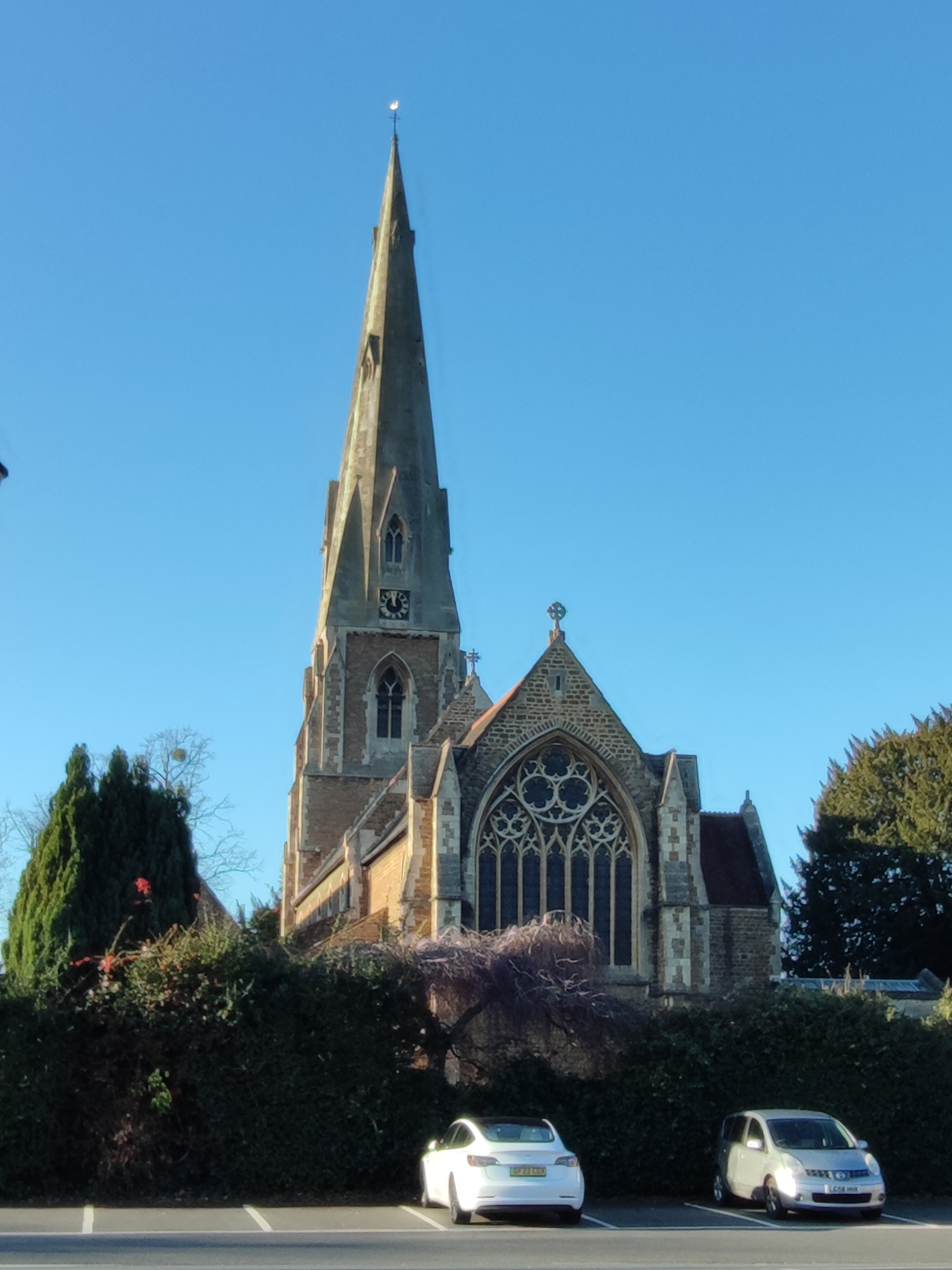
The east end of the church viewed from Churchfield Road car park.
