= Stoke d'Abernon =

Village and parish in Surrey, England

Coordinates: 51°19′15″N 0°23′09″W

- Village
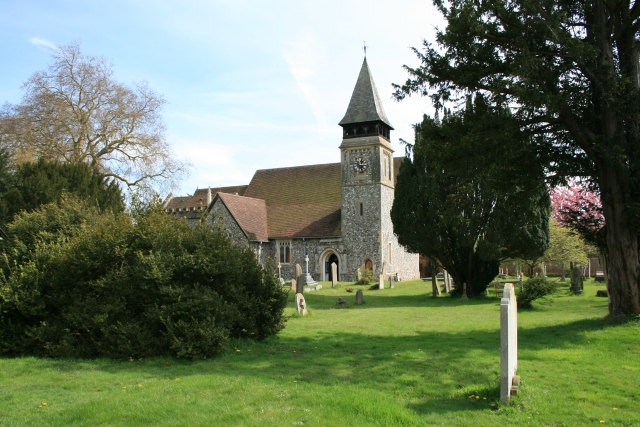
- St Mary's church dates to before the Norman Conquest and is a Grade I listed building

- Location within Surrey
- Area: 3.59 km^{2} (1.39 sq mi)
- Population: 1,693 (2011 census)
  - Density: 472/km^{2} (1,220/sq mi)
- OS grid reference: TQ127589
- District: Elmbridge
- Shire county: Surrey
- Region: South East
- Country: England
- Sovereign state: United Kingdom
- Post town: Cobham
- Postcode district: KT11
- Dialling code: 01932
- Police: Surrey
- Fire: Surrey
- Ambulance: South East Coast
- UK Parliament: Runnymede and Weybridge

Stoke d'Abernon (/ˈdæbərnən/) is a village and former civil parish in the Elmbridge district, in Surrey, England. It is on the right bank of the River Mole and lies south of Cobham and southeast of Oxshott. It shares a railway station with Cobham and is inside the M25 motorway. Cobham Training Centre, the training ground of Chelsea F.C., is within its traditional boundaries.

== History ==
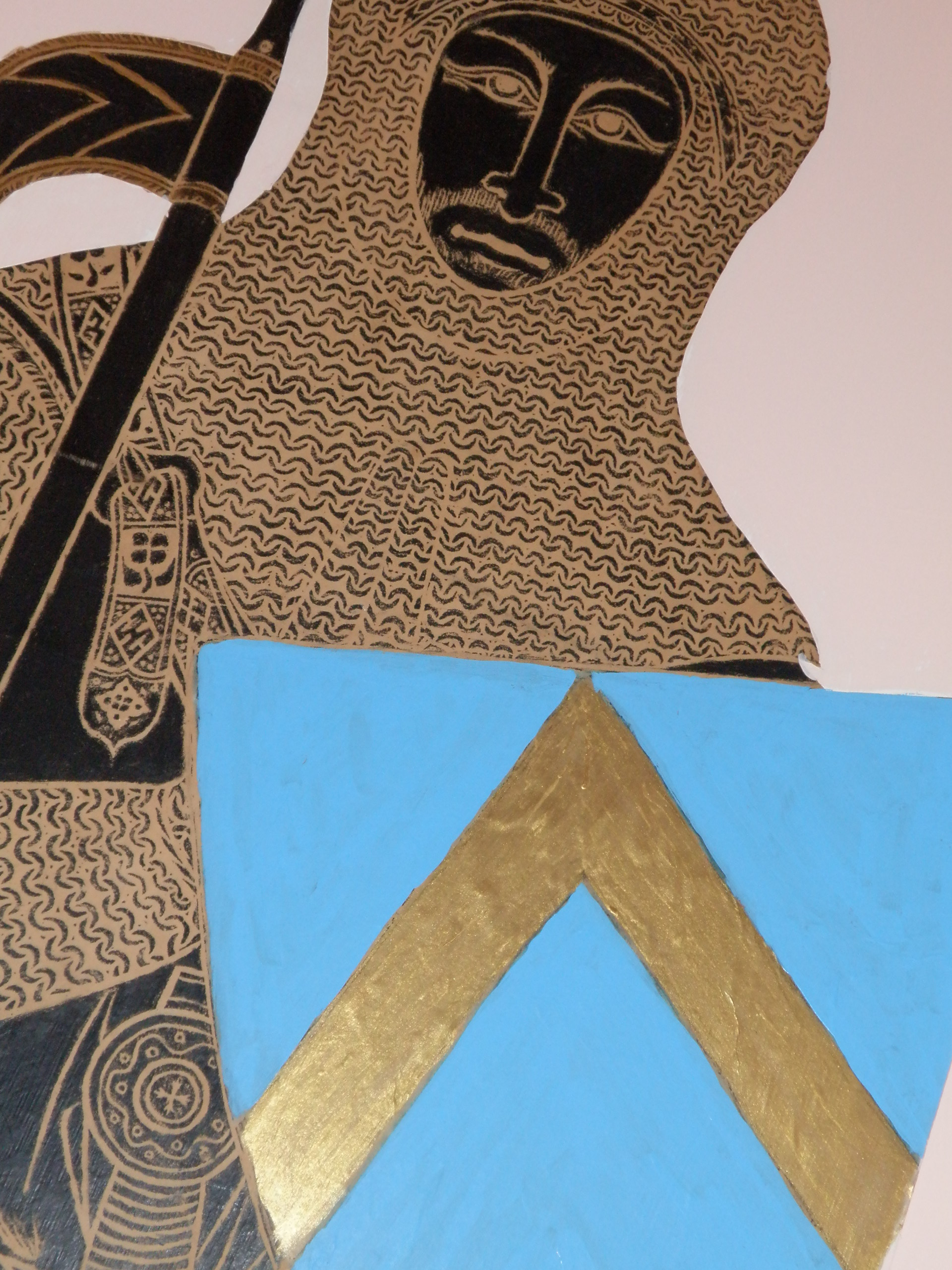
Artist's rejuvenation of work of life-size brass with enamel in the parish church

Stoke D'Abernon appears in the Domesday Book of 1086 as the manor of Stoche (derived from the common Anglo-Saxon word stoc, implying a holy place). Its assets were: 2 hides, 2 virgates and 5 acres (making about 1.11 km^{2} in all); 1 church, 2 mills worth 13s, 4 ploughs, 6 oxen, 4 acres (1.6 ha) of meadow, woodland worth 40 hogs. It rendered £5 per year to its feudal system overlords.

During the reign of Edward the Confessor, the manor was held by his servant, Bricsi Cild. Following the Norman Conquest of England in 1066, William the Conqueror granted the manor to his kinsman, Richard fitz Gilbert, who also received the lordship of Clare.

The suffix "D'Abernon" comes from the surname of another Norman nobleman, Sir Roger D'Aubernoun, who was also granted land in Surrey in return for his services to William. At some point after 1086, the de Clare family granted the manor of Stoche to the D'Aubernoun family, who likely originated from the parish of Abernon, near Orbec. The D'Aubernoun family held it until the mid-14th century. Two descendants of Sir Roger, Sir John D'Aubernoun the Elder (died 1277) and his son Sir John the Younger (died 1327) are buried in the village; there are monumental brasses of them in St Mary's Church, with the one of Sir John the Elder believed to be the oldest in England.

Until the mid-19th century, Stoke D'Abernon lay in the hundred of Elmbridge, which gave its name to the modern-day borough. Today, the village forms part of the Oxshott & Stoke D'Abernon ward of the borough.

In 1951 the civil parish had a population of 2211. On 1 April 1974 the parish was abolished.

== Amenities and landmarks ==
It has a railway station, named Cobham & Stoke D'Abernon to attract custom from the much larger village of Cobham which starts contiguously 0.5 miles (0.8 km) to the north. It has been so named since its 1885 opening.

In the east, on the main road to Leatherhead, is the Woodlands Park Hotel, the top of which is tile-hung in the Surrey style. A single-storey bay has a terracotta balustrade above, and the building has a half-timbered gable end front bay. Built in 1890, it is a relatively modern listed building, designed by Rowland Plumbe. The local pub-restaurant is The Old Plough which dates to the 16th century.

The village has an active residents' association with a network of road representatives, but like those of neighbouring Cobham and Oxshott, and unlike similar groups in the rest of Elmbridge, it does not contest elections.

The church, St Mary's, is Saxon with Norman and Victorian additions, and is famous for its monumental brasses, among them the oldest in the country. It is Surrey's oldest church, is still active, and is Grade I listed.

=== Sports ===
Since 2005 the village has been home to the training ground of Premier League football club Chelsea.

Stoke D'Abernon Cricket Club was formed in 1870 and currently plays in the Surrey Championship.

== Education ==
Parkside Preparatory School is an independent prep school at the grade II* listed manor house adjacent to the parish church of St. Mary and was founded in 1879.

== Administration ==
The Surrey County Councillor is shared with Cobham.

== Notable people ==
William Marshal, who was regent of England (1217–1219) and first 'Lord Marshal', spent his honeymoon here in the summer of 1189 with his new wife, Isabelle de Clare. His descendant the Earl Marshal was one of two hereditary peers (the other being the Lord Great Chamberlain) not subject to an election who were entitled to sit in the House of Lords: this position was revoked by the House of Lords Act in 2026.

Yehudi Menuhin (whose full title was Baron Menuhin of Stoke D'Abernon in the County of Surrey) founded his music school to the south of the village.

The distinguished diplomat Edgar Vincent (1857–1941) lived within the parish in the early 20th century and was the first recipient of the D'Abernon Viscountcy and Barony. The title died with its first holder.

The England Test cricketer and captain, Bob Willis, grew up in the village and learnt to play at several local village clubs, including Stoke D'Abernon cricket club, before his professional career in the 1970s and 80s.

== Demography and housing ==
2011 Census Homes
Output area	Detached	Semi-detached	Terraced	Flats and apartments	Caravans/temporary/mobile homes	Shared between households
Stoke D'Abernon (Note: Elmbridge 018C)	593	140	29	44	0	0

The average level of accommodation in the region composed of detached houses was 28%, the average that was apartments was 22.6%.

2011 Census Key Statistics
Output area	Population	Households	% Owned outright	% Owned with a loan	hectares
Stoke D'Abernon	1,693	637	41.4%	37.5%	359

The proportion of households in the settlement who owned their home outright compares to the regional average of 35.1%. The proportion who owned their home with a loan compares to the regional average of 32.5%. The remaining % is made up of rented dwellings (plus a negligible % of households living rent-free).

The 2021 Census does not give statistics at the village level.

== Gallery ==
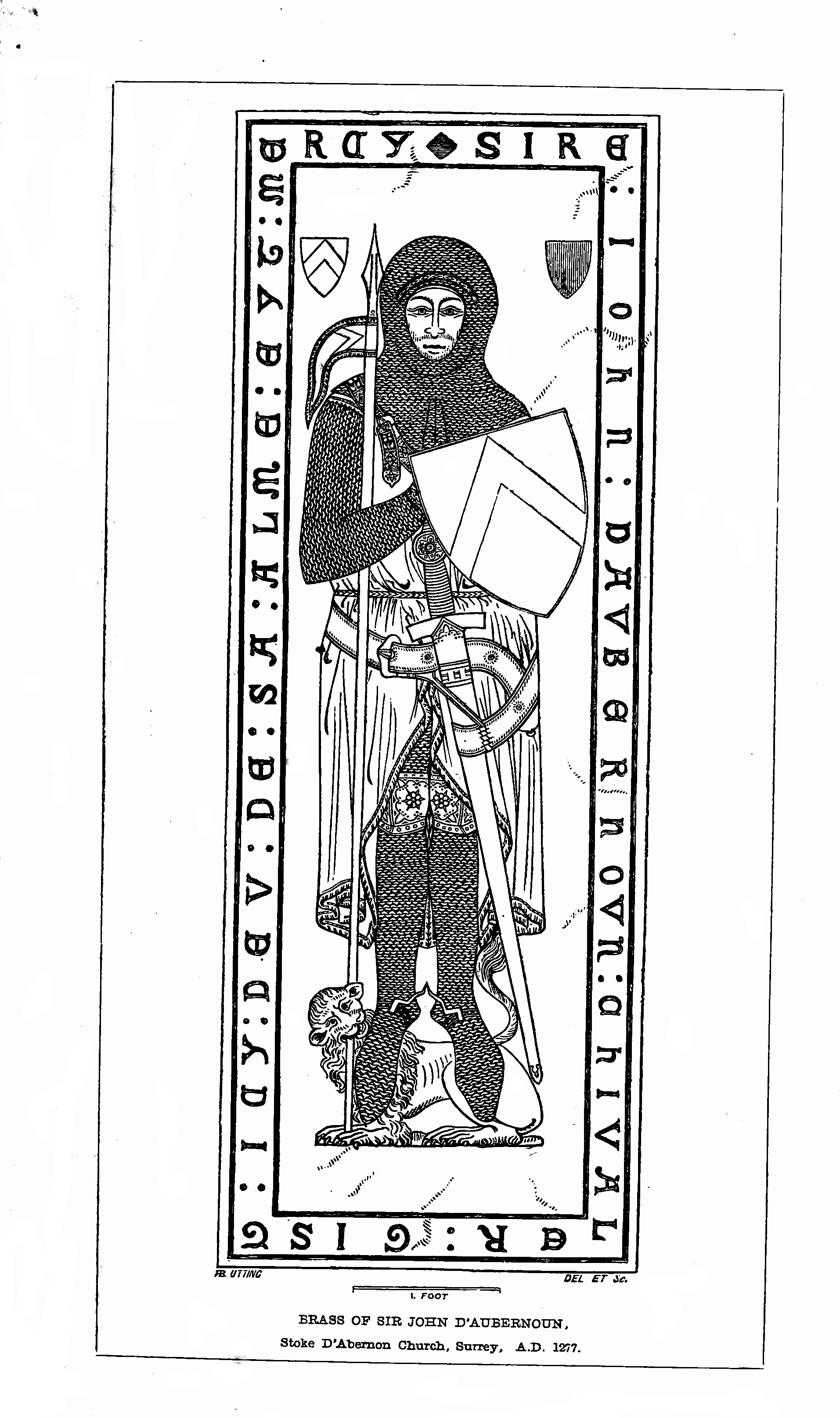
Brass of Sir John D'Aubernoun, the elder

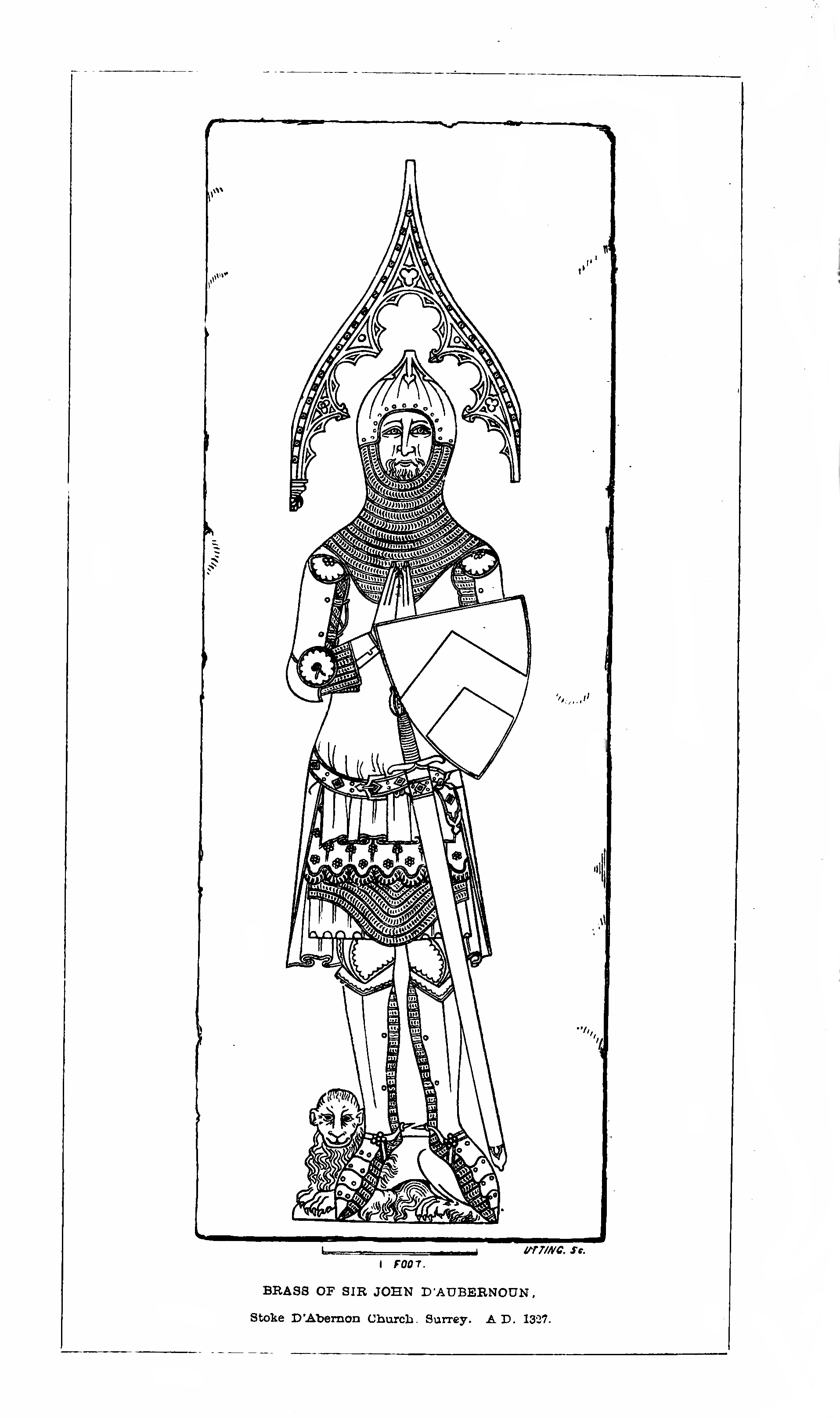
Brass of Sir John D'Aubernoun, the younger

== See also ==
- Yehudi Menuhin, Baron Menuhin of Stoke D'Abernon in the County of Surrey

== Notes and references ==
Notes
