= Elmbridge Borough Council elections =

Local government elections in Surrey, England

Elmbridge Borough Council elections were held on a four-year cycle with a third of the council elected, followed by one year without election. Elmbridge Borough Council is the local authority for the non-metropolitan district of the Borough of Elmbridge, in Surrey, in South East England. The council is due to be abolished on 1 April 2027 following structural changes to local government in Surrey.

== Council elections ==
- 1973 Elmbridge Borough Council election
- 1976 Elmbridge Borough Council election (New ward boundaries)
- 1979 Elmbridge Borough Council election
- 1980 Elmbridge Borough Council election
- 1982 Elmbridge Borough Council election
- 1983 Elmbridge Borough Council election
- 1984 Elmbridge Borough Council election
- 1986 Elmbridge Borough Council election (Borough boundary changes took place but the number of seats remained the same)
- 1987 Elmbridge Borough Council election
- 1988 Elmbridge Borough Council election
- 1990 Elmbridge Borough Council election
- 1991 Elmbridge Borough Council election
- 1992 Elmbridge Borough Council election
- 1994 Elmbridge Borough Council election
- 1995 Elmbridge Borough Council election (Borough boundary changes took place but the number of seats remained the same)
- 1996 Elmbridge Borough Council election
- 1998 Elmbridge Borough Council election
- 1999 Elmbridge Borough Council election
- 2000 Elmbridge Borough Council election (New ward boundaries)
- 2002 Elmbridge Borough Council election
- 2003 Elmbridge Borough Council election
- 2004 Elmbridge Borough Council election
- 2006 Elmbridge Borough Council election
- 2007 Elmbridge Borough Council election
- 2008 Elmbridge Borough Council election
- 2010 Elmbridge Borough Council election
- 2011 Elmbridge Borough Council election
- 2012 Elmbridge Borough Council election
- 2014 Elmbridge Borough Council election
- 2015 Elmbridge Borough Council election
- 2016 Elmbridge Borough Council election (New ward boundaries)
- 2018 Elmbridge Borough Council election
- 2019 Elmbridge Borough Council election
- 2021 Elmbridge Borough Council election
- 2022 Elmbridge Borough Council election
- 2023 Elmbridge Borough Council election
- 2024 Elmbridge Borough Council election

== Results maps ==
2002 results map

2003 results map

2004 results map

2006 results map

2007 results map

2008 results map

2010 results map

2011 results map

2012 results map

2014 results map

2015 results map

2016 results map

2018 results map

2019 results map

2021 results map

2022 results map

2023 results map

2024 results map

== By-election results ==
=== 1994-1998 ===
Oxshott & Stoke d'Abernon By-Election 1 May 1997
Party	Candidate	Votes	%	±%
Conservative		2,358	75.4	+4.8
Labour		770	24.6	+13.0
Majority		1,588	50.8	
Turnout		3,128		
Conservative hold		Swing		

Molesey South By-Election 4 December 1997
Party	Candidate	Votes	%	±%
Labour		403	37.5	+6.8
Liberal Democrats		257	23.9	−8.3
Independent		231	21.5	−8.3
Conservative		183	17.0	+9.6
Majority		146	13.6	
Turnout		1,074	22.5	
Labour gain from Liberal Democrats		Swing		

=== 2002-2006 ===
Hersham South By-Election 5 May 2005
Party	Candidate	Votes	%	±%
Conservative		1,395	45.4	
Independent		773	25.1	
Liberal Democrats		488	15.9	
Labour		418	13.6	
Majority		622	20.3	
Turnout		2,301	65.1	
Conservative hold		Swing		

Weybridge South By-Election 5 May 2005
Party	Candidate	Votes	%	±%
Conservative		1,162	60.0	−3.1
Liberal Democrats		573	29.6	−1.0
Labour		203	10.4	+4.1
Majority		589	30.4	
Turnout		1,938	62.6	
Conservative hold		Swing		

=== 2006-2010 ===
Walton Central By-Election 24 August 2006
Party	Candidate	Votes	%	±%
Independent	Donagh Curwen	656	50.0	−2.7
Conservative	Christopher Elmer	482	36.7	+5.1
Liberal Democrats	Sereena Hirst	115	8.8	−0.1
Labour	Rosemary McCormac	59	4.5	−2.2
Majority		174	13.3	
Turnout		1,312	28.8	
Independent hold		Swing		

Claygate By-Election 22 March 2007
Party	Candidate	Votes	%	±%
Liberal Democrats	Jack Saltman	744	49.7	−3.6
Conservative	Geoffrey Herbert	645	43.1	−0.2
UKIP	Bernard Collignon	63	4.2	+4.2
Labour	Robert King	44	2.9	−0.6
Majority		99	6.6	
Turnout		1,496	29.7	
Liberal Democrats hold		Swing		

Walton Ambleside By-Election 9 August 2007
Party	Candidate	Votes	%	±%
Conservative	Christopher Elmer	310	45.5	−2.6
The Walton Society	Barbara Cobbett	252	37.0	+5.6
Labour	Peter Hawkes	60	8.8	−1.2
UKIP	Bill Botting	33	4.8	+4.8
Liberal Democrats	Sereena Davey	26	3.8	−6.7
Majority		58	8.5	
Turnout		681	23.3	
Conservative hold		Swing		

Cobham Fairmile By-Election 29 November 2007
Party	Candidate	Votes	%	±%
Conservative	Paul Tweedle	418	74.6	+0.4
Liberal Democrats	Simon Lumb	45	8.0	−9.3
Labour	Marian Holmes	38	6.8	−1.7
Independent	Anthony Lopinto	32	5.7	+5.7
Independent	Paul Collins	18	3.2	+3.2
Monster Raving Loony	"Chinners"	9	1.6	+1.6
Majority		373	66.6	
Turnout		560	17.9	
Conservative hold		Swing		

Esher By-Election 5 June 2009
Party	Candidate	Votes	%	±%
Conservative	Tim Oliver	1032	50	
Esher Residents Association	Joan Leifer	964	47	
Labour	Sheila Francis	68	3	
Majority		68	3	
Turnout		2064	44	
Conservative hold		Swing		

=== 2010-2014 ===
Hersham North By-Election 21 October 2010 for one councillor whose term expired 2012
Party	Candidate	Votes	%	±%
Conservative	Simon Desborough	463	44	
Independent	Roy Green	453	43	
Labour	Peter Jepson	135	13	
Majority		10	0.95%	
Turnout		1501	31	
Conservative hold		Swing		

St George's Hill By-Election 21 October 2010 for one councillor whose term expired 2011
Party	Candidate	Votes	%	±%
Independent	Peter Harman	515	53	
Conservative	Melissa Lake	412	43	
Labour	Robert Evans	36	4	
Majority		103	10	
Turnout		681	23.3	
St George's Hill Independents hold		Swing		

Esher By-Election 21 June 2012 for one councillor whose term expires 2016
Party	Candidate	Votes	%	±%
Conservative	Tim Oliver	711	47	
Esher Residents Association	Gary Lay	665	44	
Labour	Peter Hawkes	90	6	
UKIP	Denis Hill	31	2	
Majority		46	3	
Turnout		1501	31	
Conservative hold		Swing		

Claygate By-Election 3 May 2013
Party	Candidate	Votes	%	±%
Liberal Democrats	Mary Marshall	1046	52	
Conservative	Mark Sugden	732	36	
UKIP	Bernard Collignon	239	12	
Majority		314	16	
Turnout		2022	38	
Liberal Democrats hold		Swing		

Weybridge South By-Election 25 July 2013
Party	Candidate	Votes	%	±%
Conservative	Richard Knight	274	48.6	−20.9
Liberal Democrats	Gillian Solway	150	26.6	+7.8
UKIP	Ian Lake	140	24.8	+24.8
Majority		124	22.0	
Turnout		564	38	
Conservative hold		Swing		

=== 2014-2018 ===
Long Ditton By-Election 23 July 2015
Party	Candidate	Votes	%	±%
Liberal Democrats	Neil Houston	770	50.6	+4.3
Conservative	Hugh Evans	611	40.2	−4.7
Green	Laura Harmour	79	5.2	+5.2
UKIP	Susannah Cunningham	61	4.0	−4.9
Majority		159	10.5	
Turnout		1,521		
Liberal Democrats hold		Swing		

=== 2018-2022 ===
Oxshott and Stoke D'Abernon By-Election 12 July 2018
Party	Candidate	Votes	%	±%
Conservative	David Lewis	1,297	72.0	−4.7
Liberal Democrats	Dorothy Ford	463	25.7	+9.7
UKIP	Nicholas Wood	42	2.3	+0.1
Majority		834	46.3	
Turnout		1,802		
Conservative hold		Swing		

Cobham and Downside By-Election 1 July 2021
Party	Candidate	Votes	%	±%
Liberal Democrats	Robin Stephens	890	49.8	
Conservative	Corinne Sterry	778	43.5	
Green	Laura Harmour	54	3.0	
Labour	Irene Threlkeld	47	2.6	
Reform	Elaine Kingston	19	1.1	
Majority		112	6.3	
Turnout		1,788		
Liberal Democrats gain from Conservative		Swing		

=== 2022-2026 ===
Molesey East By-Election 2 November 2023
Party	Candidate	Votes	%	±%
Liberal Democrats	Kevin Whincup	694	36.1	−6.5
Conservative	Freddie Ingle	627	32.6	+11.4
Residents	Pat Gormley	523	27.2	−4.5
Green	Andrew Dillon	77	4.0	+4.0
Majority		67	3.5	
Turnout		1,921		
Liberal Democrats gain from Residents		Swing		

Cobham and Downside By-Election 4 July 2024
Party	Candidate	Votes	%	±%
Conservative	Katerina Lusk	2,056	49.9	+4.1
Liberal Democrats	Diane Leakey	1,566	38.0	−2.3
Labour	Irene Threlkeld	348	8.5	+3.4
UKIP	Nicholas Wood	148	3.6	+3.6
Majority		490	11.9	
Turnout		4,118		
Conservative gain from Liberal Democrats		Swing		

Hersham Village By-Election 10 October 2024
Party	Candidate	Votes	%	±%
Conservative	John O'Reilly	1,029	55.4	+11.2
Liberal Democrats	Varsha Khodiyar	736	39.6	−9.7
Labour	Francis Eldergill	94	5.1	−1.4
Majority		293	15.8	
Turnout		1,859		
Conservative gain from Liberal Democrats		Swing		

Weybridge St George's Hill By-Election 10 October 2024
Party	Candidate	Votes	%	±%
Conservative	Colin McFarlane	608	46.0	+16.7
Residents	Andrew Kelly	598	45.2	−7.8
Green	Brittany Johansson	116	8.8	+1.1
Majority		10	0.8	
Turnout		1,322		
Conservative hold		Swing		
