= 2011 Elmbridge Borough Council election =

Local election in Surrey, UK

Results of the 2011 Elmbridge Borough Council election

Elections to Elmbridge Borough Council were held on 5 May 2011, alongside other local elections across the United Kingdom. 20 seats (one third) of the council were up for election. Following the election the council remained under Conservative control.

== Results summary ==
2011 Elmbridge Borough Council election
| Party | Seats Before | Change | Seats After |
|---|---|---|---|
| Conservative Party | 33 | ▲2 | 35 |
| Liberal Democrats | 7 | ▼2 | 5 |
| Others | 20 | Steady | 20 |

== See also ==
- Elmbridge Borough Council elections
