= 2019 Elmbridge Borough Council election =

2019 UK local government election

Results of the 2019 Elmbridge Borough Council election

The by-thirds 2019 Elmbridge Borough Council election took place on 2 May 2019 to elect members of Elmbridge Borough Council in England. This was on the same day as other local elections.

== Ward results ==
=== Claygate ===
Claygate
Party	Candidate	Votes	%	±%
Liberal Democrats	Alex Coomes	1,429	63.0	+6.7
Conservative	Mark Sugden	775	34.2	−4.8
Labour	Sean Byrne	65	2.9	−1.9
Majority				
Turnout		2,269	42.0	
Liberal Democrats hold		Swing		

=== Cobham & Downside ===
Cobham & Downside
Party	Candidate	Votes	%	±%
Conservative	Dorothy Mitchell	902	47.4	−19.0
Liberal Democrats	David Bellchamber	598	31.4	+17.5
UKIP	Elaine Kingston	238	12.5	+5.9
Labour	Hugh Bryant	166	8.7	−4.4
Majority				
Turnout		1,904	30.3	
Conservative hold		Swing		

=== Esher ===
Esher
Party	Candidate	Votes	%	±%
Residents	Richard Williams*	1,138	46.7	+10.5
Conservative	Richard John	965	39.6	−9.6
Green	Laura Harmour	222	9.1	+2.6
Labour	Susan Dennis	113	4.6	−3.4
Majority				
Turnout		2,438	37.7	
Residents gain from Conservative		Swing		

*stood as Esher Residents Association.

=== Hersham Village ===
Hersham Village
Party	Candidate	Votes	%	±%
Conservative	Mary Sheldon	1,177	52.8	+4.0
Hersham Village Society	Sam Thompson	780	35.0	+7.9
Labour	Julie Crook	271	12.2	−1.1
Majority				
Turnout		2,228	35.5	
Conservative hold		Swing		

=== Hinchley Wood & Weston Green ===
Hinchley Wood & Weston Green
Party	Candidate	Votes	%	±%
Hinchley Wood Residents' Association	Janet Turner	1,766	73.6	+3.3
Liberal Democrats	Liz Ambekar	360	15.0	+5.6
Conservative	Geoff Herbert	272	11.3	−6.1
Majority				
Turnout		2,398	38.0	
Hinchley Wood Residents' Association hold		Swing		

=== Long Ditton ===
Long Ditton
Party	Candidate	Votes	%	±%
Liberal Democrats	Neil Houston	1,194	57.8	+12.0
Conservative	Claudia Riley-Hards	757	36.7	−8.8
Labour	John Fryer	114	5.5	−3.2
Majority				
Turnout		2,065	39.5	
Liberal Democrats hold		Swing		

=== Molesey East ===
Molesey East
Party	Candidate	Votes	%	±%
Molesey Residents' Association	Lesley Yauner	1,268	48.0	+11.3
Conservative	Xingang Wang	790	29.9	−16.9
Liberal Democrats	Susan Fergy	252	9.5	N/A
Green	Lisa Howard	208	7.9	+1.5
Labour	Rosie Rendall	125	4.7	−4.6
Majority				
Turnout		2,643	40.5	
Molesey Residents' Association hold		Swing		

=== Molesey West ===
Molesey West
Party	Candidate	Votes	%	±%
Molesey Residents' Association	Tony Popham	1,211	63.5	+17.0
Conservative	John Gould	295	15.5	−17.7
Liberal Democrats	Alastair Sturgis	227	11.9	+3.8
Labour	David Sheldrake	174	9.1	−3.1
Majority				
Turnout		1,907	28.9	
Molesey Residents' Association hold		Swing		

=== Oatlands & Burwood Park ===
Oatlands & Burwood Park
Party	Candidate	Votes	%	±%
Conservative	Hilary Butler	1,258	60.3	−8.8
Liberal Democrats	Adriana Dredge	405	19.4	+2.5
Green	Annie Connell	315	15.1	N/A
Labour	Angus Rendall	108	5.2	−6.4
Majority				
Turnout		2,086	35.7	
Conservative hold		Swing		

=== Oxshott & Stoke D'Abernon ===
Oxshott & Stoke D'Abernon
Party	Candidate	Votes	%	±%
Conservative	David Lewis	1,480	65.5	−11.2
Liberal Democrats	Dorothy Ford	681	30.2	+14.2
Labour	Christine Bailey	97	4.3	−0.9
Majority				
Turnout		2,258	35.4	
Conservative hold		Swing		

=== Thames Ditton ===
Thames Ditton
Party	Candidate	Votes	%	±%
Thames Ditton & Weston Green Residents' Association	Joanna Randolph	1,577	67.4	+1.8
Liberal Democrats	Jez Langham	340	14.5	+5.7
Conservative	Rory Simpson	284	12.1	−4.9
Labour	Richard Howard	138	5.9	−2.7
Majority				
Turnout		2,339	36.6	
Thames Ditton & Weston Green Residents' Association hold		Swing		

=== Walton Central ===
Walton Central
Party	Candidate	Votes	%	±%
The Walton Society	Graham Woolgar	1,235	57.0	+15.1
Conservative	Kristopher Januszajtis-Neale	723	33.3	−11.9
Labour	Gerry O'Driscoll	210	9.7	−3.2
Majority				
Turnout		2,168	36.8	
The Walton Society hold		Swing		

=== Walton North ===
Walton North
Party	Candidate	Votes	%	±%
Conservative	Rachael Lake	696	46.0	+0.5
Labour	Peter Ashurst	424	28.0	−5.9
Liberal Democrats	Nicholas Gosling	393	26.0	+12.3
Majority				
Turnout				
Conservative hold		Swing		

=== Walton South ===
Walton South
Party	Candidate	Votes	%	±%
Conservative	Chris Cross	1,048	50.8	−3.9
Liberal Democrats	Margaret Hawkes	727	35.3	+4.5
Labour	Vera-Anne Anderson	286	13.9	−0.5
Majority				
Turnout		2,061	31.5	
Conservative hold		Swing		

=== Weybridge Riverside ===
Weybridge Riverside
Party	Candidate	Votes	%	±%
Liberal Democrats	Ashley Tilling	1,101	47.6	+8.3
Conservative	Paul Wood	955	41.3	+4.2
Labour Co-op	Warren Weertman	140	6.1	−2.4
UKIP	Nicholas Wood	116	5.0	+3.3
Majority				
Turnout		2,312	39.5	
Liberal Democrats gain from Conservative		Swing		

=== Weybridge St. George's Hall ===
Weybridge St. George's Hall
Party	Candidate	Votes	%	±%
Weybridge & St. George's Independents	Tom Catton	1,201	52.4	+15.7
Conservative	John O'Reilly	907	39.6	−14.5
Labour	Heather Bokota	182	7.9	−1.3
Majority				
Turnout		2,290	36.7	
Weybridge & St. George's Independents gain from Conservative				
