= 2021 Elmbridge Borough Council election =

Local election in Surrey, England

Map showing the results of the 2021 Elmbridge Borough Council election

The 2021 Elmbridge Borough Council election was held on 6 May 2021 to elect members of Elmbridge Borough Council in England. This was on the same day as other local elections. The elections were postponed from May 2020 due to the COVID-19 pandemic.

== Results summary ==
2021 Elmbridge Borough Council election
| Party | This election | | | Full council | | | This election | | |
| Party | Seats | Net | Seats % | Other | Total | Total % | Votes | Votes % | +/− |
|---|---|---|---|---|---|---|---|---|---|
| Conservative | 6 | Steady | 37.5 | 15 | 21 | 44.7 | 15,976 | 39.3 | |
| Residents | 7 | Steady | 43.8 | 10 | 17 | 36.2 | 9,365 | 23.0 | |
| Liberal Democrats | 3 | Steady | 18.8 | 5 | 8 | 17.0 | 10,761 | 26.5 | |
| Independent | 0 | Steady | 0.0 | 1 | 1 | 2.1 | 529 | 1.3 | |
| Labour | 0 | Steady | 0.0 | 0 | 0 | 0.0 | 3,019 | 7.4 | |
| Green | 0 | Steady | 0.0 | 0 | 0 | 0.0 | 826 | 2.0 | |
| UKIP | 0 | Steady | 0.0 | 0 | 0 | 0.0 | 129 | 0.3 | |
| Reform UK | 0 | Steady | 0.0 | 0 | 0 | 0.0 | 56 | 0.1 | |

40.661

== Ward results ==
=== Claygate ===
Claygate
| Party | Candidate | Votes | % | ±% |
|---|---|---|---|---|
| Liberal Democrats | Bruce McDonald | 1,668 | 60.4 | −2.6 |
| Conservative | Wael Aleji | 979 | 35.5 | +1.3 |
| Labour | Hadleigh Moon | 113 | 4.1 | +1.2 |
| Majority | | 689 | 24.9 | |
| Turnout | | 2,786 | 50.3 | |
| Liberal Democrats hold | | Swing | | |

=== Cobham & Downside ===
Cobham & Downside
| Party | Candidate | Votes | % | ±% |
|---|---|---|---|---|
| Conservative | Alistair Mann | 1,416 | 64.5 | +17.1 |
| Liberal Democrats | Zelda Pittman | 475 | 21.6 | −9.8 |
| Labour | Steven Gray | 185 | 8.4 | −0.3 |
| UKIP | Elaine Kingston | 63 | 2.9 | −9.6 |
| Reform UK | Mike Bennison | 56 | 2.6 | N/A |
| Majority | | 941 | 42.9 | |
| Turnout | | 2,215 | 34.2 | |
| Conservative hold | | Swing | | |

=== Esher ===
Esher
| Party | Candidate | Votes | % | ±% |
|---|---|---|---|---|
| Esher Residents' Association | David Young | 1,435 | 52.4 | +5.7 |
| Conservative | Jeremy Larsson | 992 | 36.2 | −3.4 |
| Green | Laura Harmour | 173 | 6.3 | −2.8 |
| Labour | Susan Dennis | 138 | 5.0 | +0.4 |
| Majority | | 443 | 16.2 | |
| Turnout | | 2,750 | 41.2 | |
| Residents gain from Conservative | | Swing | | |

=== Hersham Village ===
Hersham Village
| Party | Candidate | Votes | % | ±% |
|---|---|---|---|---|
| Conservative | Paul Wood | 1,294 | 52.3 | −0.5 |
| Liberal Democrats | Chester Chandler | 781 | 31.5 | N/A |
| Labour | Jeremy Brown | 401 | 16.2 | +4.0 |
| Majority | | 513 | 17.3 | |
| Turnout | | 2,496 | 38.0 | |
| Conservative gain from Residents | | Swing | | |

=== Hinchley Wood & Weston Green ===
Hinchley Wood & Weston Green
| Party | Candidate | Votes | % | ±% |
|---|---|---|---|---|
| Hinchley Wood Residents' Association | Gill Coates | 1,711 | 59.2 | -14.4 |
| Conservative | Geoff Herbert | 575 | 19.9 | +8.6 |
| Liberal Democrats | Liz Ambekar | 502 | 17.4 | +2.4 |
| Labour | James Samuel | 101 | 3.5 | N/A |
| Majority | | 1,136 | 39.3 | |
| Turnout | | 2,900 | 45.1 | |
| Residents hold | | Swing | | |

=== Long Ditton ===
Long Ditton
| Party | Candidate | Votes | % | ±% |
|---|---|---|---|---|
| Liberal Democrats | Jez Langham | 1,329 | 52.9 | −4.9 |
| Conservative | Claudia Riley-Hards | 808 | 32.1 | −4.6 |
| Green | Greg Knowles | 218 | 8.7 | N/A |
| Labour | Jake Lewis | 120 | 4.8 | −0.7 |
| UKIP | Samantha Fry | 39 | 1.6 | N/A |
| Majority | | 521 | 20.8 | |
| Turnout | | 2,527 | 47.7 | |
| Liberal Democrats hold | | Swing | | |

=== Molesey East ===
Molesey East
| Party | Candidate | Votes | % | ±% |
|---|---|---|---|---|
| Molesey Residents' Association | Peter Pope | 1,014 | 34.8 | -13.2 |
| Conservative | Xingang Wang | 892 | 30.6 | +0.7 |
| Liberal Democrats | Richard Flatau | 553 | 19.0 | +9.5 |
| Green | Lisa Howard | 245 | 8.4 | +0.5 |
| Labour | Rosie Rendall | 186 | 6.4 | +1.7 |
| UKIP | Donald Anderson | 27 | 0.9 | N/A |
| Majority | | 122 | 4.2 | |
| Turnout | | 2,937 | 43.3 | |
| Residents hold | | Swing | | |

=== Molesey West ===
Molesey West
| Party | Candidate | Votes | % | ±% |
|---|---|---|---|---|
| Molesey Residents' Association | Mike Axton | 1,262 | 49.4 | -14.1 |
| Conservative | Agnes Tancsane Fuchs | 563 | 22.0 | +6.5 |
| Liberal Democrats | Philip Stevenson | 499 | 19.5 | +7.6 |
| Labour | David Sheldrake | 233 | 9.1 | ±0.0 |
| Majority | | 699 | 27.4 | |
| Turnout | | 2,584 | 38.5 | |
| Residents hold | | Swing | | |

=== Oatlands & Burwood Park ===
Oatlands & Burwood Park
| Party | Candidate | Votes | % | ±% |
|---|---|---|---|---|
| Conservative | Ananya Banerjee | 1,454 | 59.3 | −1.0 |
| Liberal Democrats | Helgi Joensen | 772 | 31.5 | +12.1 |
| Labour | Angus Rendall | 224 | 9.1 | +3.9 |
| Majority | | 682 | 27.8 | |
| Turnout | | 2,475 | 41.4 | |
| Conservative hold | | Swing | | |

=== Oxshott & Stoke D'Abernon ===
Oxshott & Stoke D'Abernon
| Party | Candidate | Votes | % | ±% |
|---|---|---|---|---|
| Conservative | Alan Parker | 1,901 | 69.2 | +3.7 |
| Liberal Democrats | Patrick Combe | 685 | 24.9 | −5.3 |
| Labour | Carolyn Gray | 162 | 5.9 | +1.6 |
| Majority | | 1,216 | 44.3 | |
| Turnout | | 2,758 | 41.0 | |
| Conservative hold | | Swing | | |

=== Thames Ditton ===
Thames Ditton
| Party | Candidate | Votes | % | ±% |
|---|---|---|---|---|
| Thames Ditton & Weston Green Residents' Association | Alex Batchelor | 1,633 | 56.0 | -11.4 |
| Liberal Democrats | David Gattey | 489 | 16.8 | +2.3 |
| Conservative | Patrick Wylde | 456 | 15.6 | +3.5 |
| Green | Martin Clark | 190 | 6.5 | −2.7 |
| Labour | James Fearnley-Marr | 146 | 5.0 | −0.9 |
| Majority | | 1,144 | 39.2 | |
| Turnout | | 2,923 | 43.8 | |
| Residents hold | | Swing | | |

=== Walton Central ===
Walton Central
| Party | Candidate | Votes | % | ±% |
|---|---|---|---|---|
| The Walton Society | Chris Sadler | 1,157 | 46.8 | -10.2 |
| Conservative | Paul Liptrot | 689 | 27.8 | −5.5 |
| Liberal Democrats | Damien Nolan | 450 | 18.2 | N/A |
| Labour | Elina Simanovits | 178 | 7.2 | −2.5 |
| Majority | | 468 | 19.0 | |
| Turnout | | 2,495 | 40.0 | |
| Residents hold | | Swing | | |

=== Walton North ===
Walton North
| Party | Candidate | Votes | % | ±% |
|---|---|---|---|---|
| Conservative | Lewis Brown | 766 | 38.5 | −7.5 |
| Liberal Democrats | Clare Bailey | 489 | 24.6 | −1.4 |
| Independent | Andrew Kelly | 408 | 20.5 | N/A |
| Labour | Peter Ashurst | 326 | 16.4 | −11.6 |
| Majority | | 277 | 13.9 | |
| Turnout | | 2,009 | 32.9 | |
| Conservative hold | | Swing | | |

=== Walton South ===
Walton South
| Party | Candidate | Votes | % | ±% |
|---|---|---|---|---|
| Conservative | John Cope | 1,375 | 51.1 | +0.3 |
| Liberal Democrats | Kirsty Hewens | 1,083 | 40.3 | +5.0 |
| Labour | Katrina Jepson | 232 | 8.6 | −5.3 |
| Majority | | 292 | 10.8 | |
| Turnout | | 2,713 | 40.7 | |
| Conservative hold | | Swing | | |

=== Weybridge Riverside ===
Weybridge Riverside
| Party | Candidate | Votes | % | ±% |
|---|---|---|---|---|
| Liberal Democrats | Judy Sarsby | 1,225 | 49.9 | +2.3 |
| Conservative | Manjit Gill | 956 | 38.9 | −2.4 |
| Labour Co-op | Helen Pilmer | 275 | 11.2 | +5.1 |
| Majority | | 269 | 11.0 | |
| Turnout | | 2,486 | 41.1 | |
| Liberal Democrats hold | | Swing | | |

=== Weybridge St. George's Hill ===
Weybridge St. George's Hill
| Party | Candidate | Votes | % | ±% |
|---|---|---|---|---|
| Weybridge & St. George's Independents | Peter Harman | 1,153 | 44.6 | -7.8 |
| Conservative | David Harvey | 1,064 | 41.1 | +1.5 |
| Labour | Warren Weertman | 249 | 9.6 | +1.7 |
| Independent | Nicholas Wood | 121 | 4.7 | N/A |
| Majority | | 89 | 3.7 | |
| Turnout | | 2,607 | 40.7 | |
| Residents hold | | Swing | | |

== By-elections ==
Cobham & Downside, 1 July 2021
| Party | Candidate | Votes | % | ±% |
|---|---|---|---|---|
| Liberal Democrats | Robin Stephens | 890 | 49.8 | +28.2 |
| Conservative | Corinne Sterry | 778 | 43.5 | −21.0 |
| Green | Laura Harmour | 54 | 3.0 | N/A |
| Labour | Irene Threlkeld | 47 | 2.6 | −5.8 |
| Reform UK | Elaine Kingston | 19 | 1.1 | −1.8 |
| Majority | | 112 | 6.3 | |
| Turnout | | 1,788 | 27.6 | |
| Liberal Democrats gain from Conservative | | Swing | | |
