= 2008 Elmbridge Borough Council election =

2008 English local government election

Map of the 2008 Kirklees Metropolitan Borough Council election

The 2008 Elmbridge Borough Council election took place on 1 May 2008 to elect a third of the members of Elmbridge Borough Council, the council of Kirklees in England. This was on the same day as the other 2008 United Kingdom local elections. The previous council election took place in 2007 and the following election was held in 2010. In the election, the Conservative Party gained the council from no overall control.

== Results ==
Party	Previous	Seats +/-	2008
Conservative	28	▲4	32
Residents Association	24	▼3	21
Liberal Democrat	8	▼1	7

== See also ==
- Elmbridge Borough Council elections
