= 2023 Elmbridge Borough Council election =

Local election in Surrey, England

← 2022	4 May 2023	2024 →

16 out of 48 seats to Elmbridge Borough Council 25 seats needed for a majority

	First party	Second party	Third party
Leader	Bruce McDonald	Chris Sadler	John Cope
Party	Liberal Democrats	Residents	Conservative
Seats before	14	19	15
Seats won	9	5	2
Seats after	19	17	12
Seat change	▲5	▼2	▼3
- Winner of each seat at the 2023 Elmbridge Borough Council election
Leader before election
Chris Sadler
Residents Association
No overall control
Leader after election
Bruce McDonald
Liberal Democrats
No overall control

The 2023 Elmbridge Borough Council election was held on 4 May 2023 to elect members of Elmbridge Borough Council in Surrey, England. This was on the same day as other local elections across England. There were 16 out of 48 seats contested, being the usual third of the council.

== Summary ==
Prior to the election the council was under no overall control; the Conservatives were the largest party but the council was being run by a coalition of the Residents Associations and the Liberal Democrats, led by Chris Sadler of the Residents Associations. The Conservatives lost the majority of the seats they were defending, mainly to the Liberal Democrats who became the largest party. The Liberal Democrats and Residents Associations continued their coalition after the election, but with Liberal Democrat group leader Bruce McDonald taking over as leader of the council.

== Overall results ==
2023 Elmbridge Borough Council election
Party	This election			Full council			This election		
Party	Seats	Net	Seats %	Other	Total	Total %	Votes	Votes %	+/−
Liberal Democrats	9	+6	56.3	10	19	39.6	15,560	38.9	
Conservative	2	-4	12.5	10	12	25.0	13,139	32.8	
Residents	5	-2	31.3	11	17	35.4	8,384	21.0	
Labour	0	0	0.0	0	0	0.0	2,586	6.5	
Heritage	0	0	0.0	0	0	0.0	174	0.4	
Reform UK	0	0	0.0	0	0	0.0	101	0.3	
UKIP	0	0	0.0	0	0	0.0	55	0.1	

== Ward results ==
Candidates seeking re-election are marked with an asterisk (*).

=== Claygate ===
Claygate
Party	Candidate	Votes	%	±%
Liberal Democrats	Alex Coomes*	1,732	70.1	+5.8
Conservative	John Burns	631	25.6	−3.3
Labour	Sue Cope	106	4.3	N/A
Majority		1,101	44.5	
Turnout		2,469	44.5	
Liberal Democrats hold		Swing		

=== Cobham and Downside ===
Cobham and Downside
Party	Candidate	Votes	%	±%
Liberal Democrats	Robin Stephens*	1,252	49.2	+1.2
Conservative	Katerina Lusk Posledni	1,098	43.1	−4.4
Labour	Carolyn Gray	116	4.6	+0.1
Reform UK	Elaine Kingston	57	2.2	N/A
Heritage	Paul Van Der Hagen	23	0.9	N/A
Majority		154	6.1	
Turnout		2,546	39.2	
Liberal Democrats gain from Conservative		Swing		

Robin Stephens had won the seat from the Conservatives in a by-election in 2021. Seat shown as a Liberal Democrat gain from Conservatives to allow comparison with 2019 results.

=== Esher ===
Esher
Party	Candidate	Votes	%	±%
Residents	Richard Williams*	1,301	51.3	+5.5
Conservative	Amanda Manship	989	39.0	+0.5
Labour	Richard Bennett	247	9.7	+2.2
Majority		312	12.3	
Turnout		2,537	38.6	
Residents hold		Swing		

=== Hersham Village ===
Hersham Village
Party	Candidate	Votes	%	±%
Liberal Democrats	Paul Hughes	1,300	46.6	+1.5
Conservative	Mary Sheldon*	1,236	44.3	±0.0
Labour	Susan Dennis	251	9.0	−1.5
Majority		64	2.3	
Turnout		2,787	41.8	
Liberal Democrats gain from Conservative		Swing		

=== Hinchley Wood and Weston Green ===
Hinchley Wood and Weston Green
Party	Candidate	Votes	%	±%
Residents	Janet Turner*	1,603	61.9	−2.2
Liberal Democrats	Liz Ambekar	518	20.0	−2.6
Conservative	Caroline Kim	384	14.8	+1.5
Labour	Rachelle Headland	84	3.2	N/A
Majority		1,085	41.9	
Turnout		2,589	40.3	
Residents hold		Swing		

=== Long Ditton ===
Long Ditton
Party	Candidate	Votes	%	±%
Liberal Democrats	Neil Houston*	1,471	70.6	−2.9
Conservative	Blake Coe	471	22.6	−3.9
Labour	Ahmad Ali	141	6.8	N/A
Majority		1,000	48.0	
Turnout		2,083	39.6	
Liberal Democrats hold		Swing		

Neil Houston had been elected in 2019 as a Liberal Democrat, left the party to sit as an independent during 2021 but returned to the party shortly before the election in 2023.

=== Molesey East ===
Molesey East
Party	Candidate	Votes	%	±%
Liberal Democrats	Richard Flatau	1,236	42.6	+6.4
Residents	Pat Gormley	920	31.7	+11.1
Conservative	Chen Zhao	615	21.2	−15.2
Labour	Rosie Rendall	129	4.4	+1.4
Majority		316	10.9	
Turnout		2,900	43.0	
Liberal Democrats gain from Residents		Swing		

=== Molesey West ===
Molesey West
Party	Candidate	Votes	%	±%
Residents	Tony Popham*	927	43.0	+0.3
Liberal Democrats	Paul Nagle	701	32.5	+9.5
Conservative	Agnes Fuchs	384	17.8	−6.9
Labour	Jamal Ajjane	143	6.6	−3.0
Majority		226	10.5	
Turnout		2,155	32.8	
Residents hold		Swing		

=== Oatlands and Burwood Park ===
Oatlands and Burwood Park
Party	Candidate	Votes	%	±%
Conservative	Hilary Butler*	1,290	51.3	+1.2
Liberal Democrats	Nicholas Davis	1,014	40.3	−2.4
Labour	Angus Rendall	157	6.2	−1.0
UKIP	Nicholas Wood	55	2.2	N/A
Majority		276	11.0	
Turnout		2,516	42.1	
Conservative hold		Swing		

=== Oxshott and Stoke d'Abernon ===
Oxshott and Stoke d'Abernon
Party	Candidate	Votes	%	±%
Conservative	Corinne Sterry	1,573	60.5	+4.1
Liberal Democrats	Sue Grose	898	34.6	−9.0
Labour	Steven Gray	69	2.7	N/A
Heritage	Gaynor Van Der Hagen	59	2.3	N/A
Majority		675	25.9	
Turnout		2,599	38.9	
Conservative hold		Swing		

=== Thames Ditton ===
Thames Ditton
Party	Candidate	Votes	%	±%
Residents	Elaine Sesemann	1,563	58.2	−1.1
Liberal Democrats	David Gattey	643	24.0	−3.3
Conservative	Yanik Gammampila	307	11.4	−2.0
Labour	Richard Lewis	127	4.7	N/A
Reform UK	Nick Denton	44	1.6	N/A
Majority		920	34.2	
Turnout		2,684	40.5	
Residents hold		Swing		

=== Walton Central ===
Walton Central
Party	Candidate	Votes	%	±%
Liberal Democrats	Gregor MacGregor	1,028	39.5	+15.1
Residents	Andrew Kelly	926	35.6	+4.1
Conservative	Lloyd Soldatt	510	19.6	−6.8
Labour	Asieh Ahmadzade	138	5.3	−1.8
Majority		102	3.9	
Turnout		2,602	42.2	
Liberal Democrats gain from Residents		Swing		

=== Walton North ===
Walton North
Party	Candidate	Votes	%	±%
Liberal Democrats	Clare Bailey	1,197	55.1	−0.6
Conservative	Aliscia Butler	779	35.9	+1.0
Labour	Fatima Kamara	195	9.0	−0.4
Majority		418	19.2	
Turnout		2,171	35.9	
Liberal Democrats gain from Conservative		Swing		

=== Walton South ===
Walton South
Party	Candidate	Votes	%	±%
Liberal Democrats	Catherine Glass	1,476	50.1	−5.1
Conservative	Ellie Ioannou	1,210	41.1	+3.1
Labour	Kelly Haines	169	5.7	+1.2
Heritage	Charlie Garrod	92	3.1	+0.8
Majority		266	9.0	
Turnout		2,947	43.0	
Liberal Democrats gain from Conservative		Swing		

=== Weybridge Riverside ===
Weybridge Riverside
Party	Candidate	Votes	%	±%
Liberal Democrats	Ashley Tilling*	1,094	52.9	+0.5
Conservative	Freddie Tshiaba Mbuyi Kawaya	754	36.5	−2.6
Labour Co-op	Helen Pilmer	220	10.6	+2.1
Majority		340	16.4	
Turnout		2,068	35.1	
Liberal Democrats hold		Swing		

=== Weybridge St George's Hill ===
Weybridge St George's Hill
Party	Candidate	Votes	%	±%
Residents	Pippa Graeme	1,144	48.8	+12.9
Conservative	Colin McFarlane	908	38.7	−12.8
Labour Co-op	Gary Dean	294	12.5	−0.1
Majority		236	10.1	
Turnout		2,346	36.5	
Residents hold		Swing		

== By-elections ==
=== Molesey East ===
Molesey East: 2 November 2023
Party	Candidate	Votes	%	±%
Liberal Democrats	Kevin Whincup	694	36.1	−6.5
Conservative	Freddie Ingle	627	32.6	+11.4
Residents	Pat Gormley	523	27.2	−4.5
Green	Andrew Dillon	77	4.0	New
Majority		67	3.5	−7.4
Turnout		1,921	28.1	−14.9
Registered electors		6,844		
Liberal Democrats gain from Residents				
