= 2010 Elmbridge Borough Council election =

Local election in Surrey, UK

Results of the 2010 Elmbridge Borough Council election

Elections to Elmbridge Borough Council were held on 6 May 2010, alongside other local elections across England as well as the 2010 United Kingdom general election. 20 seats (one third) of the council were up for election. Following the election the council remained under Conservative control.

== Results summary ==
2010 Elmbridge Borough Council election
Party	Seats Before	Change	Seats After
Conservative Party	32	▲1	33
Residents Association	18	Steady	18
Liberal Democrats	7	Steady	7
Others	3	▼1	2

== See also ==
- Elmbridge Borough Council elections
