= Esher Theatre =

Theatre in Esher, England

- Interactive map of Esher Theatre
- Address: Community Walk; Esher, KT10; United Kingdom
- Coordinates: 51.370417°N 0.362759°W
- Owner: Swift Entertainment
- Capacity: Main stage: 300
- Type: Off-West End theatre
- Public transit: Esher

Construction
- Opened: 4 September 2021; 4 years ago

Website
- www.eshertheatre.com

Esher Theatre in Esher opened on 4 September 2021. It features a 200-seat main theatre with 350 standing.

Esher Theatre is a "multi-faceted entertainment venue for the arts". The theatre is one of the largest workable stages in Elmbridge. The theatre began its first season in September 2021, with performances from Harry Hill and Andy Parsons, as well as a production of Tchaikovsky's ballet The Nutcracker.

== History ==
The theatre's building, erected as a music hall in 1936, is located off Esher High Street. It used to be home to King George's Hall community centre. A major development, refurbishment and restoration project by Charlie Swift of Swift Entertainment turned the building into a performing arts venue. The sound equipment was provided to the theatre by Funktion-One.

The theatre opened on 4 September 2021 with a performance from Leee John from the band Imagination.

Since its opening it has presented performances by comedians, musicians and entertainers, including Cliff Richard, Chris Jagger, Harry Hill, Brian Blessed, Sally Morgan, Reginald D. Hunter, Toyah, Zoe Lyons and Milton Jones.

== Productions ==
In addition to hosting touring and one-off productions, Esher Theatre produces the annual pantomime.

=== Pantomime ===
The 2022 production of Aladdin starred Bobby Crush, Peter Straker and Jan Hunt. It was received well by local critics.

In 2023, the venue produced Dick Whttington starring Sinitta as Queen Rat, Sally Morgan as Fairy Bow Bells and Peter Straker as The Sultan.
