= 2022 Elmbridge Borough Council election =

Local election in Surrey, England

Results of the 2022 Elmbridge Borough Council election

The 2022 Elmbridge Borough Council election was held on 5 May 2022 to elect members of Elmbridge Borough Council in England.

== Results summary ==
2022 Elmbridge Borough Council election
Party	This election			Full council			This election		
Party	Seats	Net	Seats %	Other	Total	Total %	Votes	Votes %	+/−
Residents	5	▲2	31.3	14	19	39.6	7,828	19.1	-3.9
Conservative	4	▼6	35.0	11	15	31.3	14,518	35.6	-3.7
Liberal Democrats	7	▲4	43.8	6	13	27.1	15,600	38.1	+11.6
Independent	0	Steady	0.0	1	1	2.1	258	0.6	-0.7
Labour	0	Steady	0.0	0	0	0.0	2,090	5.1	-2.3
Green	0	Steady	0.0	0	0	0.0	521	1.3	-0.7
Heritage	0	Steady	0.0	0	0	0.0	69	0.2	New

== Results by Ward ==
=== Claygate ===
Claygate
Party	Candidate	Votes	%	±%
Liberal Democrats	Mike Rollings	1,702	64.3	+3.9
Conservative	John Burns	765	28.9	−6.6
Green	Helena Coomes	178	6.7	N/A
Majority		937	35.4	
Turnout		2,645	48.4	−1.9
Liberal Democrats hold		Swing		

=== Cobham & Downside ===
Cobham and Downside
Party	Candidate	Votes	%	±%
Liberal Democrats	Laurence Wells	1,170	48.0	+26.4
Conservative	Katerina Lusk Posledni	1,158	47.5	−17.0
Labour	Irene Threlkeld	109	4.5	−3.9
Majority		12	0.5	
Turnout		2,437	37.9	+3.7
Liberal Democrats gain from Conservative		Swing		

=== Esher ===
Esher
Party	Candidate	Votes	%	±%
Residents	Simon Waugh	1,257	45.8	−6.6
Conservative	Amanda Manship	1,058	38.5	+2.3
Green	Laura Harmour	226	8.2	+1.9
Labour	Richard Bennett	205	7.5	+2.5
Majority		199	7.2	
Turnout		2,746	41.3	+0.1
Residents hold		Swing		

=== Hersham Village ===
Hersham Village
Party	Candidate	Votes	%	±%
Liberal Democrats	Chester Chandler	1,122	45.1	+13.6
Conservative	John O'Reilly	1,102	44.3	−8.0
Labour	Kelly Haines	262	10.5	−5.7
Majority		20	0.8	
Turnout		2,486	37.7	+0.3
Liberal Democrats gain from Conservative		Swing		

=== Hinchley Wood & Weston Green ===
Hinchley Wood & Weston Green
Party	Candidate	Votes	%	±%
Residents	James Crawshaw	1,669	64.1	+4.9
Liberal Democrats	Liz Ambekar	588	22.6	+5.2
Conservative	Xingang Wang	347	13.3	−6.6
Majority		1,081	41.5	
Turnout		2,604	41.1	−4.0
Residents hold		Swing		

=== Long Ditton ===
Long Ditton
Party	Candidate	Votes	%	±%
Liberal Democrats	Elizabeth Laino	1,772	73.5	+20.6
Conservative	Patrick Wylde	639	26.5	−5.6
Majority		1,133	47.0	
Turnout		2,411	46.1	−1.6
Liberal Democrats hold		Swing		

=== Molesey East ===
Molesey East
Party	Candidate	Votes	%	±%
Conservative	Steve Bax	1,125	36.4	+5.8
Liberal Democrats	Richard Flatau	1,120	36.2	+17.2
Residents	Harry Lojhan	637	20.6	−14.2
Green	Lisa Howard	117	3.8	−4.6
Labour	Rosie Rendall	94	3.0	−3.4
Majority		5	0.2	
Turnout		3,093	46.3	+3.0
Conservative hold		Swing		

=== Molesey West ===
Molesey West
Party	Candidate	Votes	%	±%
Residents	Ruby Ahmed	966	42.7	−6.7
Conservative	Agnes Fuchs	558	24.7	+2.7
Liberal Democrats	Phil Smith-Stevenson	519	23.0	+3.5
Labour	David Sheldrake	217	9.6	+0.5
Majority		408	18.1	
Turnout		2,260	34.3	−4.2
Residents hold		Swing		

=== Oatlands & Burwood Park ===
Oatlands & Burwood Park
Party	Candidate	Votes	%	±%
Conservative	Harrison Allman-Varty	1,171	50.1	−9.2
Liberal Democrats	Peter Hampson	999	42.7	+11.2
Labour	Fatima Kamara	168	7.2	−1.9
Majority		172	7.4	
Turnout		2,338	39.6	−1.8
Conservative hold		Swing		

=== Oxshott & Stoke D'Abernon ===
Oxshott & Stoke D'Abernon
Party	Candidate	Votes	%	±%
Conservative	Andrew Burley	1,478	56.4	−12.8
Liberal Democrats	Sue Grose	1,143	43.6	+18.7
Majority		335	12.8	
Turnout		2,621	39.6	−1.4
Conservative hold		Swing		

=== Thames Ditton ===
Thames Ditton
Party	Candidate	Votes	%	±%
Residents	Caroline James	1,629	59.3	+3.3
Liberal Democrats	David Gattey	749	27.3	+10.5
Conservative	Corrine Sterry	369	13.4	−2.2
Majority		880	32.0	
Turnout		2,747	41.8	−2.0
Residents hold		Swing		

=== Walton Central ===
Walton Central
Party	Candidate	Votes	%	±%
Residents	Barry Cheyne	761	31.5	−15.3
Conservative	Lloyd Soldatt	638	26.4	−1.4
Liberal Democrats	Clare Bailey	589	24.4	+6.2
Independent	Christine Richardson	258	10.7	N/A
Labour	Katrina Jepson	172	7.1	−0.1
Majority		123	5.1	
Turnout		2,418	39.6	−0.4
Residents gain from Conservative		Swing		

=== Walton North ===
Walton North
Party	Candidate	Votes	%	±%
Liberal Democrats	Nick Dodds	1,256	55.7	+31.1
Conservative	Aliscia Butler	786	34.9	−3.6
Labour	Nick Clifton	213	9.4	−7.0
Majority		470	20.8	
Turnout		2,255	37.6	+4.7
Liberal Democrats gain from Conservative		Swing		

=== Walton South ===
Walton South
Party	Candidate	Votes	%	±%
Liberal Democrats	Kirsty Hewens	1,671	55.2	+14.9
Conservative	Malcolm Howard	1,151	38.0	−13.1
Labour	Vera-Anne Anderson	136	4.5	−4.1
Heritage	Charlie Garrod	69	2.3	N/A
Majority		520	17.2	
Turnout		3,027	45.2	+4.5
Liberal Democrats gain from Conservative		Swing		

=== Weybridge Riverside ===
Weybridge Riverside
Party	Candidate	Votes	%	±%
Liberal Democrats	Helgi Joensen	1,200	52.4	+2.5
Conservative	Freddie Tshiaba Mbuyi Kawaya	896	39.1	+0.2
Labour	Helen Pilmer	194	8.5	−2.7
Majority		304	13.3	
Turnout		2,290	38.5	−2.6
Liberal Democrats hold		Swing		

=== Weybridge St. George's Hill ===
Weybridge St. George's Hill
Party	Candidate	Votes	%	±%
Conservative	Charu Sood	1,304	51.5	+10.4
Residents	John Gilfillan	909	35.9	−8.7
Labour	Warren Weertman	320	12.6	+3.0
Majority		395	15.6	
Turnout		2,533	39.9	−0.8
Conservative hold		Swing		
