= Sandown House =

Municipal building in Esher, Surrey, England

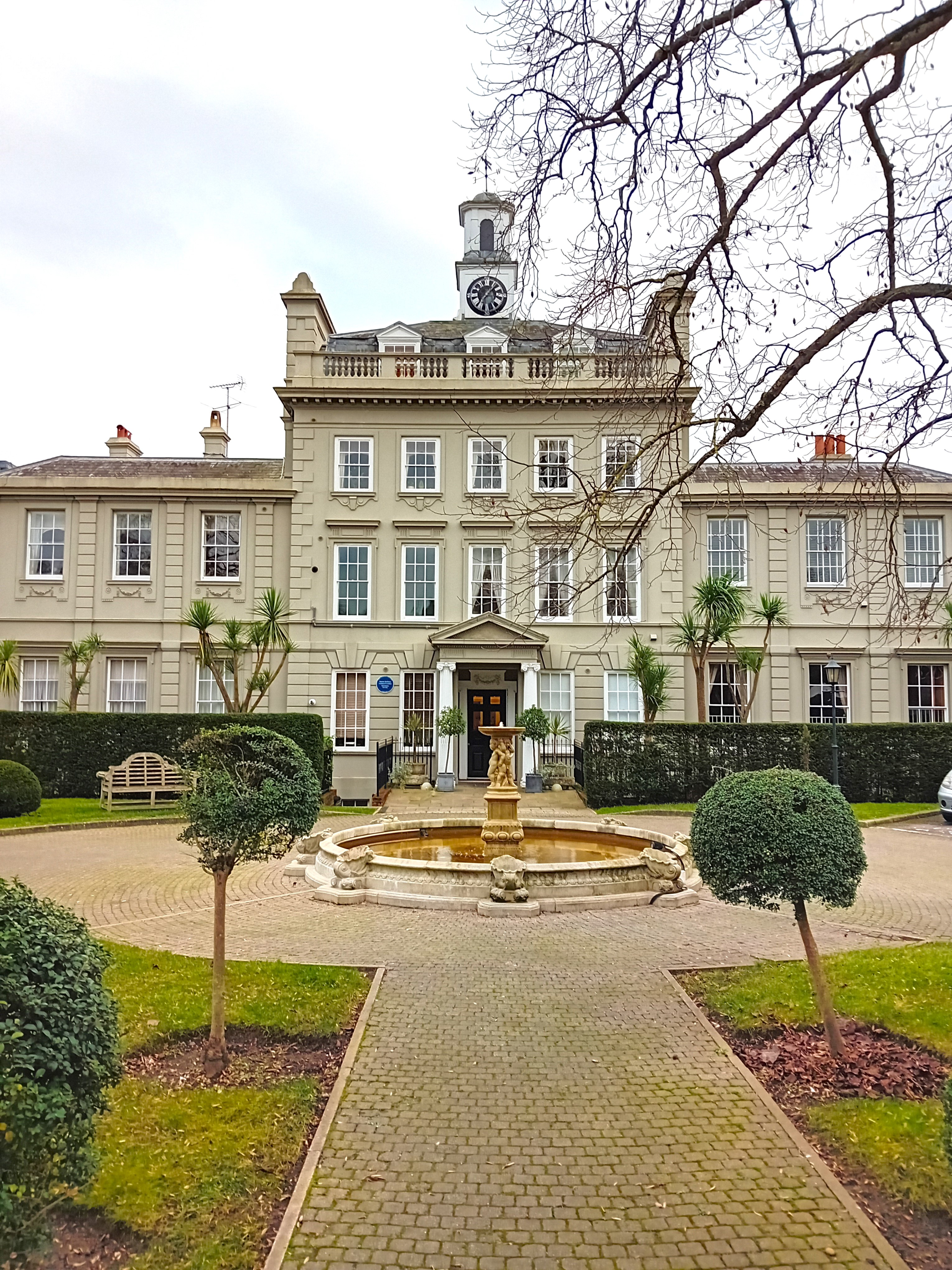
- The building in 2024

- Shown in Surrey
- 51.3710°N 0.3622°W
- Location: High Street, Esher

History
- Built: 1762 (remodelling)

Site notes
- Architectural style: Neoclassical style

Listed Building – Grade II
- Official name: Sandown House
- Designated: 28 May 1969
- Reference no.: 1030194

Sandown House, known as Esher Town Hall during much of the 20th century, is a historic building in the High Street in Esher, a town in Surrey, in England. The building, which has been converted into flats, is a Grade II listed building.

== History ==
Elements of the building may dated back to the late 17th century. However, much of the significant development of the house took place after it was acquired by the East India Company trader, Richard Barwell, in the mid-18th century. A degree of re-modelling took place when Barwell commissioned Sir William Chambers to re-design much of the interior in 1762. It then became the home of a local magistrate, James Nugent Daniell, in the first half of the 19th century. Various sources state that the mathematician and writer, Ada Lovelace, lived at Sandown from 1841 until her death in 1852. (Note: Despite the blue plaque on Sandown House, Ockham Parish Council claim that Ada Lovelace actually lived at Ockham Park, not Sandown House.)

The house was then became the home of the Governor of the Bank of England, James Pattison Currie, in the mid-19th century. In around 1880, some of the land around the house was sold to Sandown Park Racecourse.

After Esher Urban District Council was formed in 1894, it was initially based at Brabant Villa in Thames Ditton; however, by the end of the First World war, these premises were inadequate and, in 1922, the council acquired Sandown House to serve as Esher Town Hall. The house continued to serve as the headquarters of the council for over half a century, but it ceased to be the local seat of government when the enlarged Elmbridge Borough Council was formed at Walton-on-Thames in 1974. The new council continued to use Sandown House as a base for the delivery of local services until 1992.

The house was subsequently sold to a developer, Active Office, and, in April 1998, after the building became dilapidated, Active Office was fined £5,000 for neglecting to undertake repairs. It was bought by Latchmere Properties and Countryside Residential in May 2000 and was then converted into apartments in the early 21st century.

== Architecture ==
The five-bay central section of the building is three storeys high, with attics above, while the four-bay wings are of two storeys. It is built of brick with stucco finish. It features a central pedimented portico, formed by Ionic order columns supporting an entablature and a pediment, and it is fenestrated with sash windows. The bays are separated by banded pilasters supporting a modillioned cornice and balustrade at the eaves. There is also a square cupola built of brick, housing a clock. To the left is a five-bay extension. Inside, the entrance hall has a grand staircase. The house was grade II listed in 1969.
