= Esher =

Town in Surrey, England

Coordinates: 51.3691°N 0.365°W

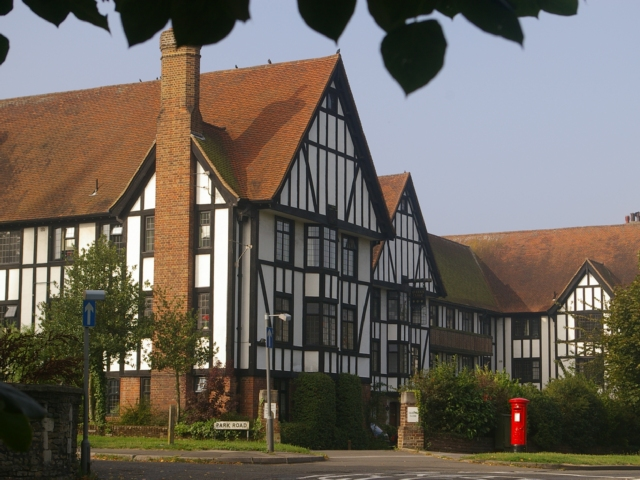
- Queen's Close

- Location within Surrey
- Area: 9.3 km^{2} (3.6 sq mi)
- Population: 6,743 (Esher town, 2011 census), or 50,904 (in 2011) for the Esher Built-up Area Subdivision (including East and West Molesey, Thames Ditton, Hinchley Wood and Claygate)
  - Density: 725/km^{2} (1,880/sq mi)
- OS grid reference: TQ145645
  - London: 14.1 miles (22.7 km) NE
- Civil parish: n/a
- District: Elmbridge
- Shire county: Surrey
- Region: South East
- Country: England
- Sovereign state: United Kingdom
- Post town: ESHER
- Postcode district: KT10
- Dialling code: 01372
- Police: Surrey
- Fire: Surrey
- Ambulance: South East Coast
- UK Parliament: Esher and Walton

Esher (/ˈiːʃər/ EE-shər) is a town in the borough of Elmbridge in north Surrey, England, to the east of the River Mole.

Esher is an outlying suburb of London, close to the London–Surrey border; with Esher Commons at its southern end, the town marks a southern limit of the Greater London Built-Up Area. Elevations range from 10m to 47m above sea level.

Esher has a linear commercial high street and is otherwise suburban in density, with varying elevations, few high rise buildings and very short sections of dual carriageway within the ward itself. Esher covers a large area, between 13 and 15.4 miles southwest of Charing Cross. (Note: Esher post town is about twice the size of its electoral ward and historic parish as it takes in Claygate and two former parts of Thames Ditton: Hinchley Wood and parts of Weston Green.) In the south it is bounded by the A3 Portsmouth Road which is of urban motorway standard and buffered by the Esher Commons.

Esher is bisected by the A307, historically the Portsmouth Road, which for approximately 1 mile (1.6 km) forms its high street. Esher railway station (served by the South West Main Line) connects the town to London Waterloo.

Sandown Park Racecourse is in the town near the station. In the south, Claremont Landscape Garden owned and managed by the National Trust, once belonged to Princess Charlotte and her husband Leopold I of Belgium. Accordingly, the town was selected to have a fountain by Queen Victoria and has an adjacent Diamond Jubilee column embossed with a relief of the monarch and topped by a statue of Britannia. Unite, the union, trains representatives at its Esher Place centre, and the town has the offices of Elmbridge Borough Council in its high street.

== History ==
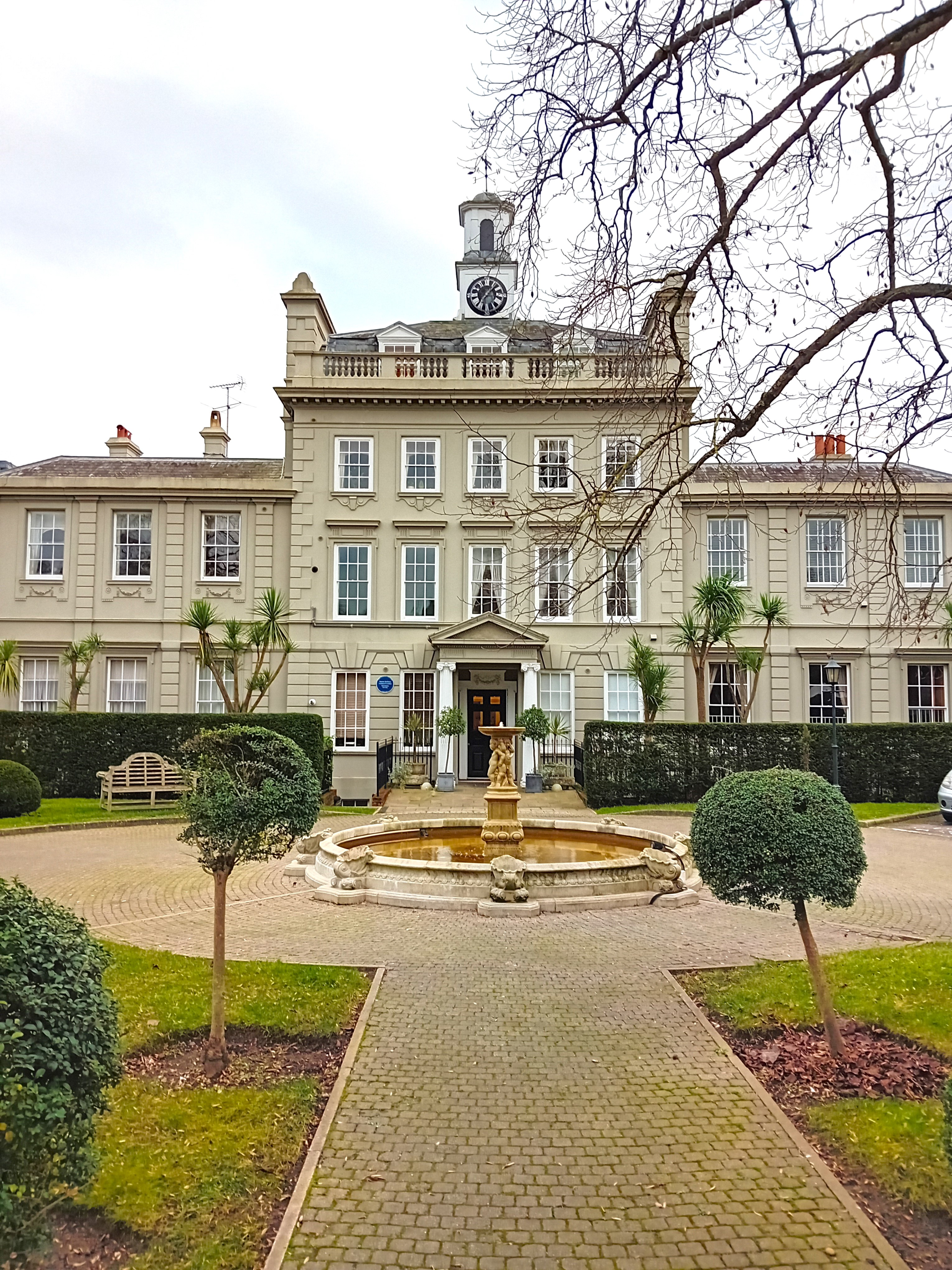
Sandown House

Esher lay within the Saxon feudal division of Elmbridge hundred.

Esher appears in the Domesday Book of 1086 as Aissela and Aissele, where it is held partly by the Abbey of the Cross in Normandy; partly by William de Waterville; partly by Reginald; partly by Hugh do Port; and partly by Odard Balistarius (probably a crossbowman). Its domesday assets were: 14 hides, 6 ploughs and 2 acres (8,100 m^{2}) of meadow. It rendered £6 2s 0d per year to its feudal overlords.

In the 16th century King Henry VIII annexed several of the manors to the Honour of Hampton Court, including Esher, to form a royal hunting ground. The town slowly grew as a stagecoach stop on the London–Portsmouth road that was later numbered the A3, although it was bypassed in the mid-1970s when it became the A307. Clive of India built the Claremont mansion (Note: Claremont was originally Esher Episcopi Manor, bought by Sir John Vanbrugh, who built a smaller house for himself, and began to ornament the grounds (Guest's poem 'Claremont' attributes the first improvements to Vanbrugh). The Earl of Clare (created Duke of Newcastle in 1715) bought the property in 1714 on coming of age and called the property after his own title 'Clare Mont.' On his death in 1768 the whole was bought by Lord Clive, who employed Capability Brown to build the present mansion (now Claremont School)) and this later became a royal residence used by Queen Victoria. In 1841 Esher had 1261 inhabitants across 2,075 acres (840 ha). Queen Victoria lent Claremont to the exiled French King Louis-Philippe and his consort Queen Marie-Amelie after the revolution of 1848. Prince Leopold of Saxe-Coburg lived there until he became King of the Belgians.

By 1908, Esher contained the fashionable residences of several important figures including Lady Emma Talbot; Sir Robert Hawthorn Collins, the Duchess of Albany and Sir Edgar Vincent, K.C.M.G. who was later created 1st Viscount D'Abernon.

George Harrison of The Beatles owned a house named Kinfauns in Esher, in the 1960s. The other Beatles were regular visitors to the house, and Harrison's primitive home recording studio.

Maurice Gibb of the Bee Gees owned a home called The Firs in Esher, from the 1970s until 2004, which was sold after his death. The hit single "Juliet" was written and recorded by Maurice and Robin Gibb in the Studio at The Firs for Robin's solo album project in the 1980s.

Sir Arthur Conan Doyle placed the murder of fictional character, Mr. Garcia, in and around Esher in his Sherlock Holmes mystery, "The Adventure of Wisteria Lodge". In the mystery, Dr. Watson described his and Holmes' arrival in Esher by stating, "It was nearly six o'clock before we found ourselves in the pretty Surrey village of Esher, with Inspector Baynes as our companion."

== Government ==
Esher is within the Esher and Walton parliamentary constituency which is represented by Monica Harding, a member of the Liberal Democratic party, since July 2024. The predecessor Esher parliamentary constituency was replaced on boundary changes before the 1997 general election.

Esher is part of the East Molesey and Esher ward of Surrey County Council. The ward is represented by a Residents' association councillor.

The town is covered by the Esher ward of Elmbridge Borough Council, which has elections in three years out of four (is elected in thirds). Esher Town Hall has reverted to its original name of Sandown House and has been converted into apartments.

== Education ==
Esher has a mix of state and private schools. There are four state primary schools across the postal district of Esher, including Esher Church School and Cranmere in Esher itself, as well as schools in Hinchley Wood and Claygate. Esher Church of England High School is the state secondary school in the town of Esher. Hinchley Wood School in the neighbouring area of Hinchley Wood has been an Academy since February 2012. Hinchley Wood is also one of the Further education establishments in the area. Esher College is in nearby Thames Ditton. Esher is also home to the West End Playgroup & Forest School, a pre-school for 2-5 year olds.

== Culture, community and sport ==
=== Cinema ===
The Everyman (formerly Odeon) cinema is a central feature of Esher's High Street with four screens.

=== Sport ===
Esher Cricket Club was established in 1863. They play matches in the Esher Park private estate, in New Road and have a youth cricket training and playing squad. The members of the cricket club also wanted to play tennis and established the Esher Lawn Tennis Club in 1889. A second cricket club arrived in 1875 as West End (Esher) Cricket Club.

Esher has a history with horse racing since the purpose-built Sandown Park race course opened in 1875.

In 1881 Esher Leopold football club was established which was formed out of the ashes of the dissolved Weybridge Swallows club. The club played at Sandown Park, close to the racecourse. The club's sole contribution to the national game was its one appearance in the FA Cup, a 5–0 home defeat to the holders, Old Carthusians, in 1881–82, although the club did reach the semi-finals of the Surrey Senior Cup, losing to Reigate Priory. The club continued into the 1883–84 season.

Esher Rugby Club was established in 1923 and play on the Hersham borders at the Molesey Road stadium, where they have several training grounds there.

A smaller football club AFC Westend was established in 2003.

=== Amenities, local events and media ===
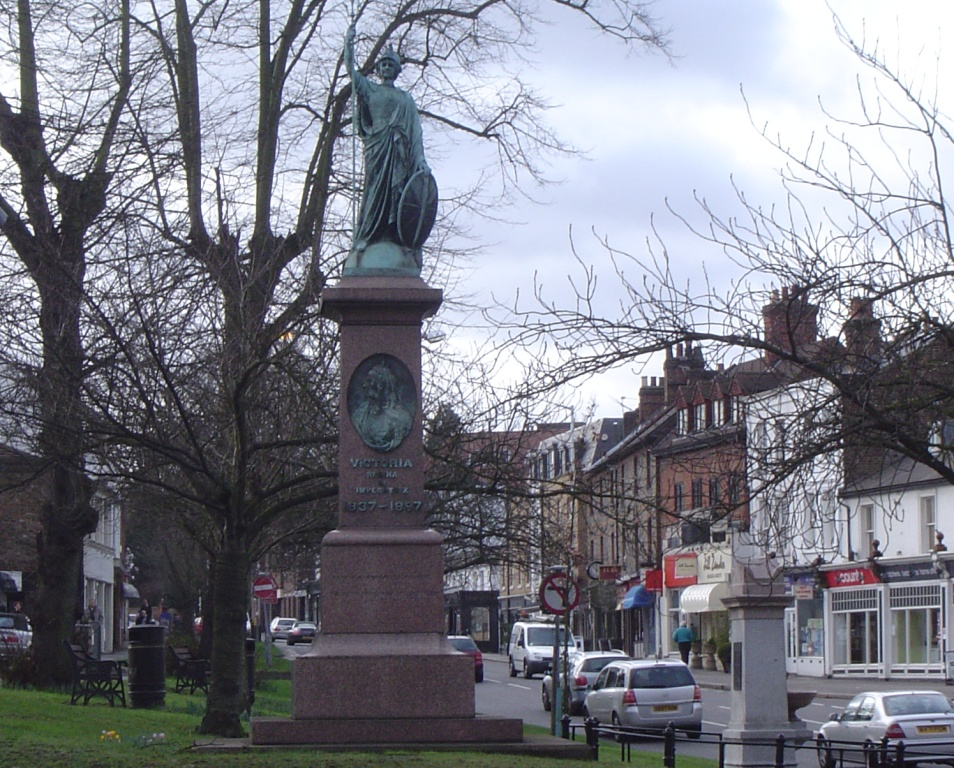
Britannia

Esher Theatre is a 300-seat performing arts venue on Esher High Street, which opened on 4 September 2021.

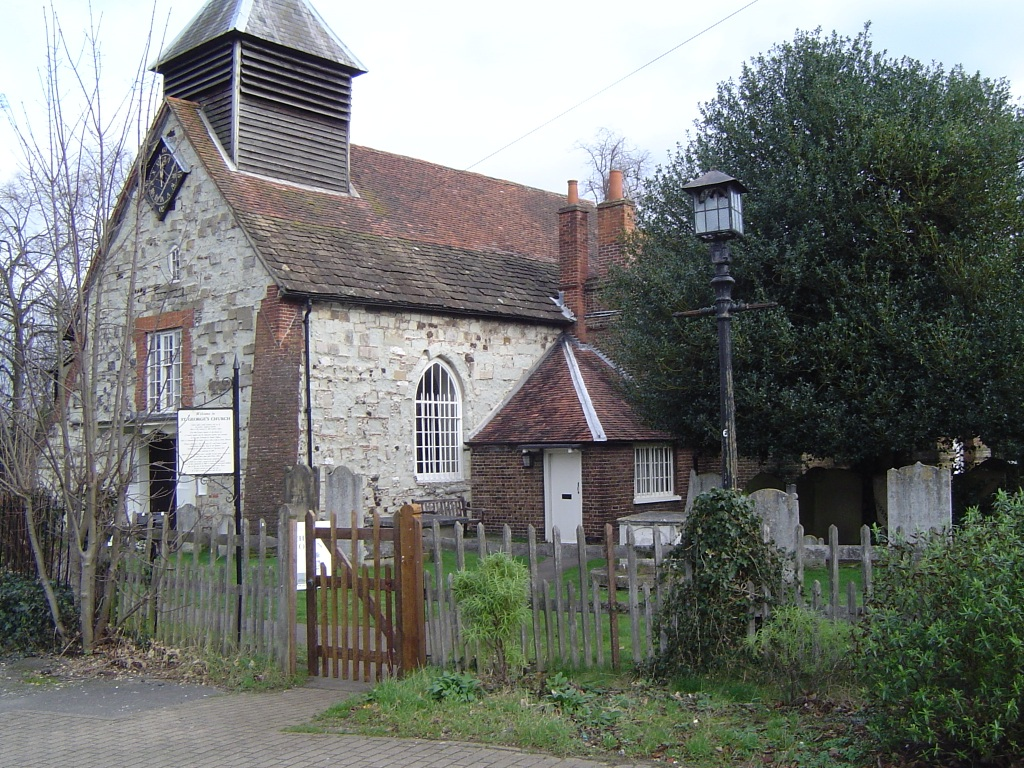
St George's Church, Esher

Esher West End hosts an annual flower show and the Hampton Court Flower Show is nearby. Similarly, Surrey Wildlife Trust manage Wisley and Ockham Commons, partly within the borough of Elmbridge and Esher is approximately midway between the two leading Surrey and International Gardens, the Royal Botanical Gardens, Kew and RHS Garden, Wisley.

A weekly newspaper, Esher News and Mail, closed down in 2009. Current newspapers include the Surrey Herald: Cobham, Esher and Claygate edition and Living Within monthly magazine/newspaper.

Vantage points include various outcrops of Esher Commons close to Hersham, Cobham and Oxshott for free public use; Esher Place (national training centre of Unite, the union) where a grass garden amphitheatre was built by Lutyens for what was the manor house; the facilities at Sandown Park racecourse and Claremont Landscape Garden.

== Housing ==
2011 Census Homes
Output area	Detached	Semi-detached	Terraced	Flats and apartments	Caravans/temporary/mobile homes	Shared between households
(ward)	1,341	417	332	542	0	6

The average level of accommodation in the region composed of detached houses was 28%, the average that was apartments was 22.6%.

Output area	Population	Households	% Owned outright	% Owned with a loan	hectares
(ward)	6,743	2,638	39	33	930

The proportion of households in the settlement who owned their home outright compares to the regional average of 35.1%. The proportion who owned their home with a loan compares to the regional average of 32.5%. The remaining % is made up of rented dwellings (plus a negligible % of households living rent-free).

== Notable residents ==
- David Buck (1936-1989), actor and author.
- Pattie Boyd (1944–), model and photographer.
- John Cobb (1899–1952), racing driver.
- Maurice Gibb (1949–2003), pop musician.
- George Harrison (1943–2001), musician.
- Lily James (1989–), actress.
- Sam Kelly (1943–2014), actor.
- Ada Lovelace (1815–52), mathematician, lived at Sandown House, no. 1, Esher High Street.
- Roots Manuva (1972–), hip-hop musician.
- Montague Phillips (1885–1969), composer and his wife Clara Butterworth lived at Clare Cottage, Clare Hill for 50 years.
- Roger Scantlebury (1936–), computer scientist.
- Sophie Dora Spicer Maude (1854–1937), writer.
- Eric Sykes (1923–2012), comedic actor and writer.
- Chris Tarrant (1946–), television light entertainment presenter.

== See also ==
- St George's Church, Esher
- Wayneflete Tower
- West End, Esher
- Lower Green, Esher
- William Brett, 1st Viscount Esher
- Moore Place, a former mansion

== Notes and references ==
Notes
