= 2024 Elmbridge Borough Council election =

Local election in Surrey, England

- 2 May 2024

16 out of 48 seats to Elmbridge Borough Council 25 seats needed for a majority

	First party	Second party
Leader	Bruce McDonald (defeated)	Various
Party	Liberal Democrats	Residents
Last election	9 seats, 38.9%	5 seats, 21.0%
Seats before	20	16
Seats won	7	5
Seats after	23	15
Seat change	▲3	▼1
	Third party	Fourth party
Leader	John Cope
Party	Conservative	Independent
Last election	2 seats, 32.8%	N/A
Seats before	12	0
Seats won	3	1
Seats after	9	1
Seat change	▼3	▲1
- Winner of each seat at the 2024 Elmbridge Borough Council election
Leader before election
Bruce McDonald
Liberal Democrats
No overall control
Leader after election
Mike Rollings
Liberal Democrats
No overall control

The 2024 Elmbridge Borough Council election was held on 2 May 2024 to elect members of Elmbridge Borough Council in Surrey, England. This was on the same day as other local elections across England and police and crime commissioner elections. There were 16 out of 48 seats contested, being the usual third of the council.

The council was under no overall control prior to the election, being run by a coalition of the Liberal Democrats and some of the residents associations, led by Liberal Democrat councillor Bruce McDonald. The council remained under no overall control after the election. The Liberal Democrats made net gains of three seats but were still two seats short of a majority, and Bruce McDonald lost his seat.

The same coalition of the Liberal Democrats and most of the residents associations continued to run the council after the election. The Liberal Democrats chose Mike Rollings to be their new group leader after the election. He was formally appointed as leader of the council at the subsequent annual council meeting on 15 May 2024.

== Overall results ==
2024 Elmbridge Borough Council election
Party	This election			Full council			This election		
Party	Seats	Net	Seats %	Other	Total	Total %	Votes	Votes %	+/−
Liberal Democrats	7	▲3	43.8	16	23	47.9	14,892	38.6	-0.3
Conservative	3	▼3	18.8	6	9	18.8	11,939	30.9	-1.9
Residents	5	▼1	31.3	10	15	31.3	6,380	16.5	-4.5
Labour	0	Steady	0.0	0	0	0.0	2,567	6.6	+0.1
Walton Society	0	Steady	0.0	0	0	0.0	809	2.1	N/A
Independent	1	▲1	6.3	0	1	2.1	1,020	2.6	N/A
Green	0	Steady	0.0	0	0	0.0	713	1.8	N/A
Reform	0	Steady	0.0	0	0	0.0	168	0.4	N/A
Heritage	0	Steady	0.0	0	0	0.0	71	0.2	N/A
UKIP	0	Steady	0.0	0	0	0.0	70	0.2	N/A

== Ward results ==
Candidates seeking re-election are marked with an asterisk (*). Ward electorates and turnout figures are reported in the House of Commons Library's 2024 Local Elections Handbook.

=== Claygate ===
Claygate
Party	Candidate	Votes	%	±%
Independent	Mary Marshall	1,020	39.9	N/A
Liberal Democrats	Bruce McDonald*	858	33.5	−36.6
Conservative	Redmond Walsh	514	20.1	−5.5
Green	Sarah Coomes	95	3.7	N/A
Labour	Steven Gray	72	2.8	−1.5
Majority		162	6.4	
Turnout		2,559	45.7	
Registered electors		5,621		
Independent gain from Liberal Democrats		Swing		

=== Cobham and Downside ===
Cobham and Downside
Party	Candidate	Votes	%	±%
Conservative	Alistair Mann*	1,010	45.8	+2.7
Liberal Democrats	Mark Pollack	888	40.3	−8.9
Reform	Elaine Kingston	168	7.6	+5.4
Labour	Irene Threlkeld	112	5.1	+0.5
Heritage	Paul Van Der Hagen	27	1.2	+0.3
Majority		122	5.5	
Turnout		2,205	34.0	
Registered electors		6,501		
Conservative hold		Swing		

=== Esher ===
Esher
Party	Candidate	Votes	%	±%
Residents	Simon Leifer	1,102	46.5	−4.8
Conservative	Amanda Manship	844	35.6	−3.4
Liberal Democrats	Cormac Evans	319	13.5	N/A
Labour	Richard Bennett	106	4.5	−4.2
Majority		258	10.9	
Turnout		2,371	36.2	
Registered electors		6,578		
Residents hold		Swing		

=== Hersham Village ===
Hersham Village
Party	Candidate	Votes	%	±%
Liberal Democrats	Wendy Gibbs	1,349	49.3	+2.7
Conservative	Lewis Brown	1,209	44.2	−0.1
Labour	Ali Ahmad	179	6.5	−2.5
Majority		140	5.1	
Turnout		2,737	40.6	
Registered electors		6,767		
Liberal Democrats gain from Conservative		Swing		

=== Hinchley Wood and Weston Green ===
Hinchley Wood and Weston Green
Party	Candidate	Votes	%	±%
Residents	Gill Coates*	1,627	63.0	+1.1
Liberal Democrats	Sally Winter	445	17.2	−2.8
Conservative	Warwick Winter	401	15.5	+0.7
Labour	Rachelle Headland	110	4.3	+1.1
Majority		1,182	45.8	
Turnout		2,583	39.8	
Registered electors		6,485		
Residents hold		Swing		

=== Long Ditton ===
Long Ditton
Party	Candidate	Votes	%	±%
Liberal Democrats	Jez Langham*	1,493	69.5	−1.1
Conservative	Caroline Kim	479	22.3	−0.3
Labour	Francis Eldergill	177	8.2	+1.4
Majority		1,004	47.2	
Turnout		2,149	40.7	
Registered electors		5,319		
Liberal Democrats hold		Swing		

=== Molesey East ===
Molesey East
Party	Candidate	Votes	%	±%
Liberal Democrats	Kevin Whincup*	1,291	48.1	+5.5
Conservative	Alain Dubois	957	35.7	+14.5
Labour	Susan Dennis	222	8.3	+3.9
Green	Andrew Dillon	214	8.0	N/A
Majority		334	12.4	
Turnout		2,684	39.5	
Registered electors		6,794		
Liberal Democrats gain from Residents		Swing		

=== Molesey West ===
Molesey West
Party	Candidate	Votes	%	±%
Residents	Pat Gormley	1,032	44.7	+1.7
Liberal Democrats	Paul Nagle	750	32.5	±0.0
Conservative	Agnes Fuchs	309	13.4	−4.4
Labour	Susan Cope	220	9.5	+2.9
Majority		282	12.2	
Turnout		2,311	34.7	
Registered electors		6,654		
Residents hold		Swing		

=== Oatlands and Burwood Park ===
Oatlands and Burwood Park
Party	Candidate	Votes	%	±%
Conservative	John Cope	1,259	48.3	−3.0
Liberal Democrats	Eva Ferlaz	1,130	43.3	+3.0
Labour	Angus Rendall	132	5.1	−1.1
Green	Clive Stevens	86	3.3	N/A
Majority		129	5.0	
Turnout		2,607	43.2	
Registered electors		6,032		
Conservative hold		Swing		

=== Oxshott and Stoke d'Abernon ===
Oxshott and Stoke d'Abernon
Party	Candidate	Votes	%	±%
Conservative	Alan Parker*	1,379	59.3	−1.2
Liberal Democrats	Diane Leakey	701	30.2	−4.4
Labour	Sarah Aylett	130	5.6	+2.9
UKIP	Nicholas Wood	70	3.0	N/A
Heritage	Gaynor Van Der Hagen	44	1.9	−0.4
Majority		678	29.1	
Turnout		2,324	34.1	
Registered electors		6,820		
Conservative hold		Swing		

=== Thames Ditton ===
Thames Ditton
Party	Candidate	Votes	%	±%
Residents	Alex Batchelor*	1,344	50.8	−7.4
Liberal Democrats	Naomi Callan	796	30.1	+6.1
Conservative	Charlotte Keywood	351	13.3	+1.9
Labour	Richard Lewis	153	5.8	+1.1
Majority		548	20.7	
Turnout		2,644	39.3	
Registered electors		6,731		
Residents hold		Swing		

=== Walton Central ===
Walton Central
Party	Candidate	Votes	%	±%
Liberal Democrats	Stanley Luker	1,055	43.6	+4.1
Walton Society	Andrew Kelly	809	33.5	−2.1
Conservative	Rahul Vermer	419	17.3	−2.3
Labour	Carolyn Gray	134	5.5	+0.2
Majority		246	10.1	
Turnout		2,417	38.6	
Registered electors		6,264		
Liberal Democrats gain from Residents		Swing		

=== Walton North ===
Walton North
Party	Candidate	Votes	%	±%
Liberal Democrats	Joshua Lambert	1,206	62.8	+7.7
Conservative	Chen Zhao	484	25.2	−10.7
Labour Co-op	Fatima Kamara	229	11.9	+2.9
Majority		722	37.6	
Turnout		1,919	31.6	
Registered electors		6,081		
Liberal Democrats gain from Conservative		Swing		

=== Walton South ===
Walton South
Party	Candidate	Votes	%	±%
Liberal Democrats	Alistair Price	1,389	51.6	+1.5
Conservative	Aliscia Butler	1,020	37.9	−3.2
Labour	Edward Marcarian	150	5.6	−0.1
Green	Jane Miles	133	4.9	N/A
Majority		369	13.7	
Turnout		2,692	38.6	
Registered electors		6,974		
Liberal Democrats gain from Conservative		Swing		

=== Weybridge Riverside ===
Weybridge Riverside
Party	Candidate	Votes	%	±%
Liberal Democrats	Judy Sarsby*	1,222	60.4	+7.5
Conservative	Freddie Tshiaba	599	29.6	−6.9
Labour Co-op	Helen Pilmer	202	10.0	−0.6
Majority		623	30.8	
Turnout		2,023	33.9	
Registered electors		5,971		
Liberal Democrats hold		Swing		

=== Weybridge St George's Hill ===
Weybridge St George's Hill
Party	Candidate	Votes	%	±%
Residents	Peter Harman*	1,275	53.0	+4.2
Conservative	Colin McFarlane	705	29.3	−9.4
Labour Co-op	Gary Dean	239	9.9	−2.6
Green	Sophie Constant	185	7.7	N/A
Majority		570	23.7	
Turnout		2,404	37.0	
Registered electors		6,506		
Residents hold		Swing		

== By-elections ==
=== Cobham and Downside by-election, 4 July 2024 ===
Cobham and Downside
Party	Candidate	Votes	%	±%
Conservative	Katerina Lusk	2,056	49.9	
Liberal Democrats	Diane Leakey	1,566	38.0	
Labour Co-op	Irene Threlkeld	348	8.5	
UKIP	Nicholas Wood	148	3.6	
Majority		490	11.9	
Turnout		4,118	62.5	
Registered electors		6,631		
Conservative gain from Liberal Democrats		Swing		

The Cobham and Downside by-election was triggered by the resignation of Liberal Democrat councillor Robin Stephens.

=== Hersham Village by-election, 10 October 2024 ===
Hersham Village
Party	Candidate	Votes	%	±%
Conservative	John O'Reilly	1,029	55.4	+11.2
Liberal Democrats	Varsha Khodiyar	736	39.6	−9.7
Labour	Francis Eldergill	94	5.1	−1.4
Majority		293	15.8	
Turnout		1,859	27.1	−13.5
Registered electors		6,880		
Conservative gain from Liberal Democrats		Swing	+10.5	

The Hersham Village by-election was triggered by the resignation of councillor Chester Chandler.

=== Weybridge St George's Hill by-election, 10 October 2024 ===
Weybridge St George's Hill
Party	Candidate	Votes	%	±%
Conservative	Colin McFarlane	608	46.0	+16.7
Independent	Andrew Kelly	598	45.2	−7.8
Green	Brittany Johansson	116	8.8	+1.1
Majority		10	0.8	
Turnout		1,322	19.7	−17.4
Registered electors		6,730		
Conservative hold		Swing	+12.3	

The Weybridge St George's Hill by-election was triggered by the death of Conservative councillor Charu Sood, who died following cancer in August 2024.
