= Elmbridge Borough Council =

Non-metropolitan district council in Surrey, England

Type
- Type: Non-metropolitan district

Leadership
- Mayor: Judy Sarsby, Liberal Democrat since 20 May 2026
- Leader: Mike Rollings, Liberal Democrat since 15 May 2024
- Chief Executive: Adam Chalmers since 2022

Structure
- Seats: 48 councillors
- Graph of the party split among 48 seats.
- Political groups: Administration (32) Liberal Democrats (20) Residents' Assoc. (12) Other parties (16) Conservative (9) Residents' Assoc. (2) Reform UK (2) Independent (2) Vacancy (1)

Elections
- Voting system: First past the post
- First election: 7 June 1973
- Last election: 2 May 2024

Meeting place
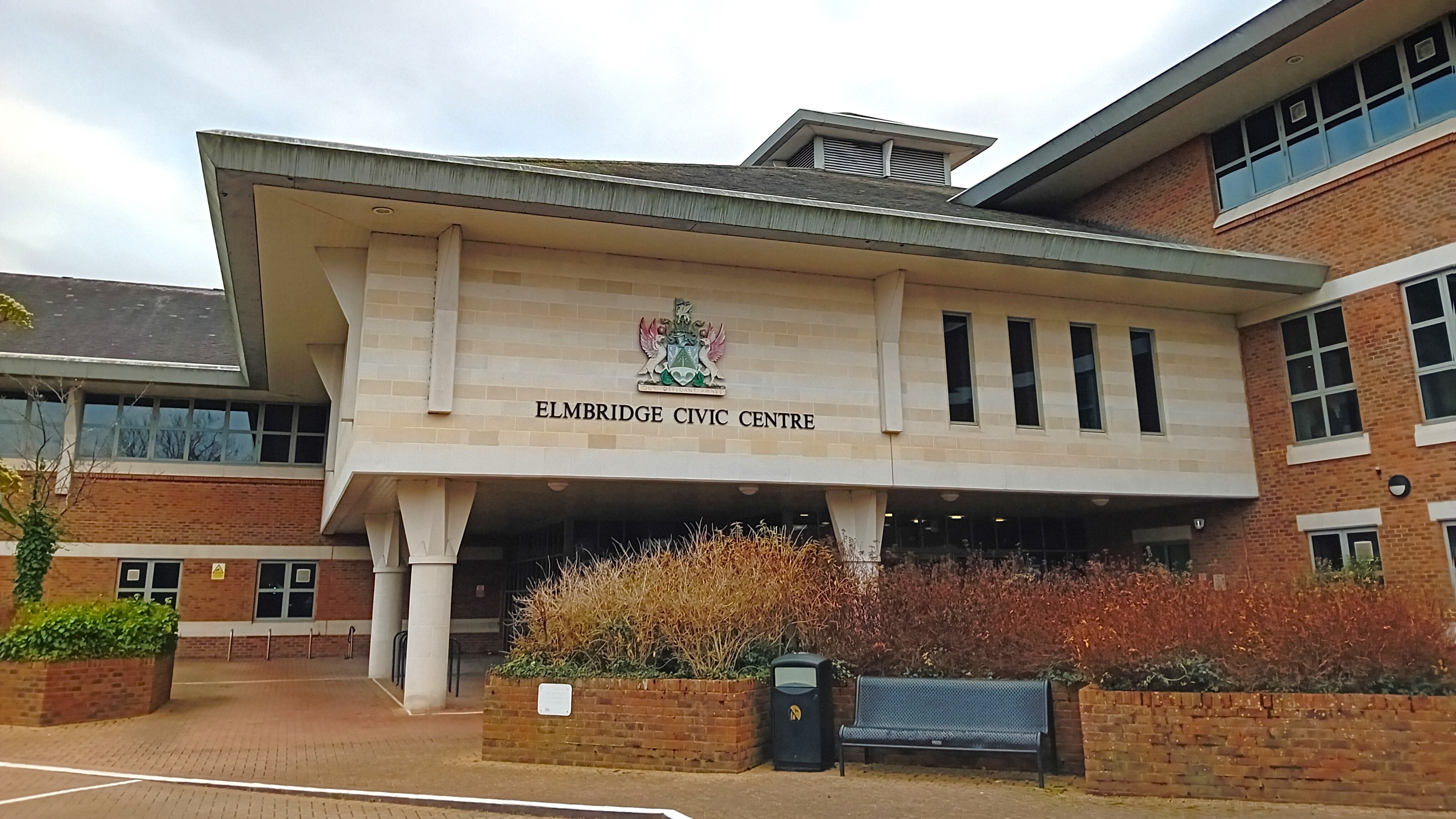
- Civic Centre, High Street, Esher, KT10 9SD

Website
- www.elmbridge.gov.uk

Elmbridge Borough Council provides district-level services to the Borough of Elmbridge, in Surrey, in South East England. It is based in the town of Esher. County-level services are provided by Surrey County Council. Claygate is a civil parish, which forms a third tier of local government for that part of the borough only; the rest of the borough is an unparished area.

Elmbridge Borough Council, along with all Surrey district councils and Surrey County Council will be abolished in 2027 as part of ongoing local government restructuring, with the area of Elmbridge to become part of East Surrey, administered by East Surrey Council.

== Political control ==
The council has been under no overall control since 2016. Since the 2023 election the council has been run by a coalition of the Liberal Democrats and most of the residents' associations (RA), with a Liberal Democrat leader of the council.

The first elections to the council were held in 1973, initially operating as a shadow authority alongside the outgoing authorities until the new arrangements came into effect on 1 April 1974. Political control of the council since 1974 has been as follows:

Party in control	Years
Conservative	1974–1986
No overall control	1986–1988
Conservative	1988–1991
No overall control	1991–2002
Independent	2002–2005
No overall control	2005–2008
Conservative	2008–2016
No overall control	2016–present

== Leadership ==
The role of mayor is largely ceremonial in Elmbridge. Political leadership is instead provided by the leader of the council. The leaders since 2010 have been:

Councillor	Party	From	To
Roy Taylor	Conservative		May 2010
John O'Reilly	Conservative	19 May 2010	May 2016
Stuart Selleck	Molesey Residents' Association	18 May 2016	16 May 2018
Tim Oliver	Conservative	16 May 2018	Jan 2019
James Browne	Conservative	27 Feb 2019	15 May 2019
Stuart Selleck	Molesey Residents' Association	15 May 2019	May 2021
Chris Sadler	The Walton Society	19 May 2021	May 2023
Bruce McDonald	Liberal Democrats	17 May 2023	May 2024
Mike Rollings	Liberal Democrats	15 May 2024	

== Composition ==
Following the 2024 election, and subsequent changes of allegiance up to May 2025, the composition of the council was:

Party	Councillors
Liberal Democrats	21
Conservative	10
Thames Ditton and Weston Green Residents' Association	4
Esher Residents' Association	3
Molesey Residents' Association	3
Hinchley Wood Residents' Association	2
Reform	1
The Walton Society	1
Weybridge and St George's Independents	1
Independent	2
Total	48

The Thames Ditton and Weston Green RA, Esher RA, Molesey RA, Walton Society, and Weybridge and St George's Independents sit together as the "Residents' Associations Group", which forms the council's administration in coalition with the Liberal Democrats.

== Elections ==
Since the last boundary changes in 2016 the council has comprised 48 councillors representing 16 wards, with each ward electing three councillors. Elections were held three years out of every four, with a third of the council (one councillor for each ward) being elected each time for a four-year term of office. Surrey County Council elections were held in the fourth year of the cycle when there are no borough council elections.

The borough council elections which had been due to take place in 2026 were cancelled. An election for the new East Surrey Council was held instead. East Surrey Council will formally come into being and take over local government functions in the area on 1 April 2027, at which point Elmbridge Borough Council and the borough of Elmbridge will be abolished.

== Premises ==
The council is based at the Civic Centre, off the High Street in the centre in Esher, which was purpose-built for the council in 1991.

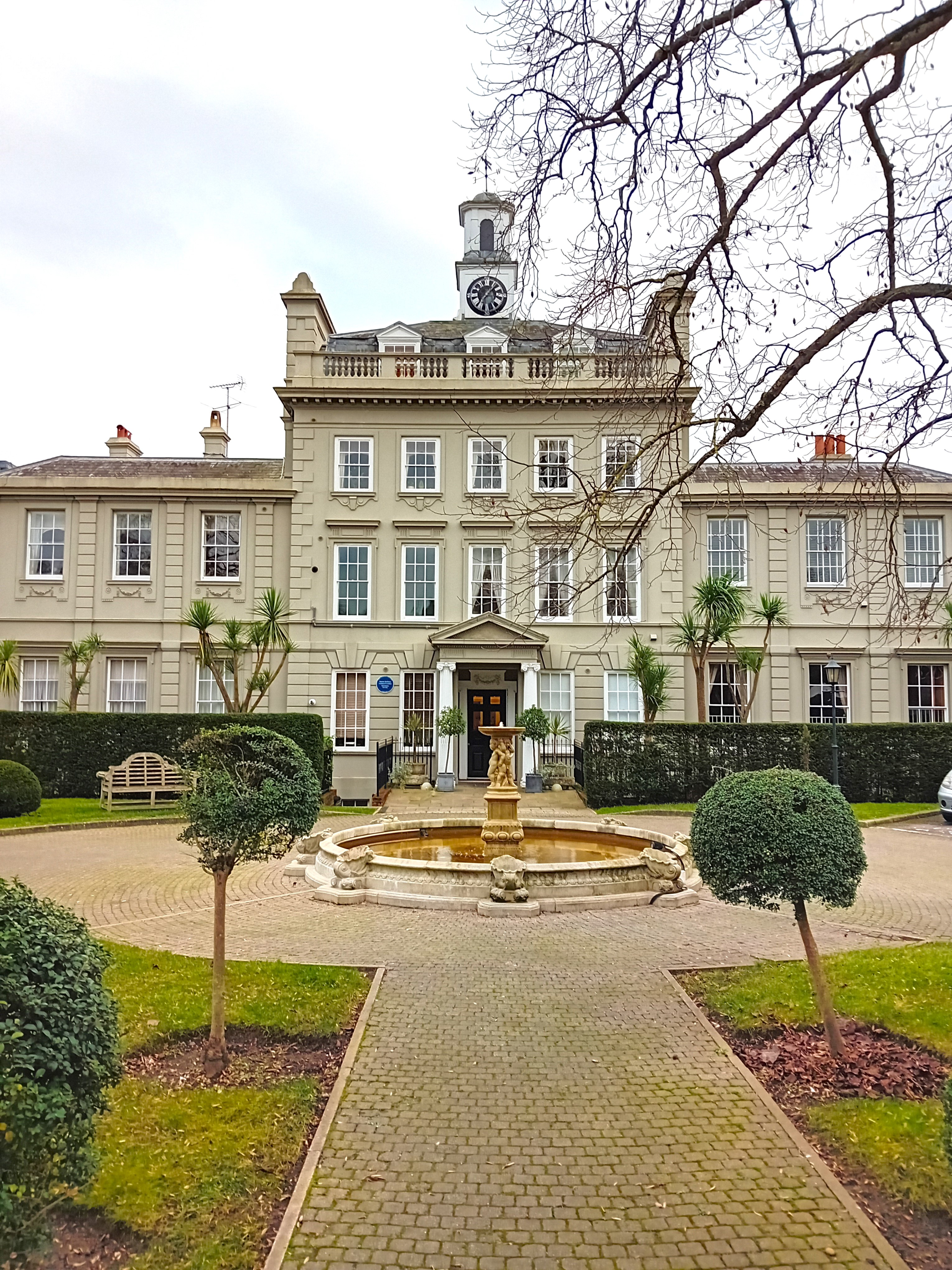
Sandown House: Council offices until 1991, now flats.

When the council was created in 1974 it inherited offices at the Town Hall on New Zealand Avenue in Walton-on-Thames from Walton and Weybridge Urban District Council, and at Sandown House at 1 High Street from Esher Urban District Council. It initially used Walton Town Hall, a 1960s building, as its headquarters, retaining Sandown House as additional offices. The new Civic Centre was built on land behind Sandown House, which has since been converted into flats, whilst Walton Town Hall has been demolished.
