= Svetlozar Rachev =

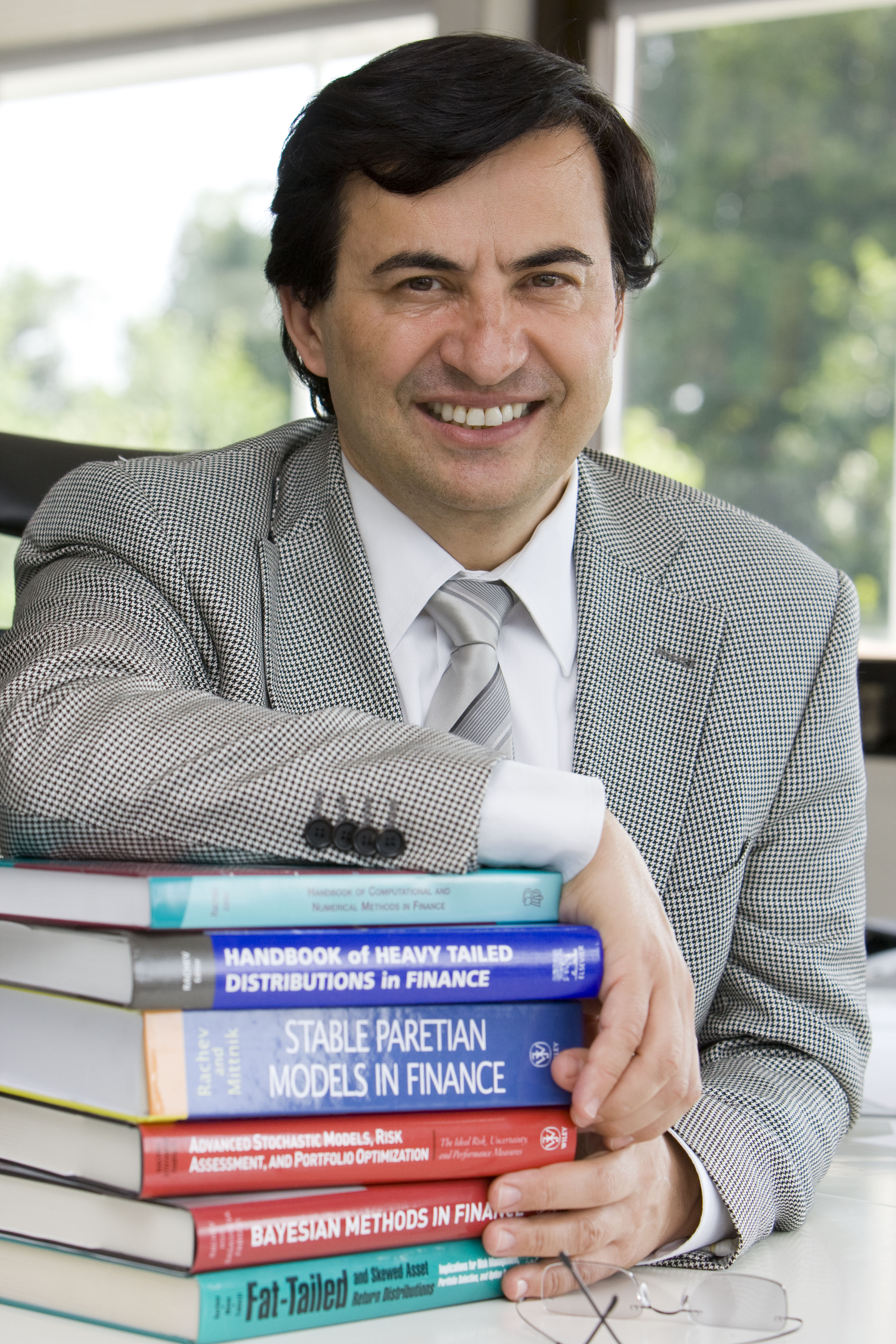
Rachev in 2008

Svetlozar "Zari" Todorov Rachev is a professor at Texas Tech University who works in the field of mathematical finance, probability theory, and statistics. He is known for his work in probability metrics, derivative pricing, financial risk modeling, and econometrics. In the practice of risk management, he is the originator of the methodology behind the flagship product of FinAnalytica.

== Life and work ==
Rachev earned a MSc degree from the Faculty of Mathematics at Sofia University in 1974, a PhD degree from Lomonosov Moscow State University under the supervision of Vladimir Zolotarev in 1979, and a Dr Sci degree from Steklov Mathematical Institute in 1986 under the supervision of Leonid Kantorovich, a Nobel Prize winner in economic sciences, Andrey Kolmogorov and Yuri Prokhorov. Currently, he is Professor of Financial Mathematics at Texas Tech University.

In mathematical finance, Rachev is known for his work on application of non-Gaussian models for risk assessment, option pricing, and the applications of such models in portfolio theory. He is also known for the introduction of a new risk-return ratio, the "Rachev Ratio", designed to measure the reward potential relative to tail risk in a non-Gaussian setting.

In probability theory, his books on probability metrics and mass-transportation problems are widely cited.

== FinAnalytica ==
Rachev's academic work on non-Gaussian models in mathematical finance was inspired by the difficulties of common classical Gaussian-based models to capture empirical properties of financial data. Rachev and his daughter, Borjana Racheva-Iotova, established Bravo Group in 1999, a company with the goal to develop software based on Rachev's research on fat-tailed models. The company was later acquired by FinAnalytica.

== Awards and honors ==
- Fellow of the Institute of Mathematical Statistics
- Humboldt Research Award for Foreign Scholars (1995)
- Honorary Doctor of Science at Saint Petersburg State Institute of Technology (1992)
- Foreign Member of the Russian Academy of Natural Sciences

== Selected publications ==
=== Books ===
- Rachev, S.T. (1991). Probability Metrics and the Stability of Stochastic Models. New York: Wiley. ISBN 978-0471928775.
- Rachev, S.T.; Rueschendorf, L. (1998). Mass Transportation Problems, Vol I: Theory. Springer. ISBN 978-1475785258.
- Rachev, S.T.; Rueschendorf, L. (1999). Mass Transportation Problems, Vol II: Applications. Springer. ISBN 978-0387983523.
- Rachev, S.T.; Mittnik, S. (2000). Stable Paretian Models in Finance. Wiley. ISBN 978-0471953142.
- Rachev, S.T.; Kim, Y.; Bianchi, M.L.; Fabozzi, F.J. (2011). Financial Models with Levy Processes and Volatility Clustering. New York: Springer. ISBN 978-0470482353.
- Rachev, S.T.; Klebanov, Lev; Stoyanov, S.V.; Fabozzi, F.J. (2013). The Methods of Distances in the Theory of Probability and Statistics. Springer. ISBN 978-1461448686.

=== Articles ===
- Rachev, S.T.; Sengupta, A. (1993). "Laplace-Weibull mixtures for modelling price changes". Management Science. 39 (8): 1029–1038. doi:10.1287/mnsc.39.8.1029.
- Mittnik, S.; Rachev, S.T. (1993). "Modeling asset returns with alternative stable distributions". Econometric Reviews. 12 (3): 261–330. doi:10.1080/07474939308800266.
- Mittnik, S.; Paollela, M.; Rachev, S.T. (2000). "Diagnosing and treating the fat tails in financial returns data". Journal of Empirical Finance. 7 (3–4): 389–416. doi:10.1016/S0927-5398(00)00019-0.
- Mittnik, S.; Paollela, M.; Rachev, S.T. (2002). "Stationarity of stable power-GARCH process". Journal of Econometrics. 106 (1): 97–107. doi:10.1016/S0304-4076(01)00089-6.
- Biglova, A.; Ortobelli, S.; Rachev, S.T.; Stoyanov, S.V. (2004). "Different Approaches to Risk Estimation in Portfolio Theory". Journal of Portfolio Management. 31 (1): 103–112. doi:10.3905/jpm.2004.443328.
- Stoyanov, S.V.; Rachev, S.T.; Fabozzi, F.J. (2007). "Optimal financial portfolios". Applied Mathematical Finance. 14 (5): 401–436. doi:10.1080/13504860701255292.
- Bierbrauer, M.; Menn, C.; Rachev, S.T.; Trück, S. (2007). "Spot and derivative pricing in the EEX power market". Journal of Banking & Finance. 31 (11): 3462–3485. doi:10.1016/j.jbankfin.2007.04.011.
- Stoyanov, S.V.; Rachev, S.T.; Racheva-Iotova, B.; Fabozzi, F.J. (2011). "Fat-tailed models for risk estimation". Journal of Portfolio Management. 37 (2): 107–117. doi:10.3905/jpm.2011.37.2.107. hdl:10419/45631.
