= Frank J. Fabozzi =

American economist, educator, writer and investor

- Education: Graduate Center of the City University of New York, City College of New York
- Known for: Co-developer of the Kalotay–Williams–Fabozzi model
- Website: Frank J. Fabozzi Associates

Frank J. Fabozzi is an American economist, educator, writer, and investor, currently Professor of Practice at The Johns Hopkins University Carey Business School and a Member of Edhec Risk Institute. He was previously a professor of finance at EDHEC Business School, Professor in the Practice of Finance and Becton Fellow in the Yale School of Management, and a visiting professor of finance at the Sloan School of Management at the Massachusetts Institute of Technology. He has authored and edited many books, three of which were coauthored with Nobel laureates, Franco Modigliani and Harry Markowitz. He has been the editor of the Journal of Portfolio Management since 1986 and is on the board of directors of the BlackRock complex of closed-end funds.

== Early life and education ==
He earned a BA (magna cum laude) and a Master of Economics from the City College of New York, both in 1970. He also earned a doctorate in economics from the Graduate Center of the City University of New York in 1972. He is a Certified Public Accountant and holds the Chartered Financial Analyst designation.

== Career ==
Fabozzi has written and edited books and numerous research papers covering topics in investment management and financial econometrics. Much of his earlier writing focused on fixed income securities and portfolio management with emphasis on mortgage- and asset-backed securities and structured products. He is a co-developer of the Kalotay–Williams–Fabozzi model of the short rate, used in the valuation of interest rate derivatives.

He is on the Advisory Council for the Department of Operations Research and Financial Engineering at Princeton University and an affiliated professor at the Institute of Statistics and Economics at the University of Karlsruhe (Germany). He has been the editor of the Journal of Portfolio Management since 1986 and is on the board of directors of the BlackRock complex of closed-end funds. Before joining EDHEC Business School, Fabozzi was a finance professor at Yale School of Management, and a visiting finance professor at the MIT Sloan School of Management.

== Recognition ==
Fabozzi was elected to Phi Beta Kappa society in 1969. He was inducted into the Fixed Income Analysts Society's Hall of Fame in 2002 and was the 2007 recipient of the C. Stewart Sheppard Award given by The CFA Institute. He is the 2004 recipient of an Honorary Doctorate of Humane Letters from Nova Southeastern University.. In 2015, Fabozzi received the James R. Vertin Award from the CFA Institute Research Foundation, which recognizes individuals whose research is "notable for its relevance and enduring value to investment professionals".

== Selected bibliography ==
- Frank J. Fabozzi and Francesco A. Fabozzi (2021): Bond Markets, Analysis, and Strategies, tenth edition. The MIT Press, Cambridge, Massachusetts. ISBN 9780262046275
- Fabozzi, Frank J.; Modigliani, Franco (2009). Capital Markets: Institutions and Instruments: 4th edition. Upper Saddle River, New Jersey: Prentice Hall.
- Fabozzi, Frank J.; Franco Modigliani; Frank J. Jones (2009). Foundations of Financial Markets and Institutions: 4th edition. Upper Saddle River, New Jersey: Prentice Hall.
- Fabozzi, Frank J. (2009). Bond Markets, Analysis and Strategies: 7th edition. Upper Saddle River, New Jersey: Prentice Hall.
- Rachev, Svetlozar T; John S.J. Hsu; Biliana Bagasheva; Frank J. Fabozzi (2008). Bayesian Methods in Finance. Hoboken, New Jersey: John Wiley & Sons.
- Fabozzi, Frank J.; Vinod Kothari (2008). Introduction to Securitization. Hoboken, Nee Jersey: John Wiley & Sons.
- Rachev, Svetlozar T; Stefan Mittnik; Frank J. Fabozzi; Sergio M. Focardi; Teo Jasic (2007). Financial Econometrics: From Basics to Advanced Modeling Techniques. Hoboken, New Jersey: John Wiley & Sons.
- Fabozzi, Frank J.; Petter N. Kolm; Dessislava Pachamanova; Sergio M. Focardi (2007). Robust Portfolio Optimization and Management. Hoboken, New Jersey: John Wiley & Sons.
- Fabozzi, Frank J. (2006). Fixed Income Mathematics: Analytical and Statistical Techniques: 4th edition. New York: New York: McGraw Hill Publishing.
- Fabozzi, Frank J.; Sergio M. Focardi; Petter N. Kolm (2006). Financial Modeling of the Equity Market: From CAPM to Cointegration. Hoboken, New Jersey: John Wiley & Sons.
- Fabozzi, Frank J.; Henry Davis; Moorad Choudhry (2006). Introduction to Structured Finance. Hoboken, New Jersey: John Wiley & Sons.
- Fabozzi, Frank J.; Harry M. Markowitz, Editors (2002). The Theory and Practice of Investment Management. Hoboken, New Jersey: Wiley.
- Fabozzi, Frank J.; Leibowitz, Martin L., Editors (2007). Fixed Income Analysis. John Wiley & Sons.

== See also ==
- Kalotay–Williams–Fabozzi model
