= Mittnik =

Mittnik is a German surname. Notable people with the surname include:

- Philipp Mittnik (born 1975), Austrian historian
- Stefan Mittnik (born 1954), German economist
