= Moorad Choudhry =

British businessman

- Education: University of Westminster; University of Reading; Henley Management College; Birkbeck University
- Years active: 1989–present

Moorad Choudhry is a noted risk and finance professional, academic and author. He is a non-executive director at Newcastle Building Society and an Honorary Professor at Kent Business School.

== Biography ==
Choudhry began his City career at the London Stock Exchange in 1989. He was formerly head of business treasury, global banking and markets at Royal Bank of Scotland plc. Before joining RBS, He was head of treasury at Europe Arab Bank, a subsidiary of Arab Bank. He joined there from KBC Financial Products in London, the derivatives and convertible bond trading arm of KBC Bank. Prior to that he was a vice-president in structured finance services sales and marketing at JPMorgan Chase Bank, a sterling proprietary trader in the Treasury division at Hambros Bank Limited, and a Gilt-Edged Market Maker and money markets trader at Hoare Govett (ABN Amro).

He has filled, also, various academic and advisory roles. He is a founder of the Certificate of Bank Treasury Risk Management, and has been on the Editorial Board of the Journal of Structured Finance, Qualitative Research in Financial Markets, and Securities and Investment Review. He has been a visiting professor at the Department of Economics, London Metropolitan University, a visiting research fellow at the ICMA Centre, University of Reading, and a senior fellow at the Centre for Mathematical Trading and Finance, Cass Business School. He is a fellow of the Securities and Investment Institute and of the Global Association of Risk Professionals.

He attended Claremont Fan Court School. He graduated from the University of Westminster (known as Polytechnic of Central London at the time) with a First class degree in economics, and from the University of Reading with an MA in Econometrics; he holds, also, an MBA from Henley Management College. In 2008, he completed a PhD in financial economics at Birkbeck, University of London.

As a British Bangladeshi, Choudhry was nominated for the Arts and Culture Awareness award at the 2015 British Muslim Awards.

== Works ==
Choudhry is author of several papers and numerous books, including an anthology of his writings. Some of his works have been translated into Chinese and Japanese.

- The Bond and Money Markets: Strategy, Trading, Analysis. Butterworth-Heinemann, 2001
- The REPO Handbook. Butterworth-Heinemann, 2002
- The Global Money Markets (with Frank J. Fabozzi; Steven V Mann). John Wiley, 2002
- The Handbook of European Fixed Income Securities (with Frank J. Fabozzi). John Wiley, 2004
- Structured Credit Products: Credit Derivatives and Synthetic Securitisation. John Wiley, 2004 (3rd ed. 2011)
- An Introduction to Credit Derivatives. Butterworth- Heineman 2004 ISBN 075066262X
- Analysing and Interpreting the Yield Curve. Wiley Asia, 2004
- The Money Markets Handbook. Wiley Asia, 2004
- Fixed-income securities and derivatives handbook: Analysis and valuation. Bloomberg Press, 2005 ISBN 9781576602201
- The Credit Default Swap Basis. Bloomberg Press, 2006
- Bank Asset and Liability Management. Wiley Asia, 2007
- Capital Market Instruments, 3rd edition. Palgrave MacMillan, 2010
- The Mechanics of Securitization: A Practical Guide to Structuring and Closing Asset-Backed Security Transactions (with Suleman Baig). Wiley, 2013. ISBN 9780470609729
- The Principles of Banking, 2nd Edition. Wiley, 2022. ISBN 9781119755685

== See also ==
- Business of British Bangladeshis
- List of British Bangladeshis
