= Scalable Capital =

German digital investment platform

- Type: Private
- Industry: Financial technology
- Founded: 2014
- Founders: Erik Podzuweit; Florian Prucker; Adam French; Stefan Mittnik
- Headquarters: Munich, Germany
- Area served: Germany, Austria, France, Italy, Spain, Netherlands
- Key people: Erik Podzuweit (co-CEO); Florian Prucker (co-CEO)
- Services: Online brokerage Digital wealth management Banking services
- Website: scalable.capital

Scalable Capital is a German digital investment platform and bank based in Munich. Founded in 2014, it launched as a robo-advisor in 2016 and later expanded into self-directed brokerage and banking services. Its services include brokerage, digital wealth management, savings plans, deposit and lending products, and access to selected private equity products.

Scalable Capital operates the European Investor Exchange (EIX) together with Börse Hannover. In 2025, its regulated banking subsidiary, Scalable Capital Bank GmbH, received a full banking licence from the European Central Bank. By August 2026, it had more than one million clients with more than €60 billion in assets and was active in Germany, Austria, France, Italy, Spain and the Netherlands.

== History ==
Scalable Capital was founded in Munich in 2014 by investment banker Erik Podzuweit, Florian Prucker, Adam French and Stefan Mittnik as a startup company.

The company launched in 2016 as a robo-advisor for automated wealth management and entered the UK market the same year. In 2017, Scalable Capital entered into a partnership with the German bank ING Germany to offer a fully digital investment service to the bank's retail customers. Bloomberg later linked the company's early growth in assets under management to its bank-partnership model, including its cooperation with ING Germany. In 2017, Scalable Capital was described as one of the fastest-growing robo-advisors worldwide.

By May 2018, Bloomberg reported that the company had reached €1 billion in assets under management and had over 30,000 customers. In 2020, Scalable Capital expanded beyond wealth management and began offering brokerage services.

In early 2021, the company closed its direct-to-consumer UK service to focus on the German market. At the time, Scalable was active in Germany and Austria and planned launches in France, Italy and Spain. In November 2021, it acquired the ETF information portal justETF.

In August 2022, the company announced that client assets had surpassed €10 billion. In April 2024, ETF Stream reported that client assets had reached €20 billion and that the customer base had grown to more than one million.

In December 2024, Scalable Capital and the Hanover Stock Exchange launched the European Investor Exchange (EIX), a trading venue intended to reduce Scalable Capital's reliance on external execution partners by bringing trading infrastructure more directly into its platform. The move allowed Scalable to handle trading, clearing, settlement, and custody on one platform.

In February 2025, Scalable Capital began offering eligible retail investors in Germany access to a BlackRock private equity fund.

During the market turmoil in April 2025, the company recorded record trading volumes and fee income, although the Financial Times reported that users also experienced access delays. BaFin later said that the technical disruptions affecting investment service providers in April 2025 had prompted additional supervisory attention to broker resilience.

In September 2025, the European Central Bank granted Scalable Capital Bank GmbH authorisation to conduct deposit-taking and lending business, giving the group a full banking licence. The move reduced the company's reliance on partner banks and supported the transition from securities accounts previously held through Baader Bank to Scalable's own infrastructure.

In August 2026, Scalable Capital opened its investment platform to external AI assistants, including ChatGPT and Claude, allowing customers to use them to analyse portfolios and conduct trades.

=== Funding rounds ===
In 2017, BlackRock took a stake in Scalable Capital. The investment was part of a €30 million funding round led by BlackRock alongside existing investors HV Holtzbrinck Ventures and Tengelmann Ventures. In August 2019, BlackRock, HV Holtzbrinck Ventures and Tengelmann Ventures invested another €25 million in a Series C round, bringing Scalable Capital's total funding to €66 million.

In July 2020, Scalable Capital raised €50 million in a Series D round at a reported post-money valuation of about €400 million. Around the same time, it launched its online broker, expanding beyond automated wealth management. In June 2021, Scalable Capital raised more than $180 million (€150 million) in a Series E funding round led by the technology company Tencent, bringing its valuation to about $1.4 billion and making it a unicorn.

In December 2023, Scalable Capital raised €60 million in an extension round led by Balderton Capital, at an unchanged $1.4 billion valuation.

In June 2025, it became known that Scalable Capital raised a total of around €155 million in a new financing round including Sofina and Noteus Partners. Existing investors Balderton Capital, Tencent, and HV Capital also participated. As of 2025, Scalable Capital had raised more than €470 million since its founding and was valued at around €1.5 billion. In 2025, the Financial Times reported that Scalable still held about half of the €300 million it had previously raised and was aiming for profitability by the following year.

== Company structure ==
Managing directors are Erik Podzuweit and Florian Prucker, who are also the founders of the company, as well as Dirk Franzmeyer, Dirk Urmoneit, and Martin Krebs. The largest shares in Scalable Capital are held by investors, including BlackRock. Founders Erik Podzuweit, Florian Prucker, Stefan Mittnik, and Adam French also hold shares (as of 2019). As of August 2026, Scalable Capital had more than one million clients with more than €60 billion in assets. In 2025, the company had over 700 employees.

== Products and services ==
Scalable Capital operates as a bank and offers self-directed brokerage and automated wealth management services. The company is active in Germany, Italy, Austria, France, Spain and the Netherlands.

The brokerage offering includes stocks, funds including exchange-traded funds (ETFs), derivatives, cryptocurrency ETPs, and private equity. In 2025, the company launched the Scalable Capital ACWI ETF. Trading uses a tiered pricing model, with a basic free tier that charges individual transaction fees and a subscription model that offers unlimited trading on orders above a defined threshold for a monthly flat fee. Automated savings plans allow regular investments starting from one euro. Scalable Capital also operates the European Investor Exchange in partnership with Börse Hannover and acts as a market-maker, while providing access to the gettex (Börse München) and Xetra (Deutsche Börse) trading venues for order execution. The execution of savings plans for ETFs is free of charge.

The company's wealth management arm, Scalable Wealth, includes automated portfolio management for passive investors. During registration, users receive suggestions based on their profiles, including risk tolerance, investment horizon, and sustainability preferences. The service includes multi-asset portfolios, portfolio monitoring, automatic rebalancing, and several investment strategies. Scalable Capital also offers a children's investment account within the Scalable Broker account, where parents can select ETFs and stocks, as well as a children's account within Scalable Wealth.

The full banking licence received in 2025 included permission from the European Central Bank (ECB) to conduct deposit and lending business, including consumer lending. In March 2026, Scalable Capital launched a separate overnight savings account.

== Legal and regulatory issues ==
In October 2020, a data breach at a former service provider used by Scalable Capital exposed identity, tax and securities-account data. According to Handelsblatt, more than 33,000 people in Germany and the UK were affected. For comparison, TechCrunch reported in June 2021 that Scalable Capital had 250,000 customers. In December 2021, the Munich I Regional Court awarded one claimant €2,500 in non-material damages and held that future material losses arising from the theft would also have to be compensated.

The dispute later formed part of joined cases C-182/22 and C-189/22 before the Court of Justice of the European Union. In June 2024, the court clarified that compensation under Article 82 of the GDPR is not limited to cases where stolen personal data has already been used for identity theft or fraud. It also held, however, that a GDPR infringement alone does not automatically entitle a claimant to damages; actual non-material harm must still be shown.

In February 2025, the Consumer Centre Baden-Württemberg issued warnings to Scalable Capital and Trade Republic over how they presented interest-bearing cash balances to customers. The consumer group argued that the brokers' marketing was misleading because the advertised interest rate was variable, applied only to the portion of customer balances held as deposits, and did not make sufficiently clear when cash could instead be placed in money market funds, which were not covered by statutory deposit-protection schemes.

== See also ==
- Trade Republic
