= The Principles of Banking =

2012 non-fiction book

- Author: Moorad Choudhry
- Language: English
- Publisher: John Wiley & Sons
- Publication date: 2012, 2022 (2nd edition)
- Pages: 886
- ISBN: 978-0-470-82521-1

The Principles of Banking is a 2012 non-fiction book written by Bangladesh-born English banking practitioner and educator Moorad Choudhry and published by John Wiley & Sons.

== Overview ==
The book explains the original, principles of banking, including lending policy and liquidity management, and why these need to be restored in order to avoid another bank crisis at the time of the next economic recession. It covers asset-liability management, liquidity risk, internal transfer pricing, capital management, and stress testing. The book considers business cycles as patterns of stable and stressful market behavior, and provides examples illustrating the key principles of bank asset-liability management. It illustrates how unsound banking practices in previous bank crashes were repeated during the creation of the 2007-2008 financial market crisis. It also offers readers access to an accompanying website holding policy templates and teaching aids.

In the second edition of The Principles of Banking, contents are organized into six parts:

- Banking, bank customer business and regulation
- Bank asset-liability management
- Bank liquidity risk management
- Bank strategy and governance
- Principles of risk management and regulation
- Guide to the companion website

== Author ==
Moorad Choudhry is an independent non-executive director at Recognise Bank Limited in London, a non-executive director at the Loughborough Building Society and an independent non-executive member of the Risk Committee at Nubank, in São Paulo. He is honorary professor at University of Kent Business School. He was latterly treasurer, corporate banking division at The Royal Bank of Scotland. He began his career at the London Stock Exchange in 1989. Moorad is a Fellow of the Chartered Institute for Securities & Investment, a Fellow of the London Institute of Banking and Finance, a Fellow of the Global Association of Risk Professionals, a Fellow of the Institute of Directors and a Freeman of The Worshipful Company of International Bankers. Moorad was born in Bangladesh and lives in Surrey, England. He was educated at Claremont Fan Court school, the University of Westminster and the University of Reading. He obtained his MBA from Henley Business School and his PhD from Birkbeck, University of London.

== Publication information ==
The Principles of Banking was first published by John Wiley & Sons in Singapore in 2012. The second edition was published in 2022 and expands upon the original edition, incorporating updates in developments and regulations and in the banking industry, including Basel III Final Form and its constituent elements of The Fundamental Review of the Trading Book, Interest Rate Risk in the Banking Book, and Recovery and Resolution Planning, as well as covering the impact of COVID-19 on banks, risk management, and balance sheet management.

== Reception ==
The Principles of Banking provides a useful framework for the analysis of risks facing banks. Bankers will surely find in Professor Choudhry's mix of practical knowledge in the field of risk and treasury management of banks and his rigorous academic approach a useful guide to a more sustained business model for their banks. The book will also appeal to regulators in the pursuit of their objective of maintaining a stable banking system. It is an invaluable practical guide and I recommend it to those involved in the banking industry.

— Business Magazine

It serves as a template and policy guide for regulators as well as practitioners.

— Securities and Investment Review

A useful tool for advanced banking students and managers...Highly recommended.

— Financial World

The Principles of Banking is ideal reading for anyone planning or developing a career in banking. Professor Choudhry's coverage is fully integrated, clear, and authoritative. There is no better practitioner's guide to this subject.

— Darrell Duffie, Dean Witter Distinguished Professor of Finance, Graduate School of Business, Stanford University

Nihar Mehta, who holds the position of Chief Corporate Development Officer at Monument Bank Ltd in London, expressed his high regard for "The Principles of Banking". He considers it the most crucial text for those in the banking industry and strongly believes that it should be an obligatory part of everyone's personal growth agendas. Mr. Mehta drew on his past experiences when he was a part of the UK Financial Services Authority, leading the change in control team. His responsibilities then included scrutinizing and granting regulatory approvals for intricate banking transactions, an example being the takeover of Northern Rock by Virgin Money. During that process, he found himself relying significantly on Professor Choudhry's text as a key reference for acquiring banking licenses.

Ted Teo, an adjunct assistant professor at NUS Business School in Singapore, shared his experience of teaching a banking course. He initially struggled to find suitable textbooks that presented a real-life banking perspective, a challenge he managed to overcome when he discovered books by Professor Choudhry. According to him, Choudhry's books accurately portray the perspective and methodology employed by bankers. They stand out by offering a practical and non-theoretical approach to understanding banking.
