= Claremont Fan Court School =

Private day school in Surrey, England

Coordinates: 51.358°N 0.371°W

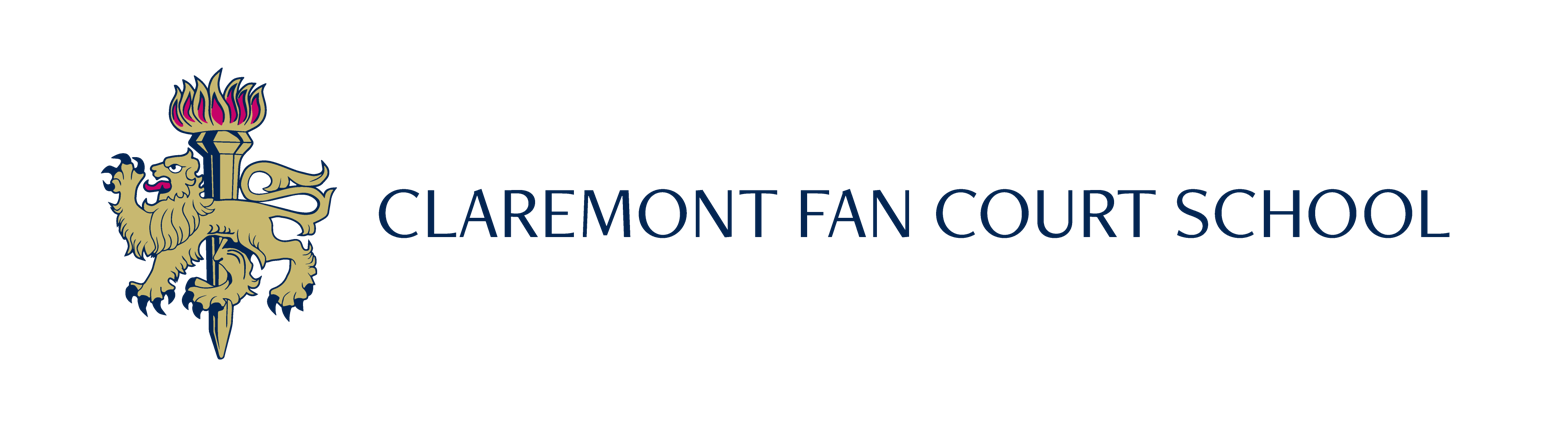

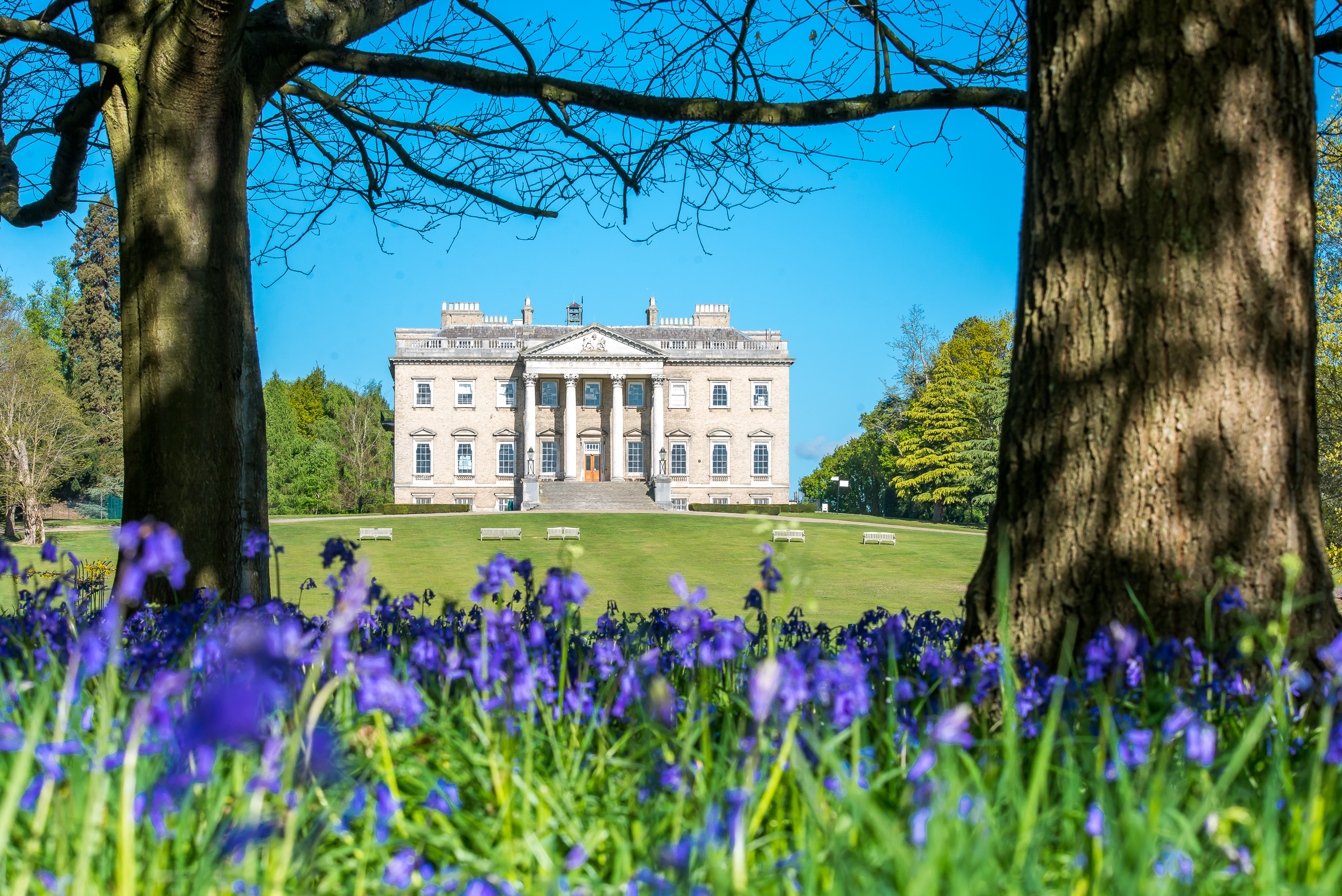
- Claremont Drive, Esher, Surrey, Surrey, KT10 9LY, England

Information
- Type: Private day school
- Established: 1922 (Claremont School) 1934 (Fan Court School) 1978 (CFCS)
- Department for Education URN: 125334 Tables
- Headmaster and head of Senior School: William Brierly
- Head of Junior School: Matthew Jelley
- Gender: Co-educational
- Age: 2 to 18
- Enrolment: 1,198
- Houses: Esher, Longcross, Norwood, Radnor, Stanmore, Banstead
- Chair of Governors: R Martin
- Website: www.claremontfancourt.co.uk

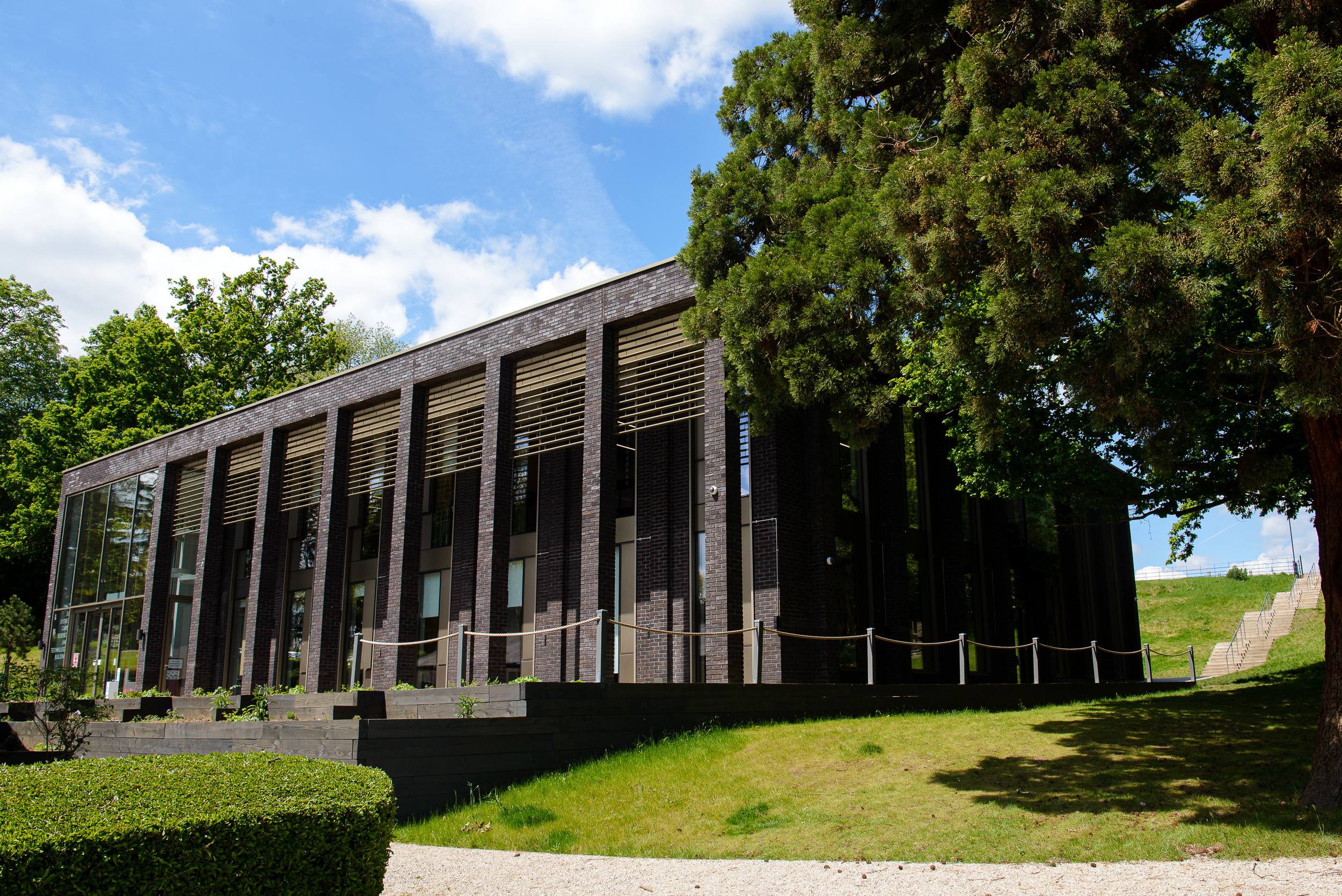
Sir Sydney Camm Building

Claremont Fan Court School is a co-educational private day school for pupils from 2 to 18 years. Situated outside Esher, in Surrey, sixteen miles from London, it is located on the grounds of the Claremont Estate. It is a member of the Society of Heads, the Independent Schools Council (ISC) and the Independent Association of Prep Schools (IAPS).

== History ==
=== Claremont Estate (1708-1919) ===
The first house to be built on the Claremont Estate was Vanbrugh House in 1708 by Sir John Vanbrugh. In 1714 it was bought by John Holles, 4th Earl of Clare (from whom the name Claremont is derived) who was later created Duke of Newcastle. Many notable residents have lived on the estate since, including: Lord Clive of India, Princess Charlotte and Prince Leopold, Princess (later Queen Victoria), King Louis Philippe and Queen Marie-Amélie, and the Duke and Duchess of Albany. The grounds too have been sculpted by several notable architects, including Vanbrugh, Capability Brown and William Kent. Throughout this period many changes were made to the buildings and grounds of the estate.

=== Claremont School (1922-1978) ===
In 1922, a school for girls began at Mrs Packers’ house (who later became the first principal of Claremont School). After moving to Clear View in Norwood in 1923 due to an expansion in pupil numbers the school moved again to Claremont in 1931 after acquiring 33 acres of the Claremont estate. By 1936 it was at full capacity with 85 pupils.

During the Second World War, the school was evacuated to Llandrindod Wells in Wales, and Claremont was let to the Hawker Aircraft company, whose design team under the aeronautical engineer Sydney Camm produced the Hawker Tempest fighter.

In 1946 the school returned to the Claremont Estate, purchasing White Cottage in 1949. By 1955 the stables had been converted to a junior school, thus allowing pupils to number 200, with half of these as boarders. By 1970 a new gymnasium, art rooms, dining room, kitchens and music block had been built.

=== Fan Court School (1932-1978) ===
In 1932 a preparatory school for boys was founded at a small house called The Lodge in Banstead, Surrey. The school briefly moved to Warren House before again moving to Fan Court, Chertsey in 1934, when it also received its formal constitution and was admitted to the Incorporated Association of Preparatory Schools.

In its early years, only five pupils attended, hailing from South Africa, USA and England. This rose to 56 prior to the outbreak of World War II and up to 85 by 1956. The school magazine was called Vox Leonis (named after the lion on the school crest). The Old Boys’ Club and Friends of Fan Court were established in 1936 and 1947 respectively. A summer garden party called Fan Court Day was held annually to celebrate the school's community and included entertainments, exhibitions and speeches.

During World War II the possibility of evacuating the school to Canada or the Bahamas was considered, however never occurred. The School planted a tree to mark the end of the war in 1945.

In 1967 a junior school for boys and girls was opened at Fan Court. Girls were able to stay at Fan Court until the age of 10 when they became eligible for entrance into Claremont School. This further strengthened the connection between the two schools that had existed since Fan Court was established. Other demonstrations of this link include: Claremont's financial support in 1955 for the construction of Fan Court's swimming pool, alternate-year joint parties beginning in 1964, a joint carol service in 1967 and joint meetings from 1967 onwards by committees and Friends of the schools.

=== Claremont Fan Court School (1978-present) ===
In 1978, Claremont School and Fan Court School amalgamated on the site of Claremont School to become a co-educational school for pupils from 2½ to 18 years. During the 1980s the Joyce Grenfell Centre was built (named after the former Claremont School pupil) housing a music school, theatre, computer suite and design and technology classrooms. A new junior school and principal's house (called Clearview after the former location of Claremont School) were also built. During the 1990s White Cottage became the Sixth Form centre and a new sports hall was built.

In September 2019, the Sir Sydney Camm science and technology building opened. In January 2022 the school purchased West Acre, a significant adjoining property.

=== Notable events ===
- 1972 – Claremont School celebrated its Golden Jubilee with the construction of a new science facility.
- 1979 (August) – HM Queen Elizabeth the Queen Mother visited the Mansion after an opening ceremony at the Claremont Landscape Gardens.
- 1996 – After repairs, the Belvedere was opened to the public for the first time to celebrate the centenary of the National Trust.

== School life ==
=== Houses ===
On entering the school pupils join one of the following six houses:

- Longcross (yellow) - named after the previous location of Fan Court School; the badge features the Longcross lion
- Norwood (blue) - named after the previous location of Claremont School; the badge features the Claremont torch
- Radnor (red) - named after the county in Wales in which Claremont School was evacuated to during WWII; the badge features the Welsh dragon
- Esher (green) - named after the current location of Claremont Fan Court School; the badge features a crown for Esher's past royal associations
- Stanmore (purple) - named after Warren House in Stanmore where Fan Court pupils were located to temporarily in 1933; the badge features a fan
- Banstead (orange) - Banstead House is named after the original Fan Court School before it moved to Stanmore.
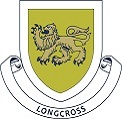
Longcross house badge

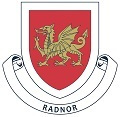
Radnor house badge

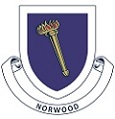
Norwood house badge

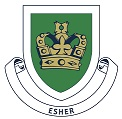
Esher house crest

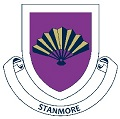
Stanmore house badge

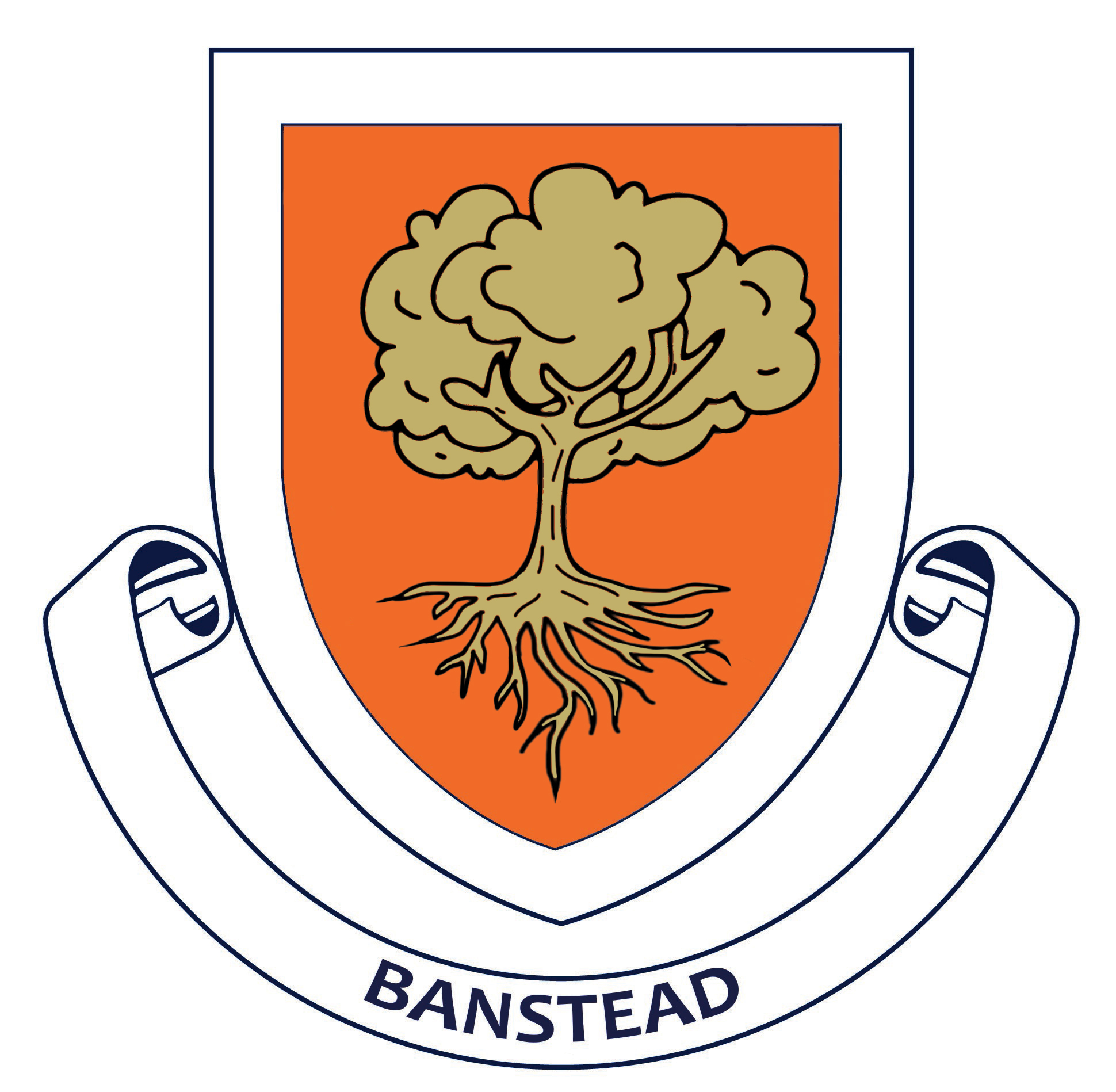
Banstead house badge

Various school interhouse activities take place throughout the year in addition to the House point system and sports day. These have included competitions in: singing, film creation, drawing, recycled fashion, engineering and cooking.

Since 1933, Fan Court School has used a house system, starting with three houses, Cayley, Lings and Macgregor, followed by the addition of a fourth (Cazalet) by 1936. Cayley and Cazalet were named after benefactors of the school. Claremont School introduced its house system in 1928 with four houses (Normans, Saxons, Tudors, and Stuarts).

=== Sports ===
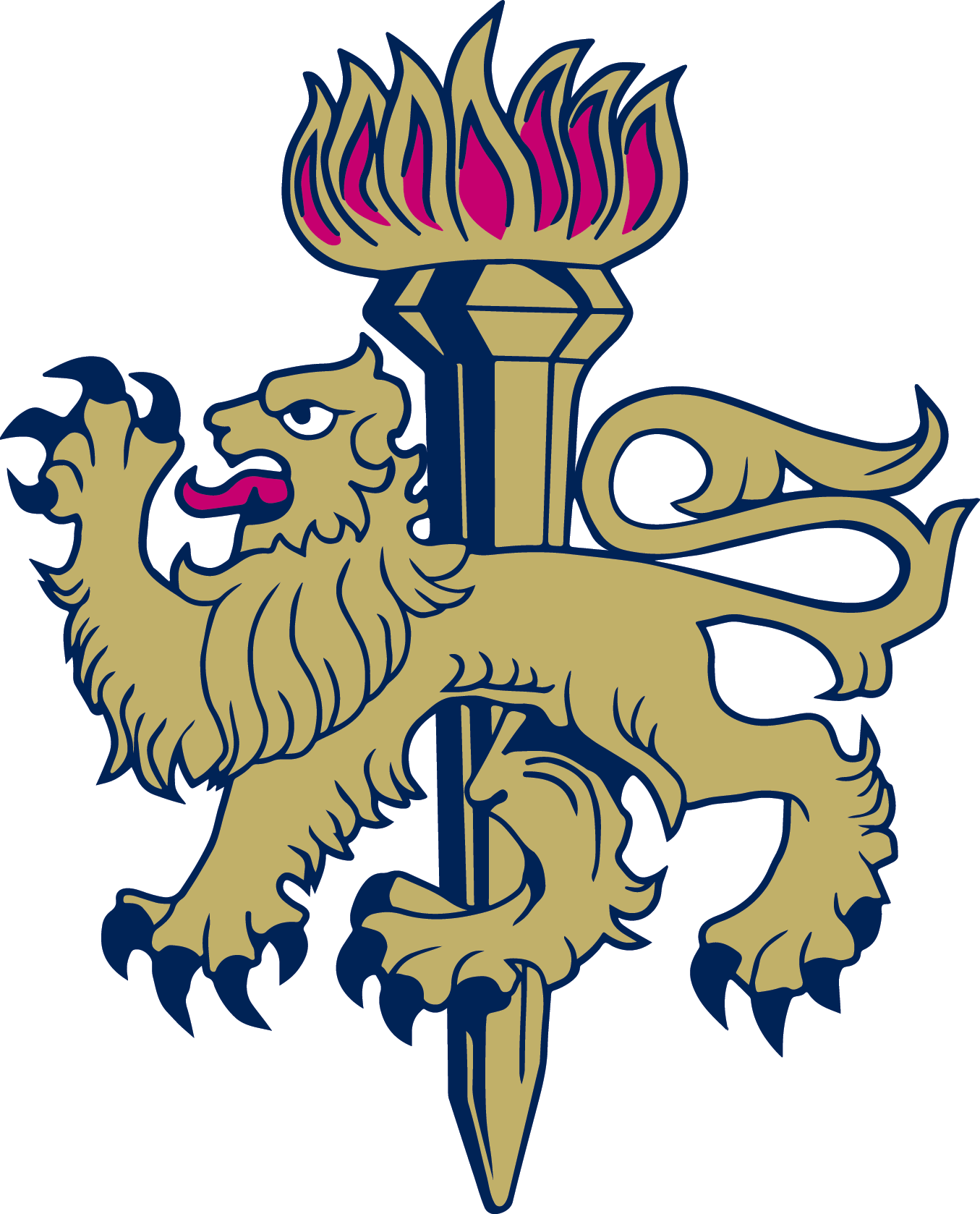
School crest

==== Girls ====
In the Autumn and Spring terms girls play lacrosse and netball, and in the Summer term they play cricket and athletics.

==== Boys ====
In the Autumn and Spring terms boys play rugby union and football, and in the Summer term they play cricket and athletics.

=== Motto, crest and song ===
The motto, crest and song are all derived from those of Claremont Fan Court's predecessor schools:

- The school motto is “Be Strong in Understanding” which recognises Fan Court School's original motto "Be Strong".
- The school crest combines a lion and torch. This references the original crests with the torch from Claremont School and the lion from Fan Court School.
- The School song is titled “Nisi Dominus Frustra” which was the original motto of Claremont School. The words are by Phyllis M. Cooper and the music by Fenella Farrar (Bennetts).

== Christian Science ==
The school was founded by Christian Scientists, although it has no formal connection with the Christian Science Church. In its beginning, having a knowledge of The Principia inspired the founders as well. The 2007 Independent Schools Inspectorate Report details the School as Christian Science; however, the 2011 Independent Schools Inspectorate Interim Report only states that the school was founded by Christian Scientists. The financial accounts for the year ending 31 July 2013 filed with the Charity Commission for England and Wales state that all members of the Foundation Council, from whom the Trustees and Governors are selected, must be practising Christian Scientists, and that senior staff are expected to have strong affinity with and understanding of Christian Science.

== Alumni ==
=== Notable pupils ===
- Fin Baxter, English professional rugby union player who plays for Premiership club Harlequins
- Joyce Grenfell, OBE, English actress, comedian, monologist and singer-songwriter
- James Hamilton, 4th Baron Hamilton of Dalzell (1938–2006), stockbroker and Conservative peer
- Anthea McIntyre, Conservative Member of the European Parliament
- Miles Millar, screenwriter and producer
- Anne Sebba, British biographer, writer, lecturer and journalist
- Kate Staples, British female former pole vaulter and regular gladiator of Gladiators
- Michaela Strachan, television presenter
- Alastair Willis, Grammy-nominated conductor and music director
- Sarah Willis (hornist), a British French horn player and TV presenter
- Angela Conner FRSS - Leading English sculptor.
- Robin Denys Gill, KCVO - Retired British businessman, investor, and television and charity executive. Founder of the Royal Anniversary Trust, subsequently served as Chairman of Executive and Chairman.
- Matthew Needham - Actor
- John Huxtable Elliott FBA - British historian and hispanist who was Regius Professor Emeritus at the University of Oxford
- Giles Stille - English former professional football player and current manager of Swedish club team, Assyriska
- Moorad Choudhry - formerly Head of Business Treasury, Global Banking and Markets at Royal Bank of Scotland
- Christiana Figueres – Environmental campaigner, former UN and Costa Rican diplomat, former Executive Secretary of the United Nations Framework Convention on Climate Change
- Alice Arnold - Broadcaster and journalist
- Clare Francis MBE - British novelist and yachtswoman
- Malcolm Erskine, 17th Earl of Buchan - Peer of Scotland and member of the House of Lords
- John C. Wilkinson - Emeritus Fellow of St Hugh’s College, Oxford University in Islamic Studies
- Archibald Gavin Hamilton, Baron Hamilton of Epsom, PC - Conservative party politician and Minister of State for the Armed Forces (1988-1993)
- Ian Todd - former British alpine skier who competed in the 1968 Winter Olympics
- Ruth Packer- English operatic soprano.

=== Notable staff ===
- Violet S. Hay, hymnist, was involved in founding the school
- Jemma Rose (1992), English footballer who played for FA WSL club Arsenal, winning her first senior cap for England in November 2015
- Debra Searle (1975), adventurer, television presenter, and author
- Hayley Tullett (1973), Olympic middle-distance runner
- Michael Basman - English chess player, chess author and International Master.

== National Trust ==
The National Trust acquired 50 acres (200,000 m^{2}) of the Claremont estate in 1949. In 1975, with a grant from the Slater Foundation, it set about restoring the eighteenth-century landscape garden. Claremont Landscape Garden displays the successive contributions of the landscape gardeners who worked on it: Sir John Vanbrugh, Charles Bridgman, William Kent and Capability Brown.

== See also ==
- Claremont (country house)
