= Claremont Landscape Garden =

Historic landscape garden in Surrey, England

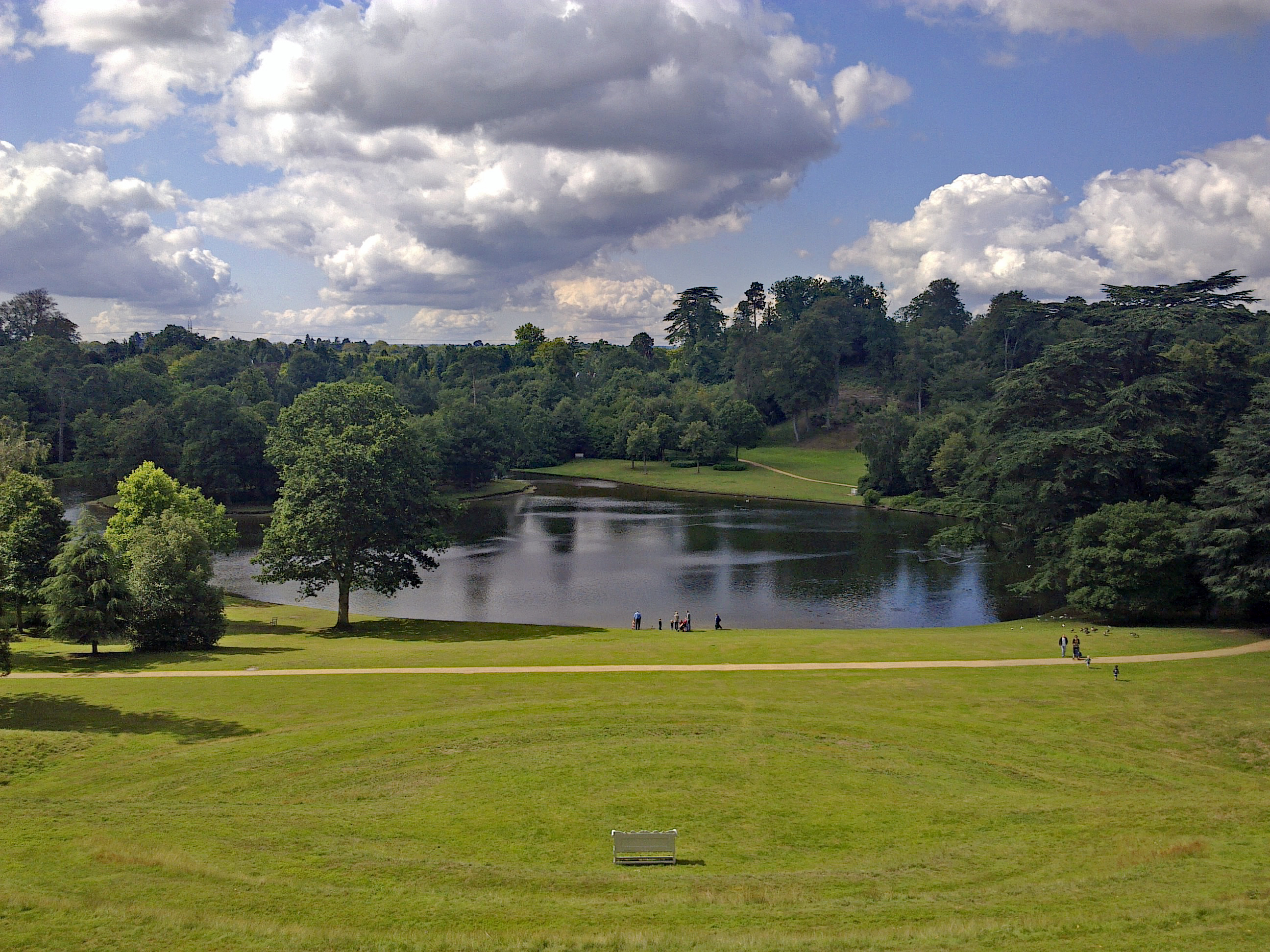
- Lake and amphitheatre (left)

- Location within Surrey
- Interactive map of Claremont Landscape Garden
- Type: English garden
- Location: Elmbridge, Surrey
- Coordinates: 51°21′28″N 0°22′41″W
- Area: 49 acres (20 ha)
- Created: 1715-1727
- Operator: National Trust
- Open: All year round
- Designation: Grade I

Claremont Landscape Garden, just outside Esher, Surrey, England, is one of the earliest surviving gardens of its kind of landscape design, the English Landscape Garden — still featuring its original 18th-century layout. The garden is Grade I listed on the Register of Historic Parks and Gardens.

== History ==
Originally created for Claremont House, it represents the work of some of the best known landscape gardeners, such as Charles Bridgeman, Capability Brown, William Kent and Sir John Vanbrugh.

Work on the gardens began around 1715 and by 1727 they were described as "the noblest of any in Europe". Within the grounds, overlooking the lake, is an unusual-turfed amphitheatre, which used to form the centrepiece of an annual event called the Claremont Fête champêtre. Hundreds of visitors descended on Claremont, most in costume (each year has a different theme) to enjoy four days of music, theatre and fireworks.

== Stewardship ==
Also within the grounds is the Belvedere Tower, designed by Sir John Vanbrugh for the Duke of Newcastle. The tower is unusual in that what appear to be windows, are actually bricks painted black and white. It is now owned by Claremont Fan Court School, which is situated alongside the gardens.

In 1949 the landscape garden was donated to the National Trust for stewardship and protection. Initially it was managed by Esher Urban District Council, who could do little more than basic maintenance and grass-cutting. In 1974, the National Trust took back control of the site and a pioneering restoration programme was launched in 1975 following a significant donation by the Slater Foundation.

== Gallery ==
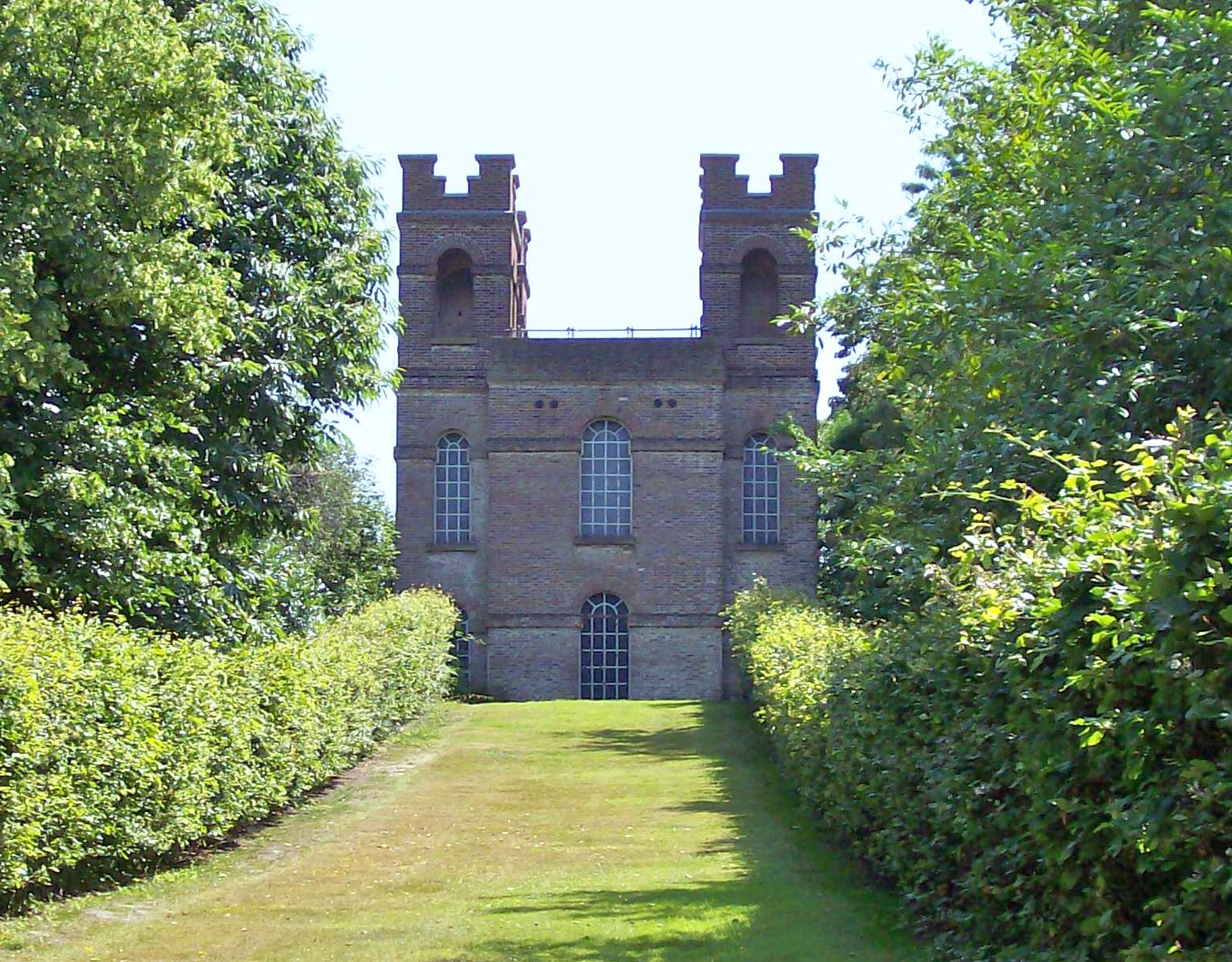
Belvedere Tower

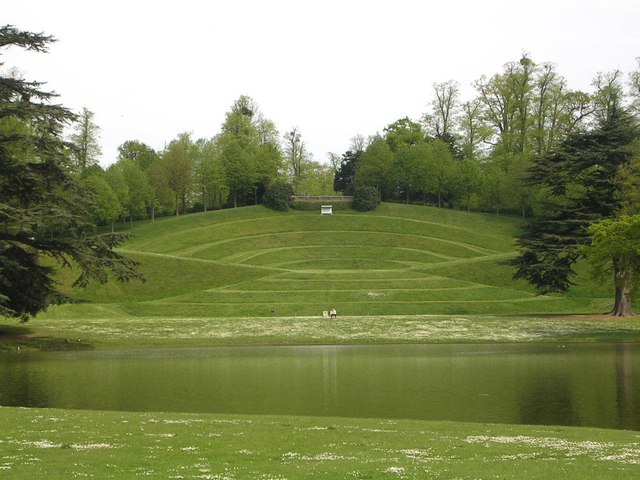
The amphitheatre

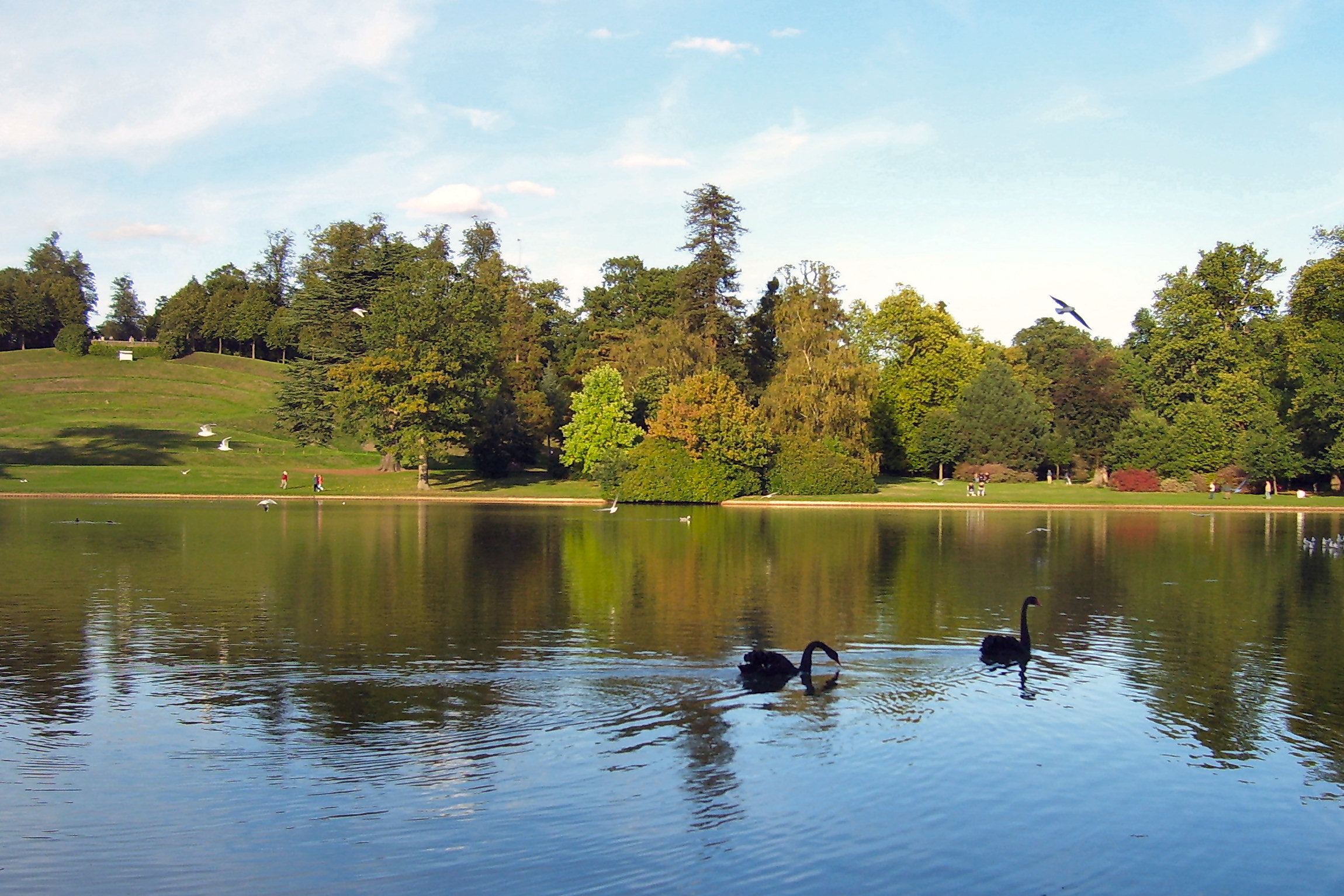
The amphitheatre from the lake

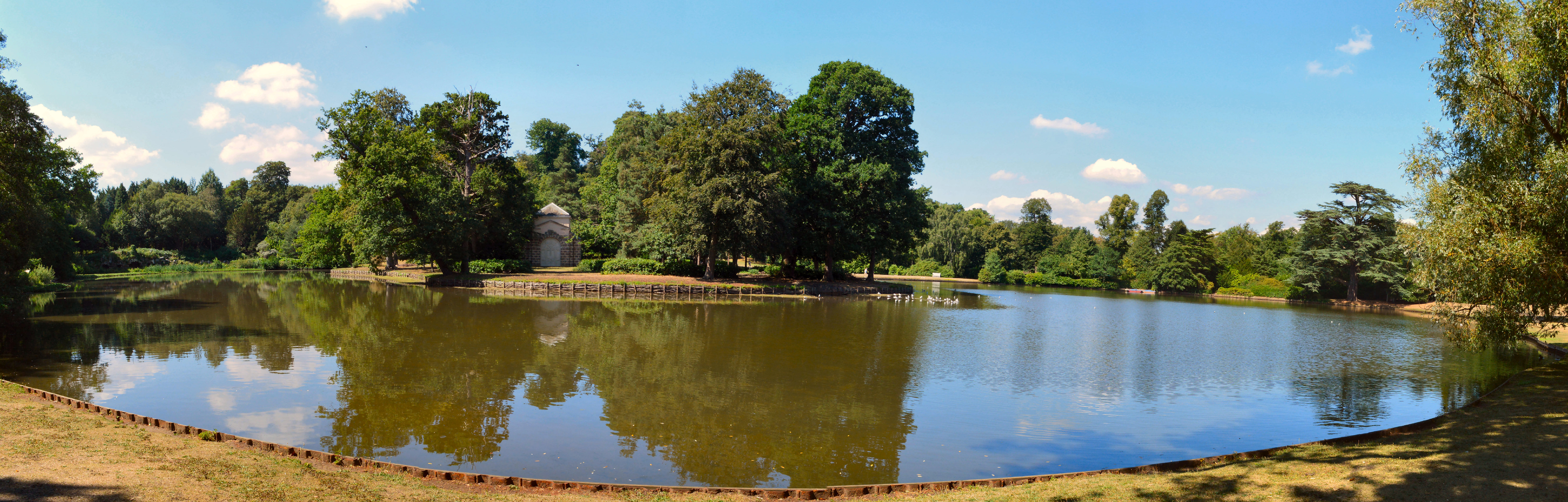
View of the lake

== Transport ==
The entrance to the garden is directly off the A307, Portsmouth Road. Buses from Kingston on Thames, Esher and Guildford stop nearby. The road originally ran closer to the lake but Robert Clive had it moved further north to its present alignment in 1771.

== Bibliography ==
- Turner, Roger, Capability Brown and the Eighteenth Century English Landscape, 2nd ed. Phillimore, Chichester, 1999, pp. 115– 118.

== See also ==
- English Garden
