= Claremont (country house) =

Claremont House and Estate
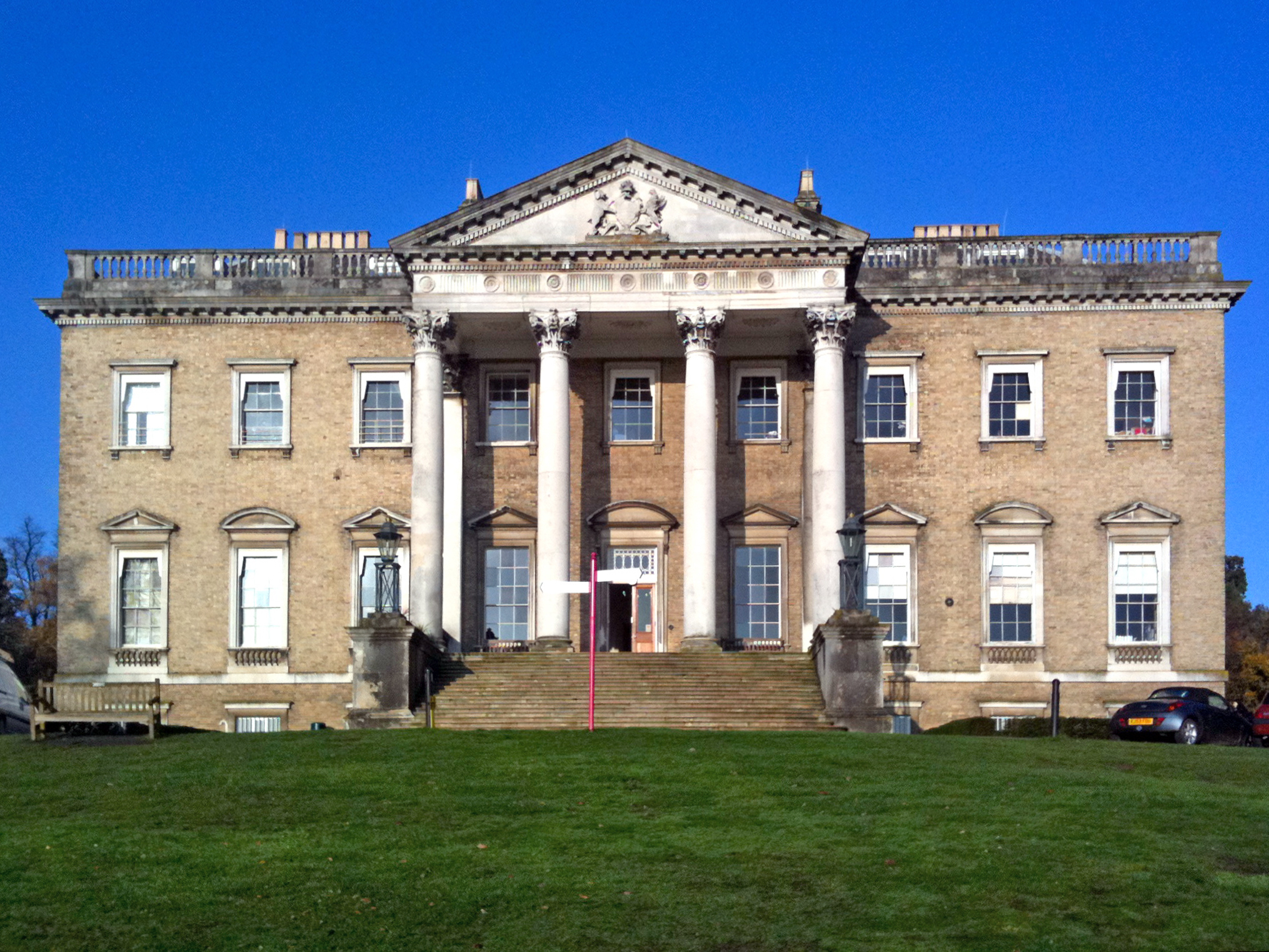
- Façade of Claremont House

- Location within Surrey
- 51°21′28″N 0°22′20″W
- Type: Country House
- Location: Esher, Elmbridge, Surrey
- OS grid reference: TQ1333363470

History
- Built: 1774

Site notes
- Architect(s): Lancelot "Capability" Brown; Henry Holland
- Architectural style: Palladian
- Owner: House: Claremont Fan Court School; Gardens: National Trust

Listed Building – Grade I
- Official name: Claremont House
- Designated: 14 August 1953
- Reference no.: 1030202

National Register of Historic Parks and Gardens
- Official name: Claremont
- Designated: 1 June 1984
- Reference no.: 1000324

Claremont, also known historically as 'Clermont', is an 18th-century Palladian mansion less than a mile south of the centre of Esher in Surrey, England. The buildings are now occupied by Claremont Fan Court School, and its landscaped gardens are owned and managed by the National Trust. Claremont House is a Grade I listed building.

== Claremont estate ==
The first house on the Claremont estate was built in 1708 by Sir John Vanbrugh, the Restoration playwright and architect of Blenheim Palace and Castle Howard, for his own use. This "very small box", as he described it, stood on the level ground in front of the present mansion. At the same time, he built the stables and the walled gardens, also probably White Cottage, which is now the Sixth Form Centre of Claremont Fan Court School.

In 1714, he sold the house to the wealthy Whig politician Thomas Pelham-Holles, Earl of Clare, who later became Duke of Newcastle and served twice as Prime Minister. The Earl commissioned Vanbrugh to add two great wings to the house and to build a fortress-like turret on an adjoining knoll. From this so-called "prospect-house", or belvedere, he and his guests could admire the views of the Surrey countryside as they took refreshments and played hazard, a popular dice game.

In the clear eighteenth-century air it was apparently possible to see Windsor Castle and St Paul's Cathedral therefrom. The Earl of Clare named his country seat Clare-mount, later contracted to Claremont. The two lodges at the Copsem Lane entrance were added at this time.

== Landscape garden ==
Claremont landscape garden is one of the earliest surviving gardens of its kind of landscape design, the English Landscape Garden — still featuring its original 18th-century layout. The extensive landscaped grounds of Claremont represents the work of some of the best known landscape gardeners, Charles Bridgeman, Capability Brown, William Kent (with Thomas Greening) and Sir John Vanbrugh.

Work on the gardens began around 1715 and, by 1727, they were described as "the noblest of any in Europe". Within the grounds, overlooking the lake, is an unusual turfed amphitheatre.

A feature in the grounds is the Belvedere Tower, designed by Vanbrugh for the Duke of Newcastle. The tower is unusual in that, what appear to be windows, are actually bricks painted black and white. It is now owned by Claremont Fan Court School, which is situated alongside the gardens.

In 1949, the landscape garden was donated to the National Trust for stewardship and protection. A restoration programme was launched in 1975 following a significant donation by the Slater Foundation. The garden is Grade I listed on the Register of Historic Parks and Gardens.

== Capability Brown's mansion, built for Lord Clive of India ==
The Duke of Newcastle died in 1768 and, in 1769, his widow sold the estate to Robert Clive, 1st Baron Clive, founder of Britain's Indian Empire. Although the great house was then little more than fifty years old, it was aesthetically and politically out of fashion. Lord Clive decided to demolish the house and commissioned Capability Brown to build the present Palladian mansion on higher and dryer ground. Brown, more accomplished as a landscape designer than an architect, took on his future son-in-law Henry Holland as a junior partner owing to the scale of the project. John Soane was employed in Holland's office at this time and worked on the project as a draftsman and junior designer. Holland's interiors for Claremont owe much to the contemporary work of Robert Adam.

Lord Clive, by now a rich Nabob, is reputed to have spent over £100,000 on rebuilding the house and the complete remodelling of the celebrated pleasure ground. However, Lord Clive ended up never living at the property, as he died in 1774—the year that the house was completed. The estate then passed through a rapid succession of owners; first being sold "for not more than one third of what the house and alterations had cost" to Robert Monckton-Arundell, 4th Viscount Galway, and then to George Carpenter, 2nd Earl of Tyrconnell, and finally to Charles Ellis, 1st Baron Seaford.

A large map entitled "Claremont Palace", situated in what is called "Clive's room" inside the mansion, shows the mansion and its surrounding grounds; giving a detailed overview of the campus. The map probably dates back to the 1860s, when the mansion was frequently occupied by Queen Victoria (thus it having been christened "palace"). However, the exact date is still unknown. The relief in Claremont's front pediment is of Clive's coat of arms impaled with that of Maskelyne, his wife's family.

== Royal residence ==
Claremont Estate Purchase (Grant of Life Interest) Act 1816
- Act of Parliament
- Parliament of the United Kingdom
- Long title: An act for ratifying the Purchase of the Claremont Estate, and for settling the same as a Residence for Her Royal Highness the Princess Charlotte Augusta and His Serene Highness Leopold George Frederick Prince of Cobourg of Saalfeld.
- Citation: 56 Geo. 3. c. 115
- Territorial extent: United Kingdom

Dates
- Royal assent: 1 July 1816
- Commencement: 1 July 1816 (Note: The Acts of Parliament (Commencement) Act 1793.)
- Repealed: 16 June 1977
Other legislation
Repealed by	Statute Law (Repeals) Act 1977

Status: Repealed

Text of statute as originally enacted

In 1816, Claremont was bought by the British Nation through an Act of Parliament as a wedding present for the Prince Regent's daughter Princess Charlotte and her husband Prince Leopold of Saxe-Coburg. At that time, the estate was valued to Parliament at £60,000: "Mr Huskisson stated that it had been agreed to purchase the house and demesnes of Clermont... The valuation of the farms, farm-houses, and park, including 350 acres of land, was 36,000/; the mansion, 19,000/; and the furniture, 6,000/; making together 60,000/. The mansion, which is in good repair, could not be built now for less than 91,000/." To the nation's great sorrow, however, Princess Charlotte, who was second in line to the throne, was, after two miscarriages, to die there after giving birth to a stillborn son in November the following year. This sorrow is expressed in Letitia Elizabeth Landon's poem "Lines on the Mausoleum of the Princess Charlotte, at Claremont", published in Forget Me Not in 1824. Although Leopold retained ownership of Claremont until his death in 1865, he left the house in 1831 when he became the first King of the Belgians.

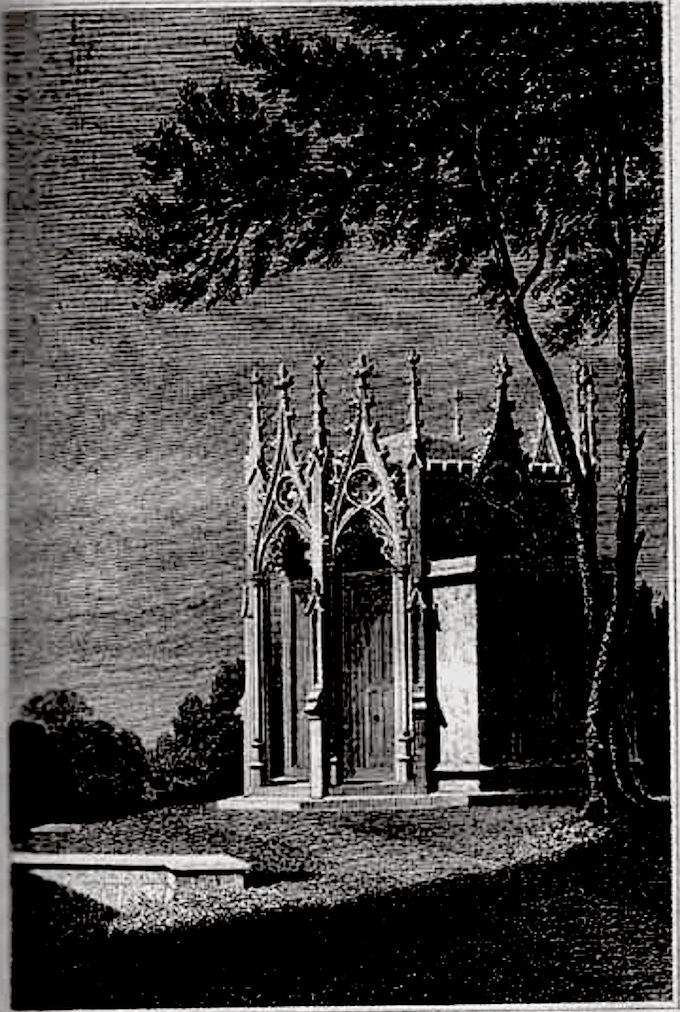
Mausoleum of Princess Charlotte

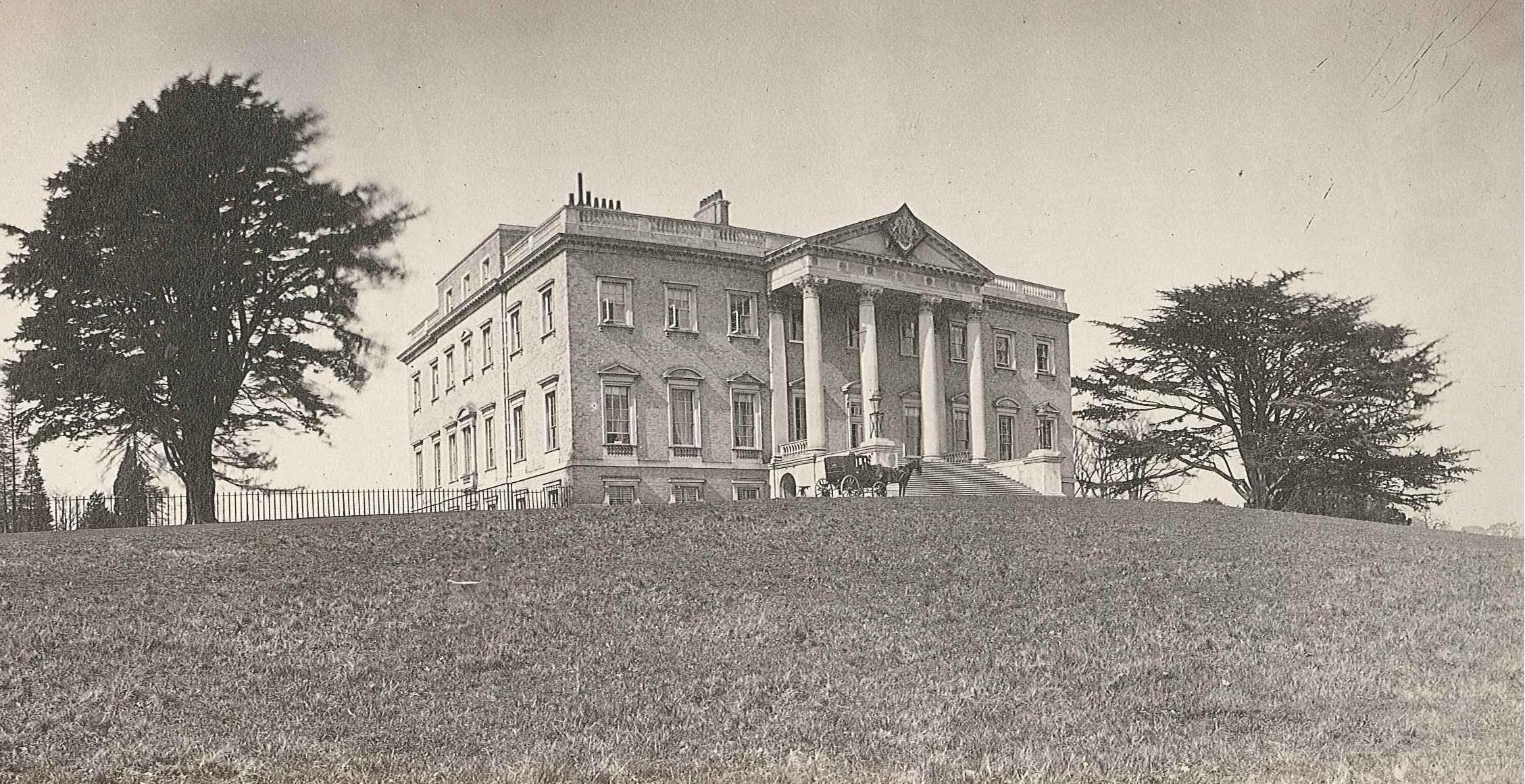
Claremont House, ca. 1860

Queen Victoria was a frequent visitor to Claremont—both as a child and later as an adult—when Leopold, her doting uncle, lent her the house. She, in turn, lent the house to the exiled French King and Queen, Louis-Philippe I and Maria Amalia (the parents-in-law of Leopold I of Belgium), after the Revolutions of 1848. The exiled King died at Claremont in 1850.

In 1857, Offenbach and his Bouffes company performed three of his opéras bouffes there for Marie Amelie and her sons during an eight-week tour of England.

In 1870, Queen Victoria commissioned Francis John Williamson to sculpt a marble memorial to Charlotte and Leopold which was erected inside the house. (The memorial was subsequently moved to St George's Church, Esher.)

Victoria bought Claremont for her fourth, and youngest, son Prince Leopold, Duke of Albany, when he married Princess Helena of Waldeck and Pyrmont in 1882. The Duke and Duchess of Albany had two children—Alice and Charles. Charles, who had been born at Claremont in 1884, inherited the title and position of Duke of Saxe-Coburg and Gotha upon the death of his uncle, Alfred, Duke of Saxe-Coburg and Gotha, in 1900. He moved to the duchy in Germany to take the throne, becoming a German citizen, and renouncing his claim in the British succession.

Claremont should have passed to Charles upon his mother's death in 1922, but because he served as a German general in the First World War, the British government disallowed the inheritance. Claremont was accordingly confiscated and sold by the Public Trustee to shipping magnate Sir William Corry, director of the Cunard Line. Two years after Sir William's death, in 1926, it was bought by Eugen Spier, a wealthy German financier.

In 1930, Claremont stood empty and was marked for demolition when it was bought, together with the Belvedere, the stables, and 30 acres (12 ha) of parkland, by the Governors of a south London school, later renamed Claremont School and, since 1978, has been known as Claremont Fan Court School.

== The National Trust ==
The National Trust acquired 50 acres (0.20 km^{2}) of the Claremont estate in 1949. In 1975, with a grant from the Slater Foundation, it set about restoring the eighteenth-century landscape garden. The Claremont Landscape Garden now displays the successive contributions of the great landscape gardeners who worked on it: Sir John Vanbrugh, Charles Bridgeman, William Kent, and Capability Brown.

== Filming ==
The house was used, as Loam Hall, in the 1957 film The Admirable Crichton.

== See also ==
- A307, Portsmouth Road
- Claremont Fan Court School
- Claremont Landscape Garden
- St. George's Church, Esher

== Bibliography ==
- Turner, Roger, Capability Brown and the Eighteenth Century English Landscape, 2nd ed. Phillimore, Chichester, 1999, pp. 115–118.
