= The Journal of Structured Finance =

- Discipline: Finance, investment
- Language: English

Publication details
- Former names: The Journal of Project Finance, The Journal of Structured and Project Finance
- History: 1999–present
- Publisher: Euromoney Institutional Investor
- Frequency: Quarterly

Standard abbreviations
- ISO 4: J. Struct. Finance

Indexing
- ISSN: 1082-3220
- LCCN: 2004212529
- OCLC no.: 58648992

Links
- Journal homepage

The Journal of Structured Finance is a non-accredited quarterly journal on structuring and investing in all types of structured finance, such as asset-backed securities, mortgage-backed securities, collateralized debt and loan obligations, and life settlements. The journal was originally established as The Journal of Project Finance, then broadened its focus as The Journal of Structured and Project Finance, before finally obtaining its current name in 2004. It is the only international, peer-reviewed journal devoted to empirical analysis and practical guidance on structured finance instruments, techniques, and strategies. JSF covers a wide range of topics including credit derivatives and synthetic securitization, secondary trading in the CDO market, securitization in emerging markets, trends in major consumer loan categories, accounting, regulatory, and tax issues in the structured finance industry.

Topics of interest include structuring techniques, types of securitization, investment approaches, and sector research. The editor is Mark H. Adelson.
