= Stefan Mittnik =

German economist (born 1954)

- Education: Technische Universität Berlin; University of Sussex; Washington University in St. Louis
- Known for: Research in financial econometrics, heavy-tailed distributions, financial risk modelling, and co-founding Scalable Capital
- Scientific career
- Fields: Econometrics, financial econometrics, time series analysis, risk management
- Workplaces: LMU Munich; Kiel University; Stony Brook University
- Thesis: (1987)

Stefan Mittnik is a German economist and econometrician. From 2003 until his retirement in 2020, he held the Chair of Financial Econometrics at LMU Munich, where he also coordinated the Center for Quantitative Risk Analysis (CEQURA). His work has focused on econometrics, empirical finance, time-series analysis, and financial risk management. He is a co-founder of Scalable Capital, a German digital investment platform.

== Education ==
Mittnik earned a degree in industrial engineering from Technische Universität Berlin in 1981, followed by an MA in development economics from the University of Sussex. He received a PhD in economics and applied mathematics from Washington University in St. Louis in 1987.

== Academic career ==
After receiving his PhD in 1987, Mittnik taught at Stony Brook University in New York. In 1994, he moved to Kiel University, where he held the chair in statistics and empirical economics before moving to LMU Munich in 2003.

Mittnik became dean of Kiel University's Faculty of Economic and Social Sciences on 1 August 2001 and was still serving in the position in March 2002.

In 2003, Mittnik moved to LMU Munich as professor of financial econometrics, where he also served as coordinator of the Center for Quantitative Risk Analysis (CEQURA). He is listed as a professor emeritus of LMU Munich, a fellow of the Center for Financial Studies in Frankfurt and the CESifo Research Network, and an affiliated researcher at Texas Tech University.

During the 2000s, Mittnik also served as research director at the ifo Institute for Economic Research and directed the risk management program at the Center for Financial Studies in Frankfurt.

He was dean of the Faculty of Mathematics, Computer Science and Statistics in 2006 and 2007.

Mittnik retired from his professorship at LMU Munich in 2020 and became Professor Emeritus. Following retirement, he remained active in research through the CESifo Research Network and continued contributing to scholarship in financial econometrics, systemic risk, climate-related financial modeling, and quantitative investment analysis.

Mittnik was elected to the German Research Foundation's review board for statistics and econometrics in 2003 and again in 2007. In 2008, the Deutsche Bundesbank appointed him to its research council.

Mittnik served on the Economics Review Board of the German Research Foundation (DFG) and was elected to the organization’s review board for statistics and econometrics in multiple terms. In 2008, he was appointed to the Research Council of the Deutsche Bundesbank, where he contributed to research oversight and policy-related economic analysis.

He has served on the supervisory board of Union Investment, one of Germany’s largest asset-management companies, and on the editorial boards of several academic journals in econometrics, finance, and quantitative economics.

Mittnik was also coordinator of the Center for Quantitative Risk Analysis (CEQURA) at LMU Munich and became a fellow of the Center for Financial Studies in Frankfurt and the CESifo Research Network.

== Scalable Capital ==
In 2014, Mittnik co-founded Scalable Capital. In a 2018 interview, co-founder Erik Podzuweit said that Mittnik developed the company's investment algorithm, served as its academic adviser, and helped recruit early members of its financial-engineering team. As of 2019, Mittnik held a 5.5% stake in Scalable Capital.

== Research and scholarship ==
Mittnik’s research focuses on financial econometrics, empirical finance, time-series analysis, risk management, portfolio optimization, and macro-financial interactions. His work has been particularly associated with the application of non-Gaussian and heavy-tailed statistical models to financial markets, challenging traditional assumptions that financial returns follow normal probability distributions.

A recurring theme in Mittnik’s scholarship has been the modeling of financial risk under extreme market conditions. Much of his research examined stable Paretian distributions, fat-tailed return behavior, downside-risk forecasting, Value at Risk (VaR), Expected Shortfall, and portfolio allocation under asymmetric risk structures. His work contributed to the development of quantitative approaches for measuring and managing financial market risk beyond traditional variance-based frameworks.

Mittnik also conducted influential research on multivariate time-series analysis, state-space modeling, macroeconomic forecasting, nonlinear econometric models, and financial market volatility. His publications explored forecasting methodologies for economic and financial systems, including studies on banking-sector fragility, systemic financial stress, credit-market interactions, and macroeconomic instability.

During the 2010s, his research increasingly focused on the relationship between financial systems and broader economic outcomes, including climate-disaster risk, green-economy transitions, labor-market interactions, and financial-sector shocks. His work on climate-related macroeconomic risk examined the economic consequences of environmental disruptions and financial-system vulnerability.

Mittnik has authored or co-authored several books and monographs in econometrics and finance. His major works include ''Stable Paretian Modeling in Finance'' (2000), co-authored with Svetlozar T. Rachev, which examined the use of stable distributions in financial modeling; ''Financial Econometrics'' (2007), co-authored with Frank J. Fabozzi, Sergio M. Focardi, Teo Jasic, and Rachev, which became a widely cited reference text on quantitative financial analysis; and the statistical textbooks Deskriptive Statistik and Schließende Statistik (both 2005), written with Michael Missong.

In addition to monographs, Mittnik edited numerous scholarly volumes and special journal issues devoted to financial risk management, econometric modeling, stable distributions, and quantitative finance. His research has appeared in journals including the ''Journal of Econometrics'', ''Journal of Banking and Finance'', ''Journal of Economic Dynamics and Control'', ''International Journal of Forecasting'', ''Journal of Forecasting'', ''Journal of the Royal Statistical Society'', and ''Computational Economics''.

Beyond academic publishing, Mittnik supervised doctoral research in financial econometrics, asset allocation, risk modeling, yield-curve forecasting, and algorithmic finance at LMU Munich. His former doctoral researchers have contributed to fields including quantitative asset management, risk analytics, and financial technology.
