= List of public art in the Royal Borough of Kingston upon Thames =

This is a list of public art in the Royal Borough of Kingston upon Thames.

== Kingston ==
Image	Title / subject	Location and coordinates	Date	Artist / designer	Architect / other	Type	Designation	Notes
More images	Statue of Queen Anne	Market House 51.4097°N 0.3063°W	1706	Francis Bird	Charles Henman	Architectural sculpture	Grade II*	Commissioned for the earlier town hall on this site, and incorporated into its Victorian successor.
More images	Memorial to Henry Shrubsole	Kingston Market Place 51.4094°N 0.3063°W	1882	Francis John Williamson	—N/a	Drinking fountain	Grade II	
More images	Law and Liberty, Peace and Plenty, Justice and Mercy; the arms of Guildford, Godalming, Reigate, Richmond and Kingston; the arms of the Earl of Lovelace, Lord Lieutenant of Surrey, the Royal Arms and the Four Seasons	Surrey County Hall	1893	Farmer & Brindley	Charles Henry Howell	Architectural sculpture	Grade II	
	Woman reading	North side of Kingston Museum, Wheatfield Way	1904	?	Alfred Cox	Architectural sculpture	Grade II	
More images	Kingston upon Thames War Memorial	Union Street 51.4104°N 0.3049°W	1920	Richard Reginald Goulden	Richard Reginald Goulden	War memorial	Grade II*	Unveiled 11 November (Armistice Day) 1923.
More images	Kingston Hill War Memorial	St Paul's Church, Queen's Road, Kingston Hill 51.4179°N 0.2854°W	1922	?	—N/a	Memorial cross	Grade II	Unveiled 22 June 1922.
More images	Memorial Gates East Surrey Regiment	North side of Market Square, leading to All Saints' Church 51.4100°N 0.3061°W	1924	?		Gates	Grade II	Unveiled 9 November (Remembrance Sunday) 1924.
	Bentall coat of arms and reliefs	Façade of Bentall Centre, Clarence Street 51.4111°N 0.3056°W	1930–1932	Eric Gill	Maurice Webb	Architectural sculpture	Grade II	
	Two figures in relief	Façade of Halifax Building Society, Eden Street 51.4104°N 0.30203°W	1935					
	Guildhall Reliefs	Façade of Kingston upon Thames Guildhall	1935	Walter Gilbert				
	Leaping Salmon	100 London Road 51.4104°N 0.2945°W	1980	David Wynne	—N/a	Sculpture	—N/a	From the coat of arms of Kingston.
	Memorial to Sydney Camm	Camm Gardens	1984				—N/a	
	Kings Mural Edward the Elder, Æthelstan, Edmund I, Eadred, Eadwig, Edward the Martyr, Æthelred the Unready	Eden Walk shopping centre, Eden Street 51.4092°N 0.3035°W	1985	Maggie Humphry		Ceramic relief	—N/a	
More images	Out of Order	Old London Road 51.4108°N 0.3005°W	1989	David Mach	—N/a	Sculpture	—N/a	
	River Celebration	Old London Road, at the junction with Queen Elizabeth Road 51.4106°N 0.2973°W	1989	Carole Hodgson	—N/a	Sculpture	—N/a	
	Chessington Mosaic	Clarence Street, near the junction with Wood Street 51.41092°N 0.30557°W	1992	Paul Oakley	Arthur Mann (brick cutter); J. Browne & Co. (paviours)	Mosaic	—N/a	Depicts St Mary's Church, the parish church of Chessington.
	Surbiton Mosaic	Clarence Street, at the junction with Thames Street 51.41085°N 0.30501°W	1992	Paul Oakley	Arthur Mann (brick cutter); J. Browne & Co. (paviours)	Mosaic	—N/a	Depicts the winged lion crest from the coat of arms of the former Borough of Surbiton.
	Kingston Mosaic	Clarence Street, at the junction with Fife Road 51.41088°N 0.30391°W	1992	Paul Oakley	Arthur Mann (brick cutter); J. Browne & Co. (paviours)	Mosaic	—N/a	Depicts the three fishes from the coat of arms of the Royal Borough of Kingston upon Thames.
	Old Malden Mosaic	Clarence Street 51.41079°N 0.30344°W	1992	Paul Oakley	Arthur Mann (brick cutter); J. Browne & Co. (paviours)	Mosaic	—N/a	Depicting the cross and chevrons from the coat of arms of the former Borough of Malden and Coombe.
	New Malden Mosaic	Clarence Street 51.41072°N 0.30293°W	1992	Paul Oakley	Arthur Mann (brick cutter); J. Browne & Co. (paviours)	Mosaic	—N/a	Depicts a beehive, the historic symbol of the district.
	Coombe Mosaic	Fife Road 51.41144°N 0.30382°W	1992	Paul Oakley	Arthur Mann (brick cutter); J. Browne & Co. (paviours)	Mosaic	—N/a	Depicts the heraldic fountain from the coat of arms of the former Borough of Malden and Coombe.
	Flock of Mallard Ducks	Charter Quay	2001	Lloyd Le Blanc	—N/a	Sculpture	—N/a	
	Kingston Railway Station Mosaic	Under Kingston Railway Bridge	2003	Save the World Club				
	Study of Eadweard Muybridge Eadweard Muybridge	Rose Theatre 51.4108°N 0.3019°W	2004	Nicola Benge with volunteers and schoolchildren			—N/a	
	Mosaics	Kingsnympton Estate 51°25′15.53″N 0°16′45.79″W	2004	Save The World Club + ~140 children and adults		Mosaics	—N/a	
	Study of Hundertwasser Friedensreich Hundertwasser	Skerne Road and Canbury Passage 51.4132°N 0.3048°W	2005	Nicola Benge, with 1800 people	—N/a	Mosaic	—N/a	
	Mosaic	John Lewis Kingston 51°24′41.09″N 0°18′28.31″W	2010	Yasha Shrimpton, Howard Grange, members of staff, Save the World Club		Mosaic	—N/a	
	Paper Trail	College Roundabout 51.40704°N 0.30396°W	2012	Michael Antrobus and Tom Kean				
	Colourful Tree, Swing and Cat	12 Queen Elizabeth Road 51.41313°N 0.29624°W	March 2021	Lionel Stanhope		Mural		
	Post Horns	Royal Exchange	2023	Rob Mulholland	—N/a	Sculpture	—N/a	
	Sopwith Camel propeller	Canbury 51°24′48.4″N 0°17′51.2″W						
	Glass disc depicting coat of arms of Tiffin School	Outside Tiffin School, Queen Elizabeth Road						
	Three fishes motif	Bandstand, Canbury Gardens						

== New Malden ==
Image	Title / subject	Location and coordinates	Date	Artist / designer	Type	Designation	Notes
More images	New Malden War Memorial	High Street, outside New Malden Town Hall 51.4024°N 0.2562°W	1924	?	Cenotaph	Grade II	Unveiled 8 November 1924.
	Relief plaques depicting Philosophy, Religion, Sociology, Philology, Natural Science, Applied Science, Fine Arts, Literature and History	New Malden Library, Kingston Road	1941	T Mewburn Crook	Relief	Grade II	
More images	Bronze Family	Tudor Williams department store, 53–59 High Street	1970s	Patricia and Derek Freeborn	Architectural sculpture	—N/a	
	Fountain and lamp	Kingston Road roundabout	1982	Adrian Marchant	Fountain and lamp	—N/a	

== Old Malden ==
Image	Title / subject	Location and coordinates	Date	Artist / designer	Type	Designation	Notes
	Old Malden War Memorial	St John the Baptist's Church, Church Road 51.3821°N 0.2608°W	1923	Stuart Allen (2011 restoration)	Wooden aedicule	Grade II	
	Old Malden Community Mosaic	Malden Manor, Sheephouse Way	2019	Save the World Club, Kim Porrelli	Mosaic		

== Surbiton ==
Image	Title / subject	Location and coordinates	Date	Artist / designer	Type	Designation	Notes
	Relief panels	Surbiton Assembly Rooms, corner of Maple Road, Claremont Gardens and Surbiton Hill	1890s		Reliefs		
More images	King Edward VII Coronation Clock Tower	Claremont Road 51.3942°N 0.3044°W	1905–1906	John Johnson	Clock tower	Grade II	The same architect designed a more elaborate clock tower in Brighton.
More images	Surbiton War Memorial	Ewell Road 51.3925°N 0.2984°W	1921		Memorial cross	Grade II	Unveiled July 1921.
	Transport Panels	50–58 Victoria Road, on wall of Sainsbury's	1980	Henry and Joyce Collins	Mosaics	—N/a	Mosaic panels depicting the history of Surbiton and its transport.
	Mini jumping through wall	Bridge Garage 51.3905°N 0.3079°W			Sculpture	—N/a	

== Tolworth ==
Image	Title / subject	Location and coordinates	Date	Artist / designer	Type	Designation	Notes
	Kingston Coat of Arms	Fishponds Park 51.3868°N 0.2944°W	2004		Sculpture	—N/a	

== Bibliography ==
- Beaumont, Mary Rose (1999). Carole Hodgson. Momentum Books. ISBN 1-902945-01-8.
- Matthews, Peter (2018). London's Statues and Monuments: Revised Edition. Oxford: Shire Publications.
- McCarthy, Julian (2014). Secret Kingston upon Thames. Amberley.
