= Thorpe Camp =

Former RAF barracks

Thorpe Camp Visitor Centre
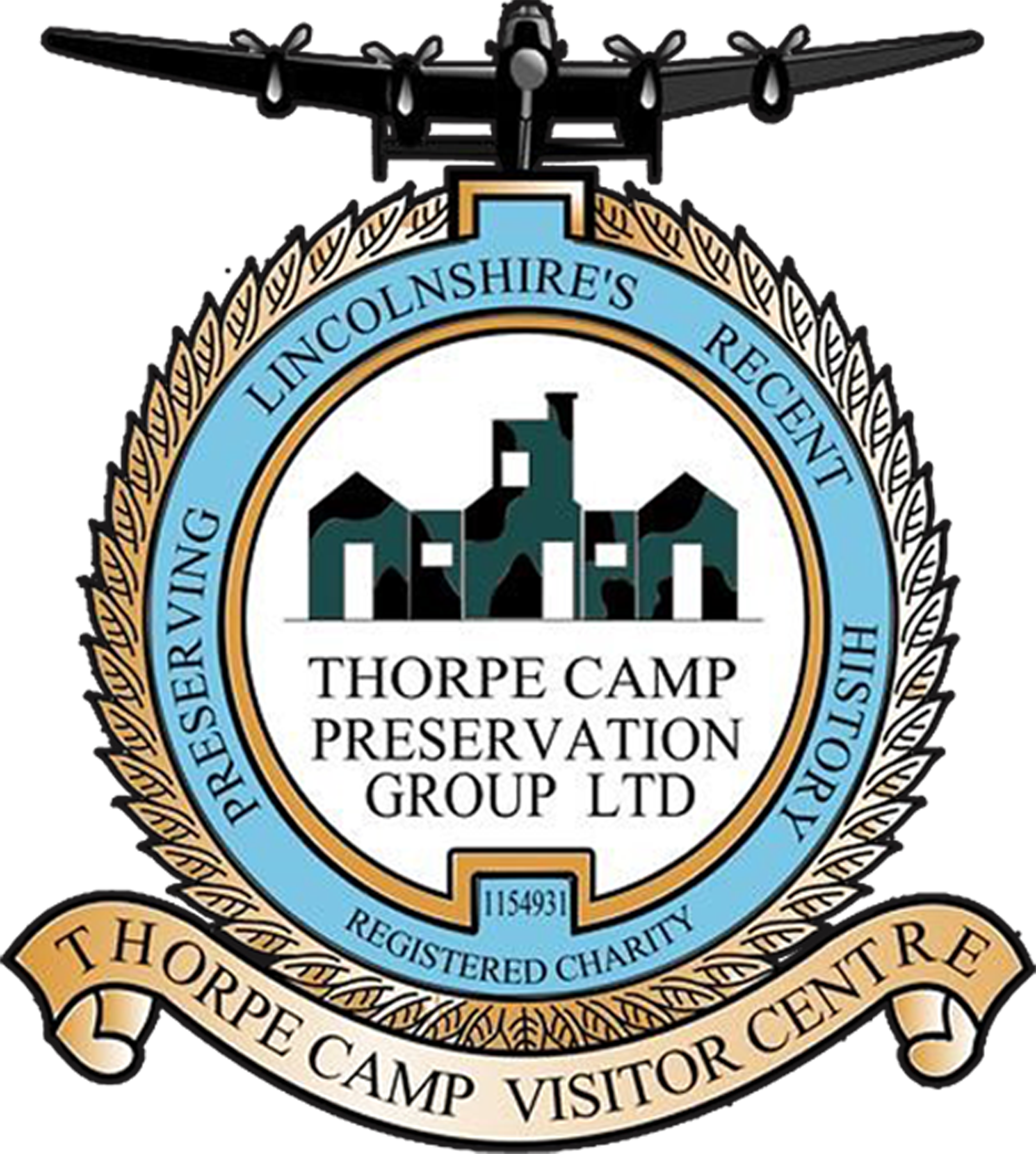
- Thorpe Camp Visitor Centre Crest

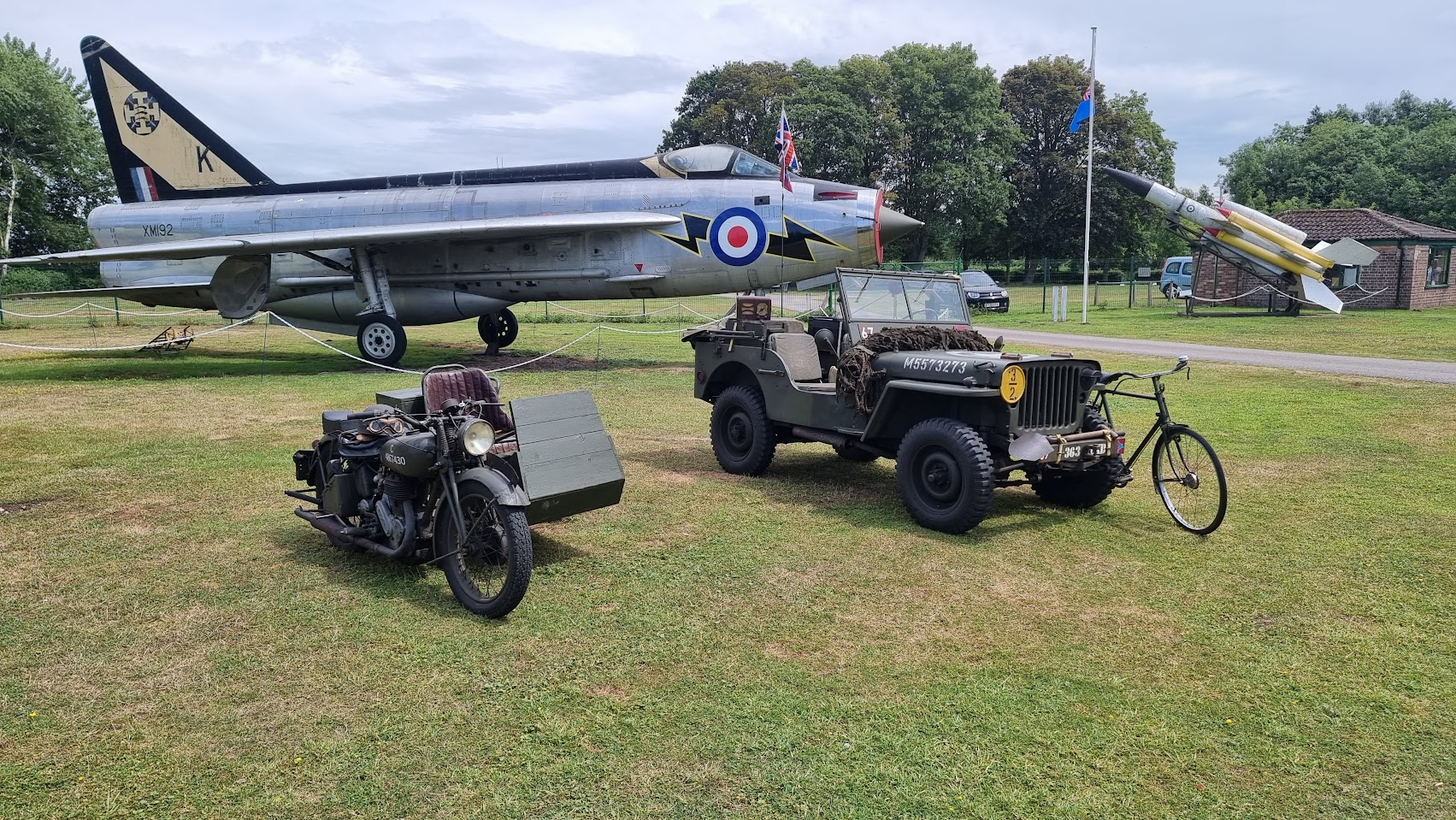
- Former name: RAF Woodhall Spa
- Established: 1988; 38 years ago
- Location: Tattershall Thorpe, Lincolnshire, LN4; United Kingdom
- Coordinates: 53.1205°N 0.1839°W
- Type: Ex-Wartime Barracks
- Directors: Dave Overton - Chair; Lesley Reeson - Vice Chair; John Horn - Artifacts (Joint Directorship)
- Owner: Thorpe Camp Preservation Group Limited
- Parking: On site (no charge)
- Website: thorpecamp.org

Thorpe Camp, officially known as the Thorpe Camp Visitor Centre, is the former Royal Air Force barracks for RAF Woodhall Spa. It is 2.5 miles (4.0 km) southeast of the site of RAF Woodhall Spa, in the civil parish of Tattershall Thorpe. Built in 1940 during the Second World War, the site included Officer, Sergeant and Airman messes, a NAAFI building, ration store, latrines and ablution blocks. The site closed in the 1960s.

By 1987 the site was completely derelict and overgrown. Part of it came with the area acquired by the Woodland trust when they purchased the adjacent Carr Woods. It was the Trust's plan to demolish the buildings that resulted in the formation of the Thorpe Camp Preservation Group to restore the site and create a Visitor Centre.

In 1994 the Visitor Centre opened to the public with a donation entry fee and a very limited area to view. Today the full site is a memorial to the past.

The remaining buildings - the Airman's mess, NAAFI, ablution block, and ration store - are now preserved within the boundaries of the visitor centre, by the Thorpe Camp Preservation Group Limited. The visitor centre commemorates both the Royal Air Force, and RAF Woodhall Spa history, as well as civilian life in Lincolnshire in the 1940s.

== Dedications to RAF Woodhall Spa ==
The visitor centre has various dedications to RAF Woodhall Spa, including a display for each of the squadrons that were either stationed there, or had operations relating to the station. The centre also has a dedication to the Air Training Corps, an organisation that provided training and experience to young people in both World War II, and beyond.

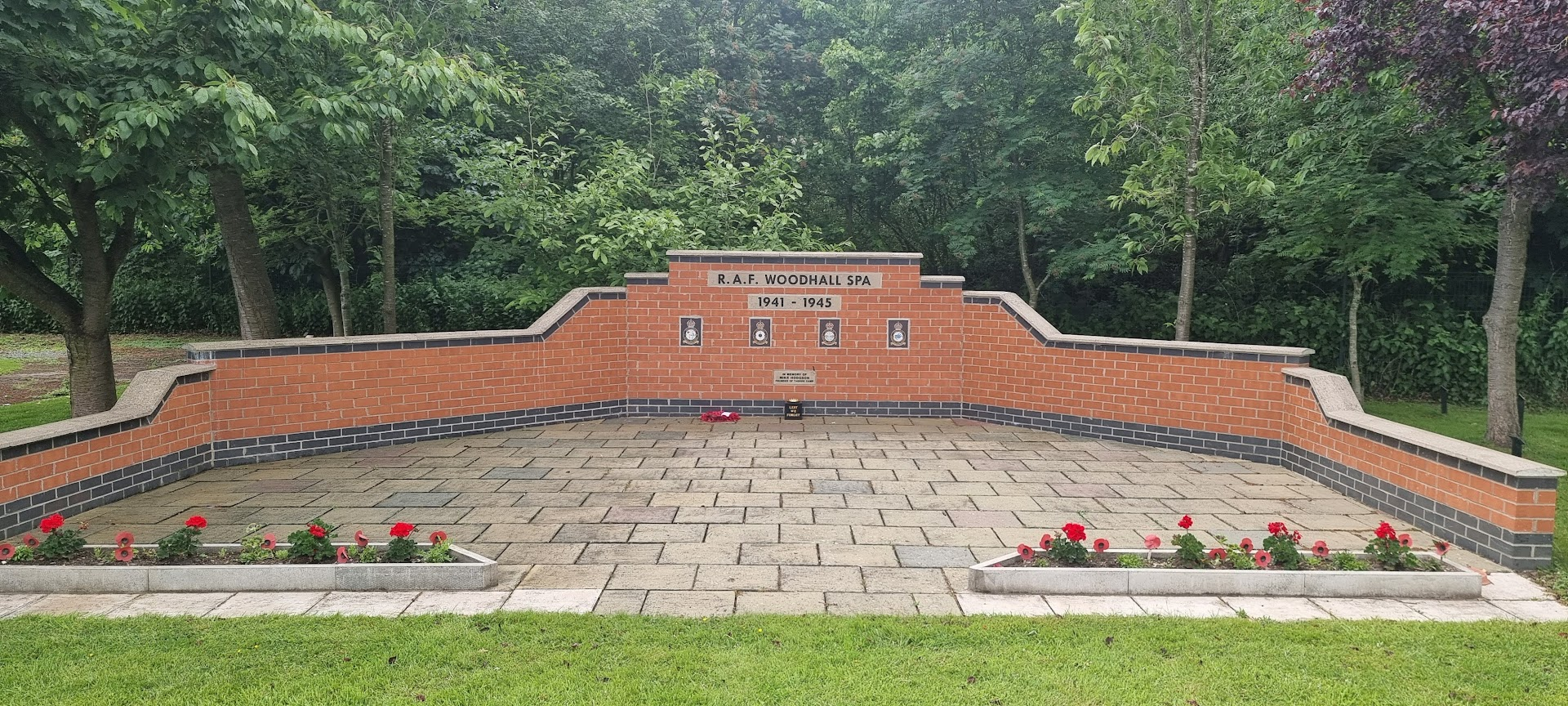
Thorpe Camp Visitor Centre Memorial

=== 97 Squadron ===
97 Squadron was a training squadron based at nearby RAF Waddington during the First World War. The squadron was disbanded on 1 April 1920 after being renumbered, becoming No. 60 Squadron. The squadron was reformed on 16 September 1935 at RAF Catfoss, and later became one of the Pathfinder squadrons in April 1943.

=== 617 Squadron ===
Commonly known as the Dambusters, No. 617 Squadron was the squadron that took part in Operation Chastise in May 1943, destroying Nazi factories, mines, and hydro-electric power stations. 617 Squadron was based at RAF Scampton, but often made use of RAF Woodhall Spa during exercises and missions.

Famously Wing Commander Gibson took off on his final Journey from RAF Woodhall Spa with Squadron Leader Jim Warwick. In Mosquito B.XX KB267 after rejecting reserve aircraft KB213. Sadly both men did not return home.

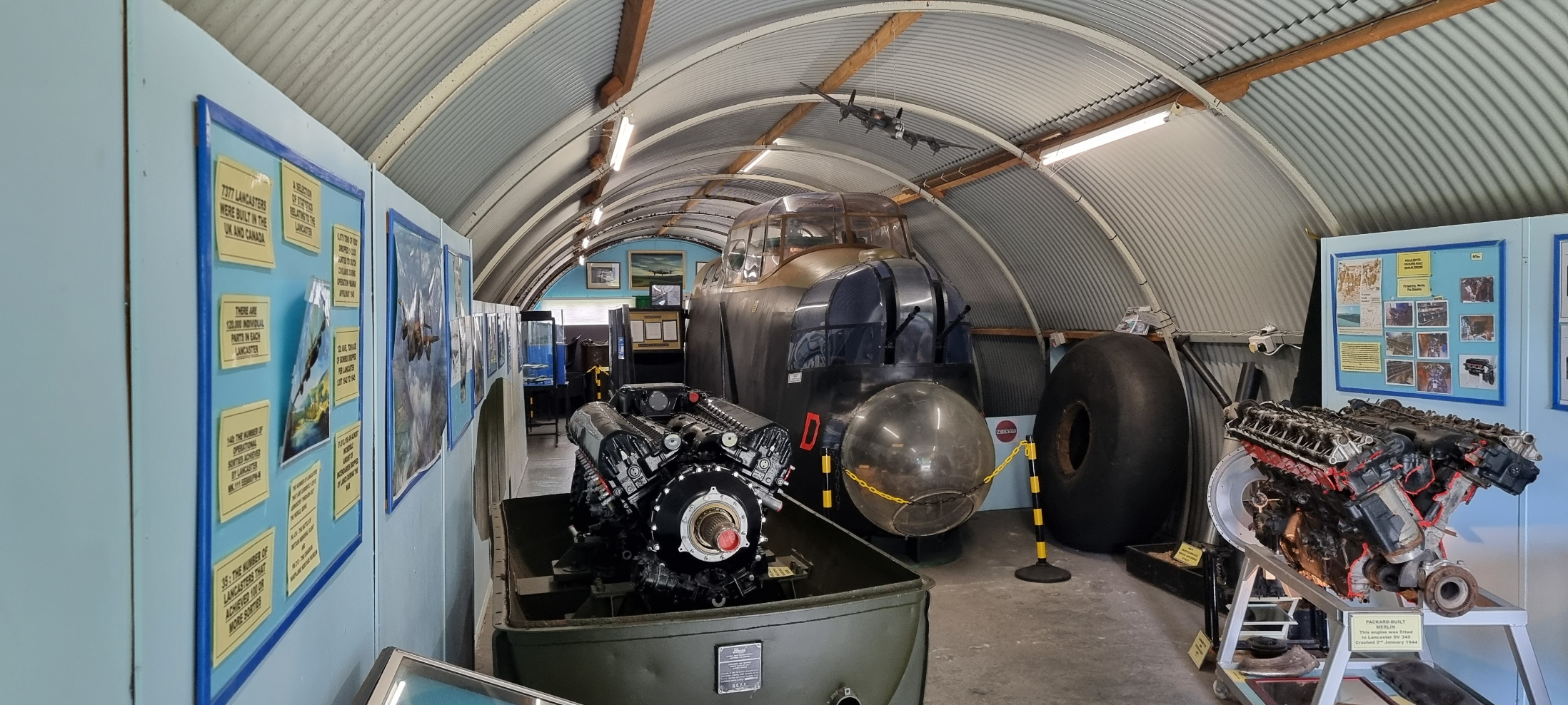
One of the Exhibits at Thorpe Camp The Lancaster Hut

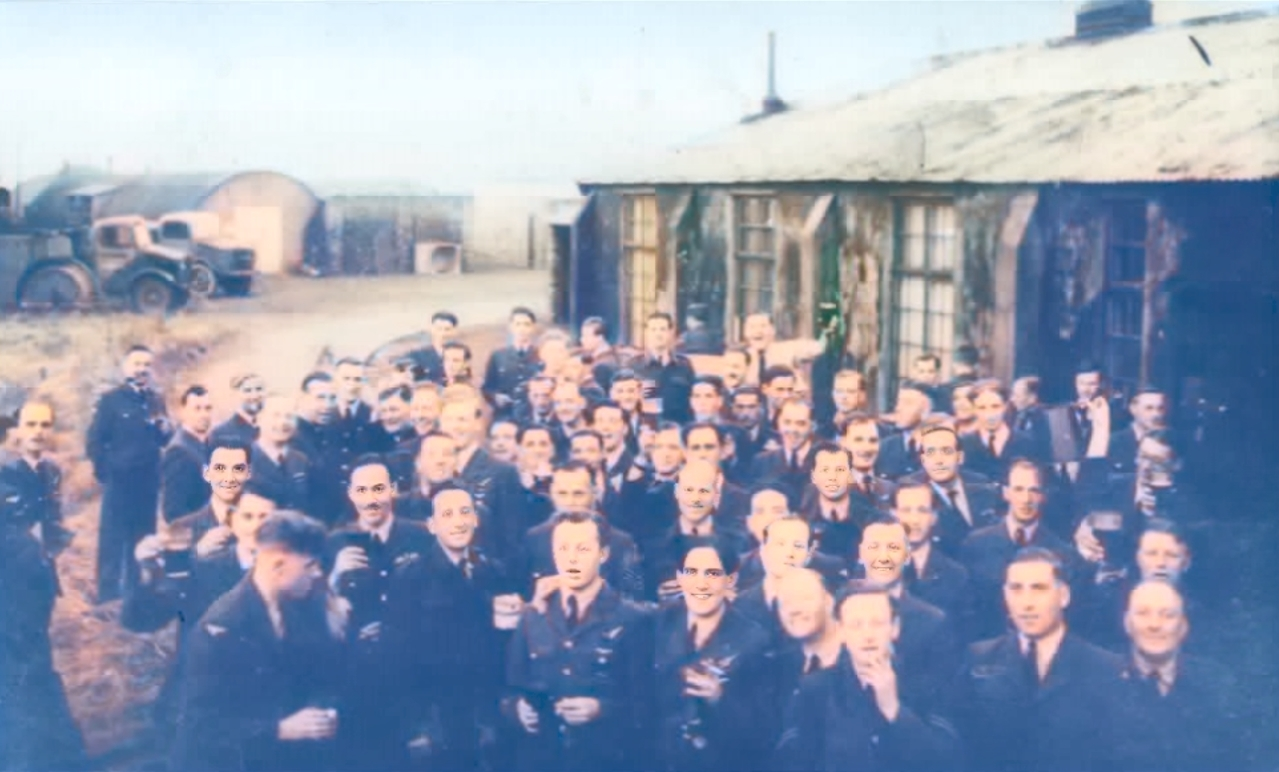
1st June 1945 Celebrations outside the NAAFI on No 1 Communal site to Welcome the new Commanding officer. Wing Commander Clive Scott AFC.

=== 619 Squadron ===
No. 619 Squadron was a Heavy bomber squadron, initially formed at RAF Woodhall Spa on 18 April 1943. The squadron flew the Avro Lancaster, and took place in many bombing raids on Nazi Germany.

=== 627 Squadron ===
No. 627 Squadron alike No. 97 Squadron was a member of the Pathfinder squadrons. It operated from both RAF Oakington and RAF Woodhall Spa throughout the war, as a bomber squadron, reconnaissance and also a specialised target marking squadron.

== Thorpe Camp 1940s Weekend ==
Thorpe Camp hosts an annual, 1940s Weekend on the first full Weekend in July. The event has become a popular, regular attraction in the Lincolnshire summer events calendar.

With a packed schedule of entertainment throughout the weekend, including live music, singing and dancing, living history reenactor groups from around the country with vintage military and civilian vehicles.

https://thorpecamp.wixsite.com/1940sweekend
