= RAF Woodhall Spa =

Former Royal Air Force station in Lincolnshire, England

RAF Woodhall Spa
- Tattershall Thorpe, Lincolnshire in England
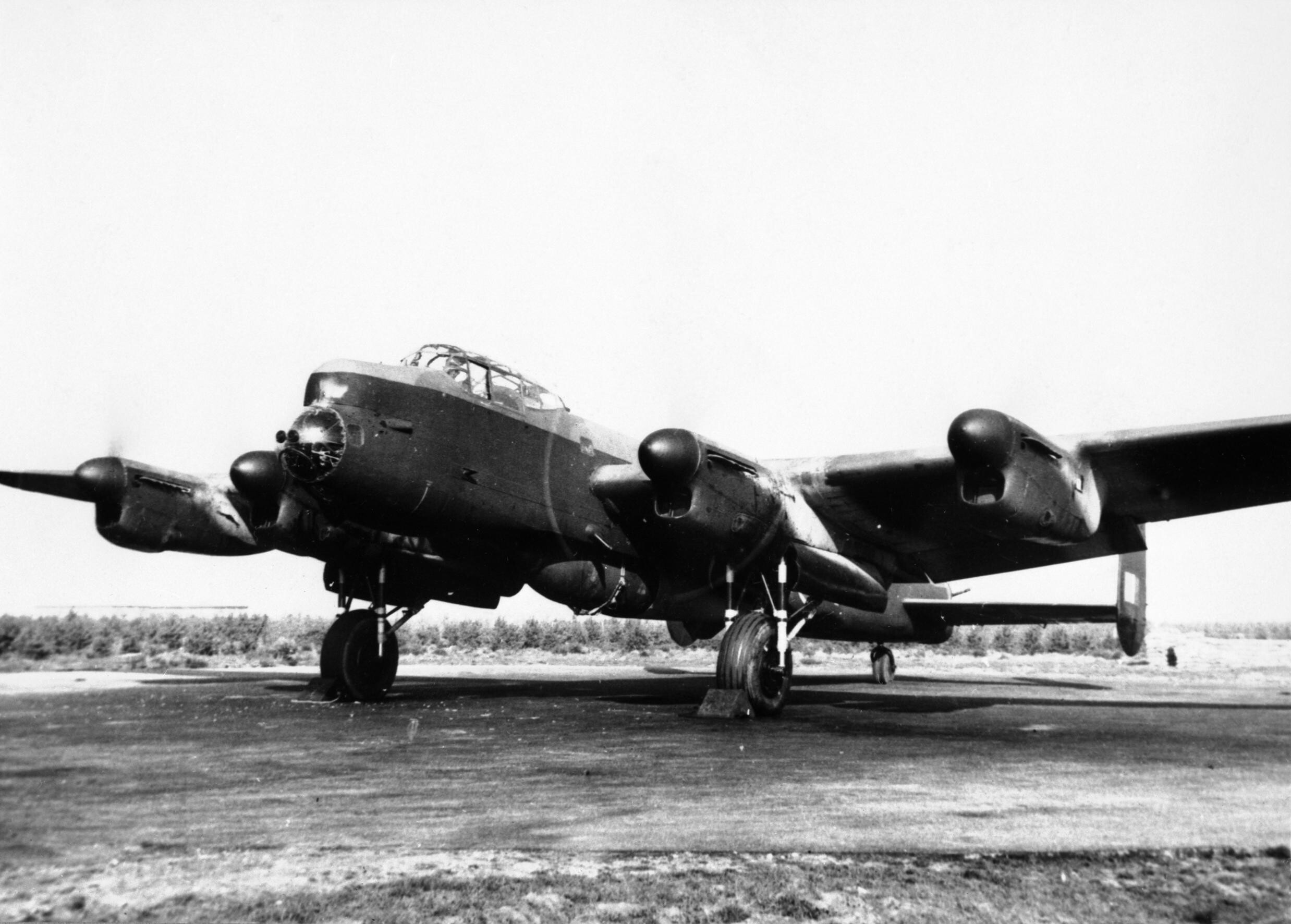
- Avro Lancaster of 617 Squadron at Woodhall Spa

Site information
- Type: Satellite station
- Code: WS
- Owner: Ministry of Defence
- Operator: Royal Air Force
- Controlled by: RAF Bomber Command * No. 5 Group RAF

Location
- Shown within Lincolnshire RAF Woodhall Spa (the United Kingdom)
- Coordinates: 53°07′54″N 0°11′04″W

Site history
- Built: 1941/42
- In use: February 1942 - 1967
- Battles/wars: European theatre of World War II; Cold War

Airfield information
- Elevation: 10 metres (33 ft) AMSL
Runways
Direction	Length and surface
00/00	Concrete
00/00	Concrete
00/00	Concrete

Royal Air Force Woodhall Spa, or more simply RAF Woodhall Spa, is a former Royal Air Force satellite station located 2 miles (3.2 km) north of Coningsby, Lincolnshire and 16 miles (26 km) southeast of Lincoln, Lincolnshire, England.

== History ==
Constructed on farmland 1.2 miles (1.9 km) south of Woodhall Spa, the station opened in February 1942 as a satellite station to RAF Coningsby. In August 1943 it became No. 54 Base Substation. After victory in Europe (May 1945) the airfield was used as an assembly and kitting out point for Tiger Force (a proposed heavy bomber force for the far east). After the end of the Second World War and with the move of No. 617 Squadron RAF to RAF Waddington the airfield was closed and the site used by No. 92 Maintenance Unit for the storage of bombs.

From the late 1950s it was used as a base for Bristol Bloodhound Missiles until 1964 when most of the site was sold off for agriculture or mineral extraction. The former missile site used to be under the control of RAF Coningsby having been used for the servicing of McDonnell Douglas Phantom and Panavia Tornado aircraft engines until finally being mothballed in 2003.

=== Squadrons ===
97 Squadron transferred to Woodhall Spa on 1 March 1942. As one of the earliest squadrons to be equipped with the Avro Lancaster they were heavily involved with the early operations with this aircraft, including the low level mission to bomb the MAN diesel engine factory in Augsburg on 17 April 1942. New Zealander Les Munro (the last surviving pilot who flew on 617 Squadron's Dambuster raid), served with 97 Squadron at Woodhall Spa before being posted to Scampton to join 617 in early 1943. He came back to Woodhall Spa in January 1944 when 617 moved there for the rest of the war. 97 Squadron moved to RAF Bourn in 1943 leaving behind 3 crews.

619 Squadron were formed here on 18 April 1943. They moved to RAF Coningsby on 1 January 1944.

617 Squadron who arrived with 34 Avro Lancasters and 2 de Havilland Mosquitoes, the latter being used for low level target marking. 617 Squadron remained here until the end of hostilities and pioneered the use of the Tallboy and Grand Slam bombs from the airfield.

627 Squadron The low level target marking that had been developed by 617 Squadron was so successful that 627 Squadron, a Mosquito unit in No. 8 (PFF) Group, was "loaned" to 5 Group to operate in this role. The squadron arrived at Woodhall Spa on 14 April 1944 and stayed until the end of the war.

=== Interesting facts ===
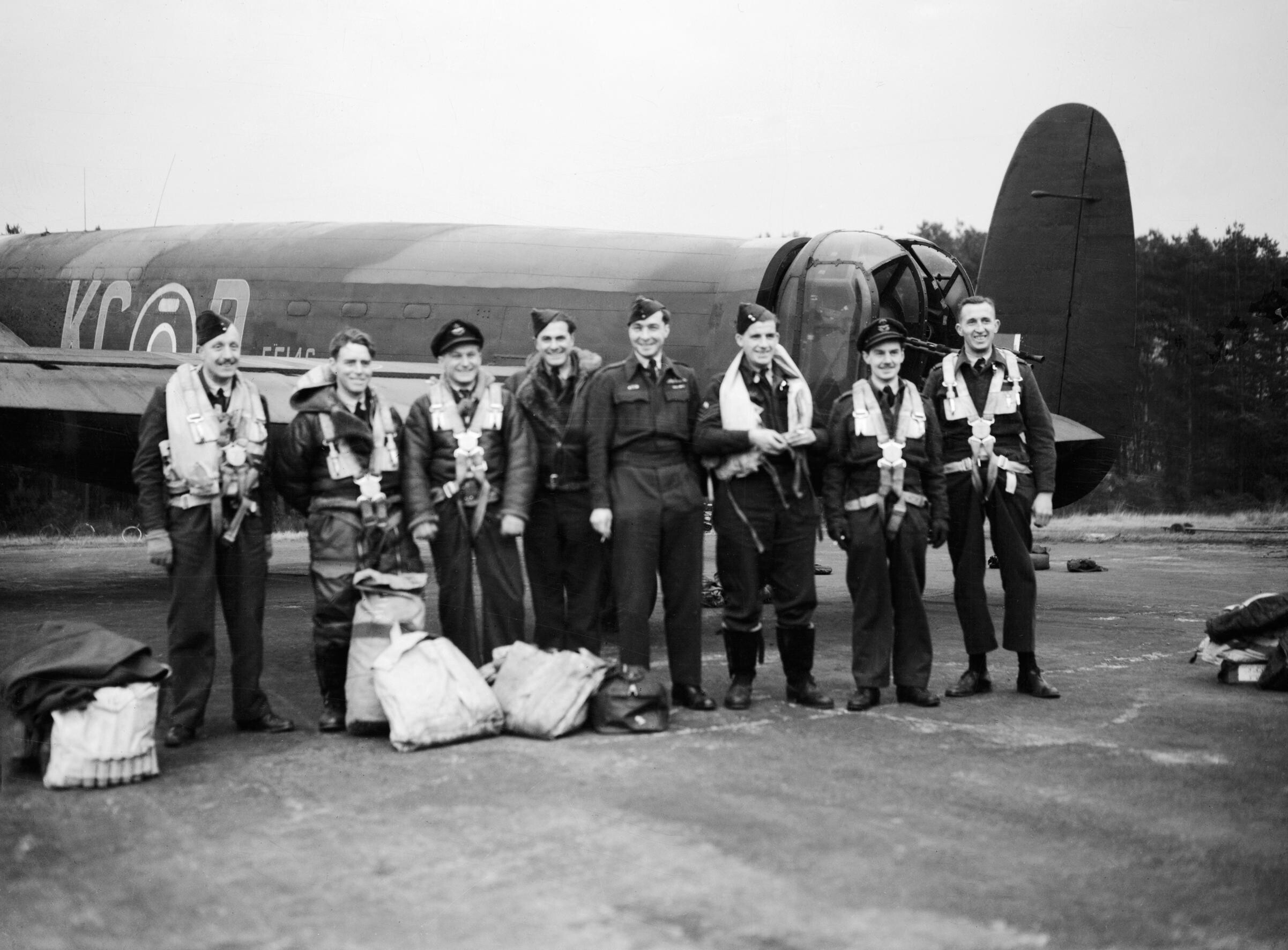
Wing Commander Tait, (fifth from left), standing with his crew by the tail of their Lancaster at Woodhall Spa, on returning from Lossiemouth, the day after the successful raid on the German battleship Tirpitz

Aircraft from this RAF station:

- dropped the first operational 12,000 lb Tallboy bombs and blocked the Saumur railway tunnel in France, a key point through which passed the direct rail lines from the south of France to Normandy, and the active front.
- attacked coastal targets, such as the U-boat bases at La Pallice and Lorient, also destroying the E-boat pens at Le Havre.
- a raid on Brest saw the sinking of the cruiser Gueydon. Other attacks directed on Swinemünde culminated in the sinking of the heavy German cruiser Lützow (albeit in shallow water) with a single Tallboy bomb.
- The Tirpitz was sunk in Tromsø fjord on 12 November by aircraft from Woodhall Spa and Bardney as part of Operation Catechism.
- The last raid from Woodhall was an attack on Hitler's Berghof near Berchtesgaden.

=== Petwood Hotel ===
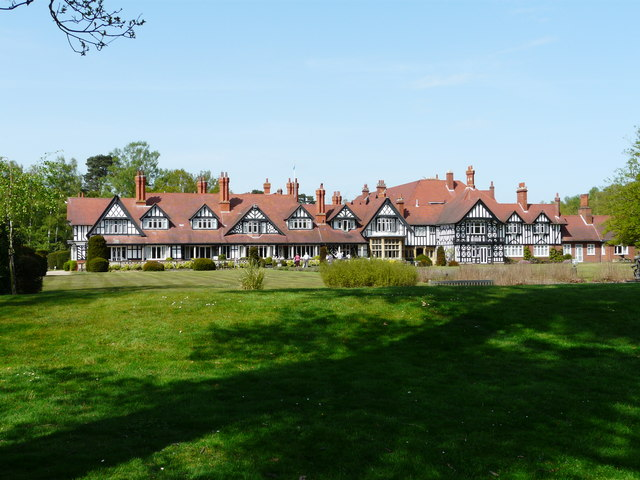
Petwood was used as the Officers' Mess for the station throughout the war

Sir Archibald Weigall, 1st Baronet and his wife Grace Emily built a country house called Petwood at Woodhall Spa. Petwood was so called because Lady Weigall had it constructed of her favourite wood, her "pet wood". Petwood was designed by the architect Frank Peck. Lady Weigall turned her former home into a hotel in 1933 when the Weigalls moved to Ascot.

Requisitioned at the start of the war the Petwood Hotel became the Officers' mess for the station, from the days of 97 Squadron through to the end of the war. The house with its panelled rooms and extensive grounds provided a comfortable haven for the officers who were billeted there. The mess hosted a number of parties, including the initial anniversary celebration of the Dam Buster raids. After the war Petwood reverted to its former use as a hotel, but preserved the small squadron bar as it was in wartime.

=== Postwar Operations ===
In 1960 RAF Woodhall Spa became a base for the Bristol Bloodhound, Surface-to-air missiles operated by 222 Squadron.

112 Squadron took over this role in late 1964 concurrent with an on-site upgrade to Bloodhound Mk2. The squadron moved to Episkopi, Cyprus on 1 October 1967, moving to Paramali on 20 June 1969 and remained there until it was disbanded on 1 July 1975.

1967 saw the end of front line operations at RAF Woodhall Spa, although the RAF continued to occupy a small site on the northwestern edge of the airfield between 1968 - 1992 to be used for engine maintenance and testing; first for the Spey 202 for the Phantom.

This undertook deep stripping of the engine, the first time Rolls-Royce had allowed this type of work to be carried out by the RAF, and the testing of the rebuilt engines before fitting to the aircraft. Engine testing was initially carried out at Coningsby but later moved to Woodhall around 1981 as the original Uninstalled Engine Test Facility (UETF) was to be used for the construction of Hardened Aircraft Shelters (HAS). The site was known as RAF Woodhall and operated as a satellite unit of nearby RAF Coningsby.

== 21st century ==
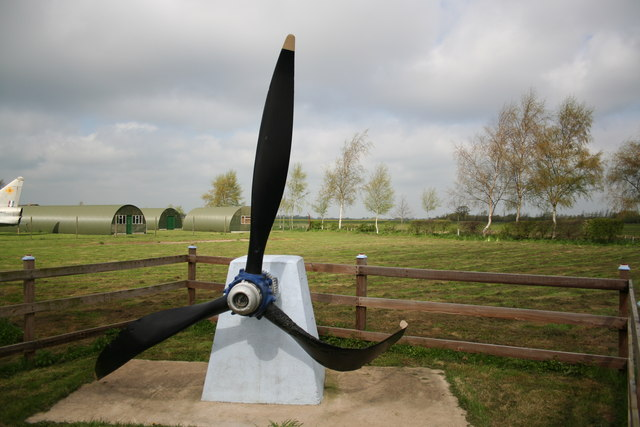
Thorpe Camp - display of Lancaster propeller

Whilst little evidence remains of the extent of the activities at RAF Woodhall Spa, part of one of the accommodation blocks is now occupied by the Thorpe Camp Visitor Centre and commemorates the sacrifice made by those who fought in the Second World War and has an array of exhibits that portray both RAF Woodhall Spa and many aspects of life both within the forces and civilian life during that period.

Much of the site had been used as a gravel quarry until it was purchased by the Lincolnshire Wildlife Trust in 2015 to secure the heritage and create a new nature reserve. The new wildlife reserve is continuous with the Trust's existing reserve at Kirkby Moor. The landscape of the nature reserve is one of sandy soils with acid grassland, heathland, open water and some small areas of marsh.

In October 2017, two people were injured by mustard gas found in canisters buried in Roughton Moor Wood, which was once part of the temporary Army camp adjacent to RAF Woodhall. This resulted in three wartime memorabilia collectors convicted in mid-2020, with one of those persons gaoled for five years include for breaching environmental laws by dumping hazardous material.
