= New Malden High Street =

Street in London, England

Coordinates: 51°24′1.7″N 0°15′20.7″W

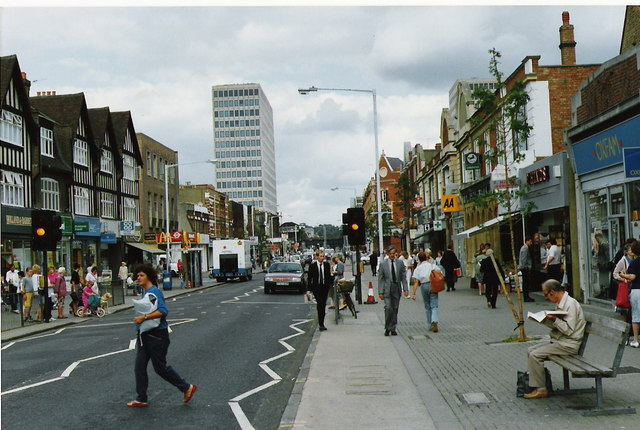
New Malden High Street, 1993

New Malden High Street is a 1 km-long high street in New Malden, the centre of the suburb that grew up around New Malden railway station in the 19th and 20th centuries. It is in the Royal Borough of Kingston upon Thames, now part of south west London.

== Features ==
As well as containing a variety of high street names, New Malden High Street is most notable for its many Korean shops and restaurants, due to New Malden having the largest population of South Koreans in Europe. Mace, a high-end, small department store specialising in authentic English goods such as china and glass, is a frequent tourist destination for Korean businesspeople, especially when the exchange rate is favourable. There are several other ethnic restaurants and shops in the High Street and nearby.

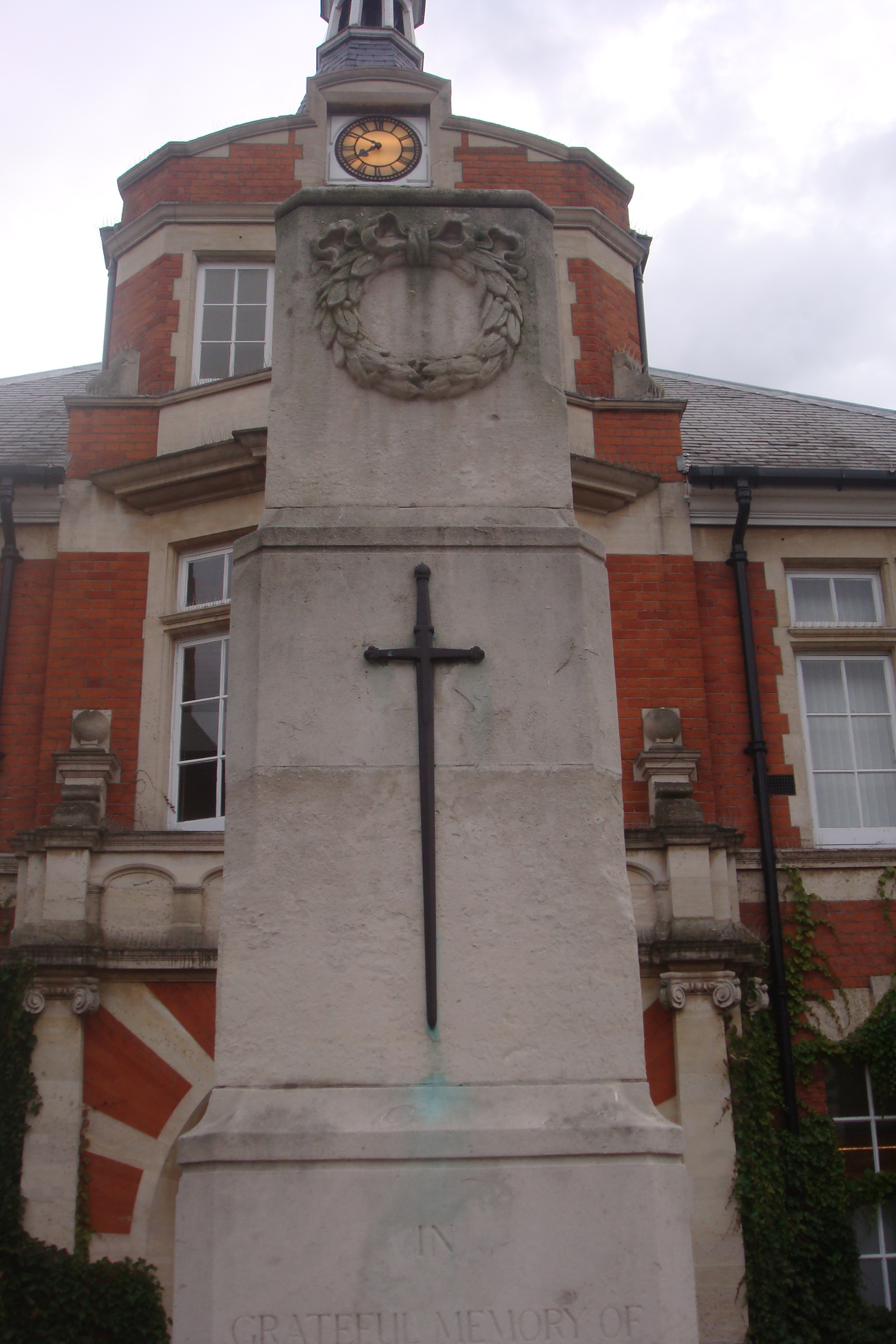
New Malden War Memorial

Tudor Williams Ltd, established in 1913, was a family-run department store in the High Street. It went into administration and closed in June 2019.

Waitrose opened their 131st branch in New Malden High Street, behind New Malden War Memorial.

Each Christmas, the High Street is festooned with Christmas lights with its own switching-on ceremony. Choirs from primary schools around New Malden sing Christmas Carols to the townsfolk.

Each summer, Malden Fortnight includes a Saturday afternoon "Grand Parade" along the High Street and an all-day Saturday "Craft Fair" along the sides of the High Street.

On 7 June 2020, New Malden High Street was the site of a peaceful static protest in support of the Black Lives Matter movement. Several hundred local residents lined the road for more than an hour to voice their support for anti-racism. At 1pm they kneeled for 8 minutes 46 seconds in memory of George Floyd.

== Fountain ==
At the southern end of the High Street there is a roundabout known as the Fountain Roundabout because it has a fountain which was originally used for drinking water by horses. The Fountain Roundabout has The Fountain Public House on one corner (closed in 2018) and The Watchman Public House (formerly a police station) on another. From the roundabout are four exits: one to the High Street, one to Kingston upon Thames, one towards Worcester Park, Cheam and Sutton, and one towards Raynes Park and Wimbledon; the latter two cross the main London to Portsmouth Road (A3 road).

== Railway bridges ==
The northern end of the High Street is under the centre of the twin railway bridges by New Malden railway station. The station entrance is on Coombe Road, which extends the High Street shopping area.
