= Charles Clarke (RAF officer) =

British Royal Air Force officer (1923–2019)

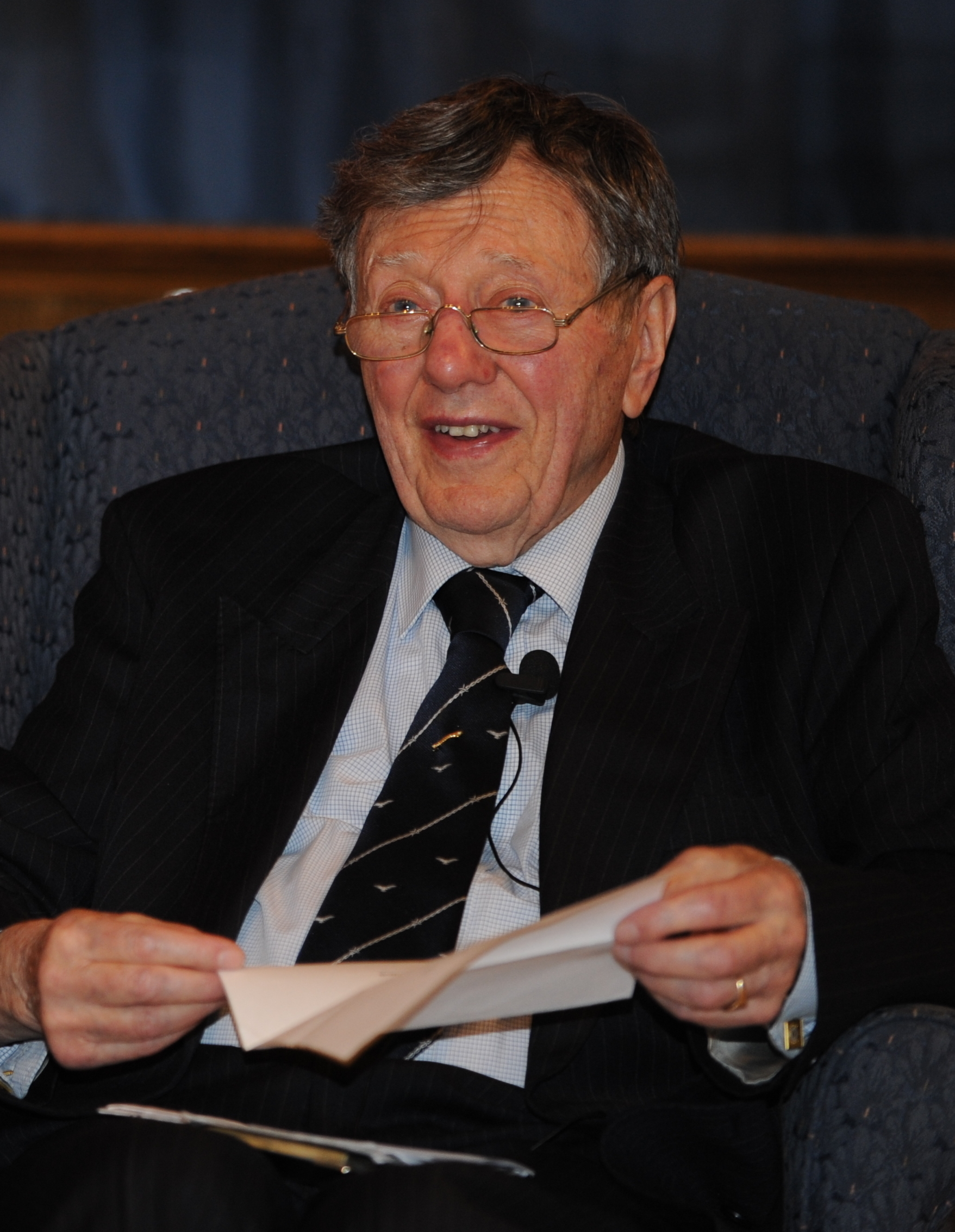
- Air Cdre (retd) Charles Clarke in 2013
- Born: Charles Henry Clarke; 25 November 1923; Tottenham, London, England
- Died: 7 May 2019 (aged 95)
- Military career
- Allegiance: United Kingdom
- Service: Royal Air Force
- Service years: 1941–1978
- Rank: Air Commodore
- Service number: 138404 (officer)
- Unit: No. 619 Squadron RAF
- Conflicts: Second World War; Aden Emergency

Air Commodore Charles Henry Clarke, OBE (25 November 1923 – 7 May 2019) was a British Royal Air Force officer. Having served in Bomber Command in the Second World War, he was shot down and interned at Stalag Luft III—this was The Great Escape camp and he acted as a watcher but was not involved in the escape itself. He remained in the RAF after the war, commanded RAF Stafford, served in Palestine, Aden and Malta, before retiring in 1978. He later campaigned for a memorial to Bomber Command: one was finally erected in 2012 in London.

== Early life and education ==
Clarke was born on 25 November 1923 in the Old Street area of Tottenham, London, England. He was the eldest of three children of Thomas Clarke, who had fought in the Machine Gun Corps in the First World War, and Elizabeth. He was educated at Down Lane Central School in Tottenham. He left school at the age of 17.

== RAF career ==
=== Second World War ===
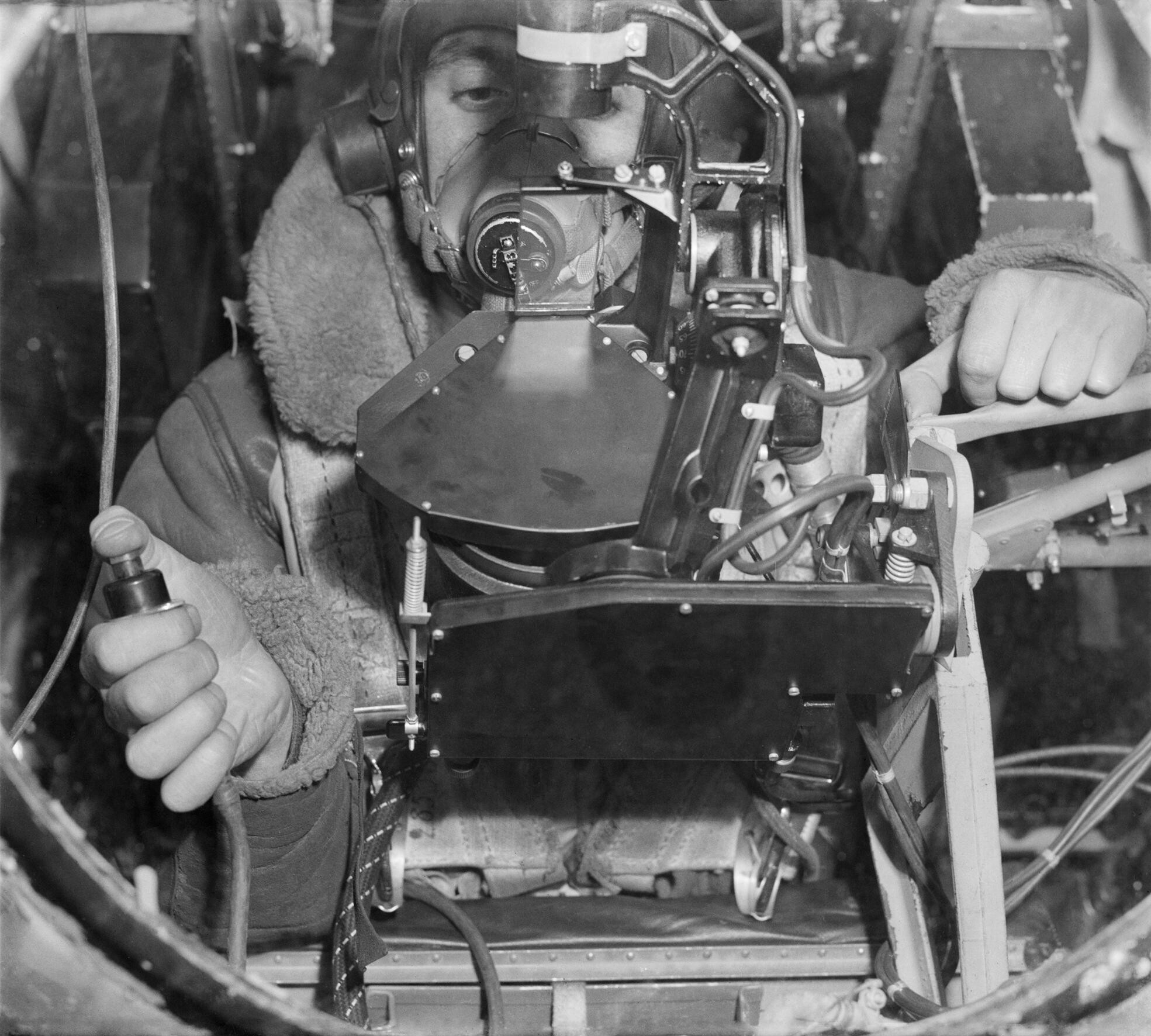
Bomb-aimer on board an Avro Lancaster

In 1941, Clarke joined the Royal Air Force. Serving in the other ranks, he rose to leading aircraftman. On 1 March 1943, he was commissioned into the Royal Air Force Volunteer Reserve as a pilot officer on probation (emergency commission). He was posted to No. 619 Squadron, where he served as a bomb aimer on the squadron's Lancasters. He completed 18 missions before being shot down on his 19th.

On 25 February 1944, while on a bombing mission to Germany, Clarke was shot down over the Black Forest. He and three others parachuted from the plane; the three other crew members died in the crash. He was captured by the Germans, and eventually taken to Stalag Luft III: he arrived at the prisoner of war camp weeks before The Great Escape of 24/25 March 1944. He acted as a watcher to those digging the tunnels (warning them of any nearing guards) and as a forger (creating papers for the escapees). He did not take part in the escape, and he remained in the camp until a forced march in January 1945 (the "Long March") took him and the remaining prisoners to a new camp near Lübeck. He was promoted to a war substantive flight lieutenant on 1 March 1945. He was liberated by British forces in April 1945. In later life, he helped build a replica of Hut 104 (the start of The Great Escape tunnel) at Stalag Luft III, and would return each anniversary to Poland to retrace the steps he took on the "Long March".

=== Post-war service ===
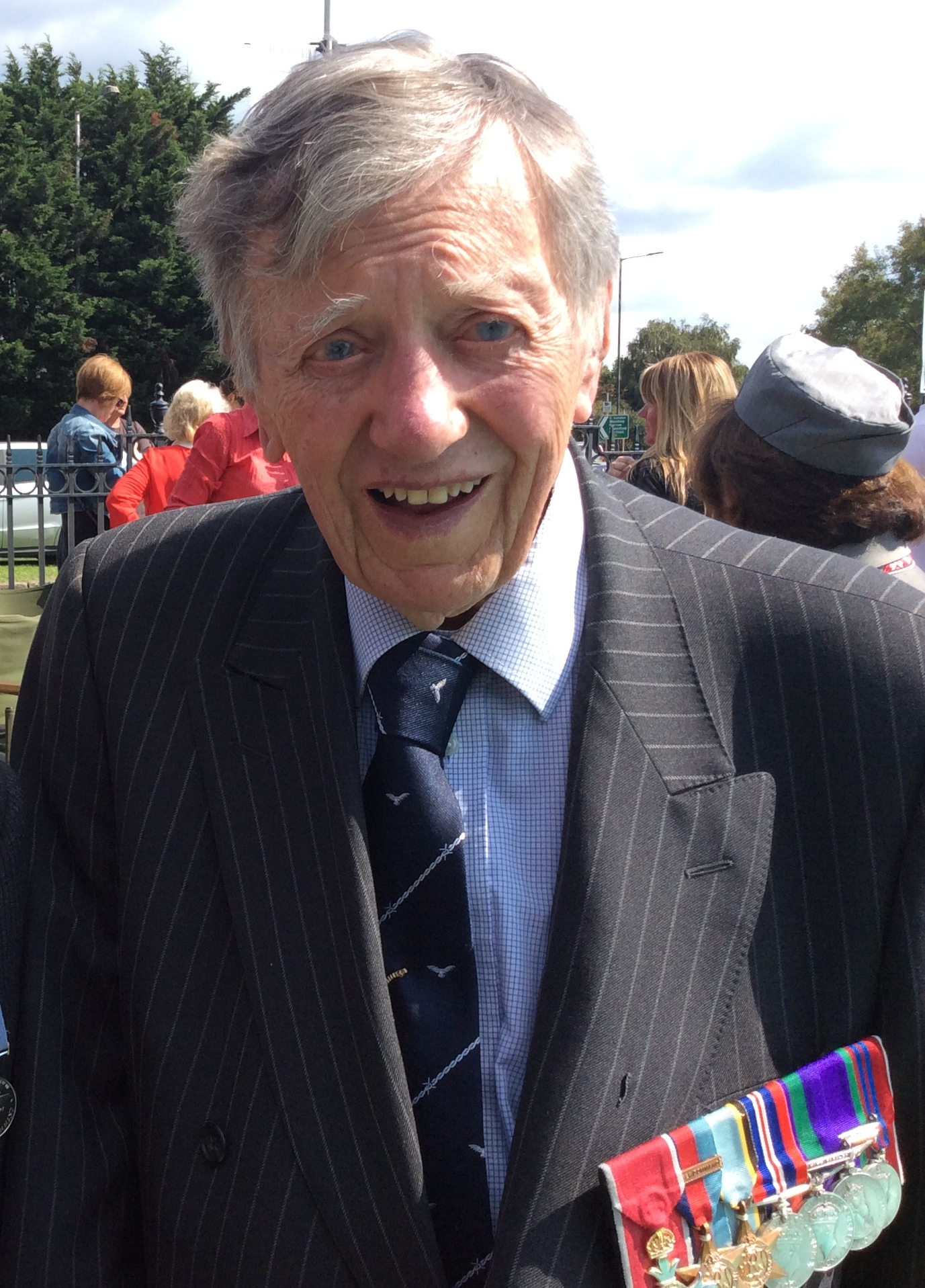
Clarke with medals in 2017

On 1 January 1947, Clarke transferred to the equipment branch as a flying officer with seniority on that rank from 1 March 1945. He was promoted to flight lieutenant on 25 February 1948. He was granted a permanent commission on 1 April 1952, thereby allowing him to serve in the RAF until retirement. As part of the half-yearly promotions, he was promoted to squadron leader on 1 January 1953, to wing commander on 1 July 1961, and to group captain on 1 January 1967.

In addition to his Second World War service, he undertook a number of overseas postings. He served in Palestine during the 1947–1949 Palestine war, in Aden during the Aden Emergency and the British withdrawal in 1967, and in Malta. From 1967 to 1970, he was officer commanding RAF Stafford. He also had desk jobs at the Ministry of Aircraft Production, the Air Ministry, and at the Ministry of Defence.

Clarke retired from the Royal Air Force in November 1978, with the rank of air commodore.

== Later life ==
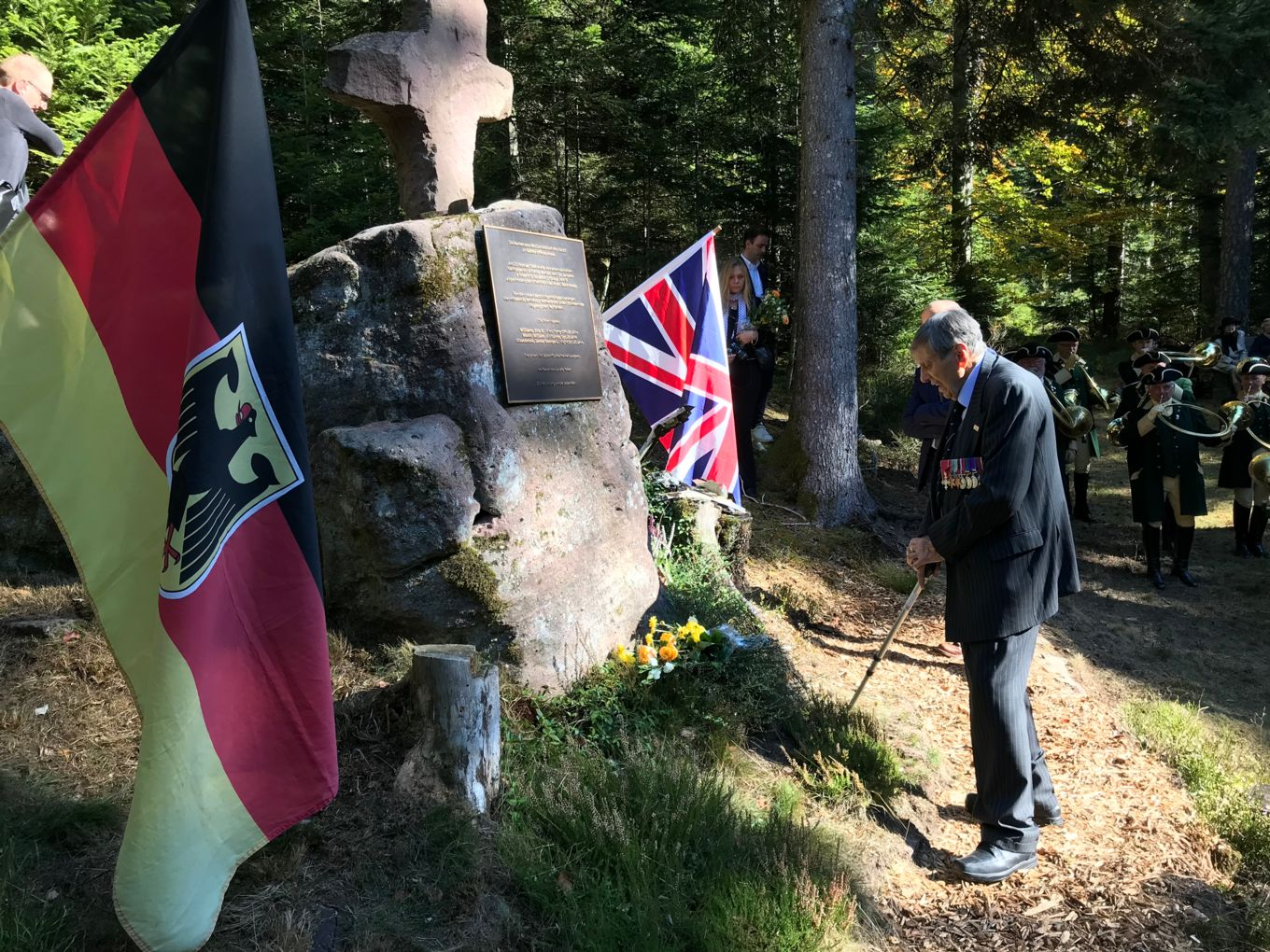
Clarke at the memorial of his plane crash in the Black Forest, Germany in 2018

After retiring from the RAF, Clarke moved into business, including working as a director of the department store Debenhams. He maintained his links with the RAF through serving as President and Chair of the Royal Air Forces Ex-POW Association and as Chair of the Bomber Command Association. He was a leading figure in the campaign for a memorial to Bomber Command: one was eventually erected in 2012 in London's Green Park.

In the 2007 New Year Honours, he was appointed Officer of the Order of the British Empire (OBE) "For services to the Royal Air Forces Ex-Prisoners of War Association".

== Personal life ==
Clarke met his wife, Eileen (née Fosh), at a war-time dance. They married in November 1946, following his return from the war. Together they had a daughter, Naida: she is a former merchant banker who married Sir Gordon Duff.

Clarke died on 7 May 2019, aged 95.
