= Kingston Rural District =

Local government area in Surrey, England (1894–5)

Coordinates: 51.381°N 0.331°W

Kingston was a short-lived rural district in Surrey, England from 1894 to 1895.

The district was formed by the Local Government Act 1894 as the successor to Kingston Rural Sanitary District.

The district comprised the following civil parishes:

- Coombe
- Esher
- Hook
- Long Ditton
- Malden
- Thames Ditton
- West Molesey

The rural district was abolished in 1895 when all the parishes were included in urban districts:

- Coombe and Malden were combined with New Malden Urban District to become The Maldens and Coombe Urban District
- Esher, Thames Ditton and most of Long Ditton became Esher and the Dittons Urban District
- Hook (and Tolworth to its east being a detached part of Long Ditton) were added to Surbiton Urban District
- West Molesey was added to East Molesey Urban District to create East and West Molesey Urban District
