= Tattershall Thorpe =

Hamlet and civil parish in the East Lindsey district of Lincolnshire, England

Coordinates: 53.118610°N 0.179609°W

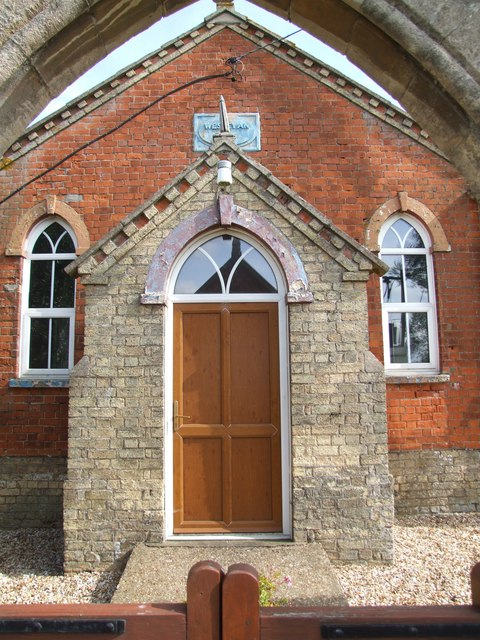
- Wesleyan Chapel, Tattershall Thorpe

- Location within Lincolnshire
- Population: 245 (2011)
- OS grid reference: TF219594
  - London: 110 mi (180 km) S
- District: East Lindsey
- Shire county: Lincolnshire
- Region: East Midlands
- Country: England
- Sovereign state: United Kingdom
- Post town: Lincoln
- Postcode district: LN4
- Police: Lincolnshire
- Fire: Lincolnshire
- Ambulance: East Midlands
- UK Parliament: Louth and Horncastle

Tattershall Thorpe is a hamlet and civil parish in the East Lindsey district of Lincolnshire, England. It is situated approximately 3 miles (5 km) south from Woodhall Spa, and 1 mile (1.6 km) north-east from Tattershall.

The hamlet is significant because of its Second World War connection with RAF Woodhall Spa, which was in this parish.

== RAF Woodhall Spa ==
RAF Woodhall Spa was planned as a satellite airfield to RAF Coningsby. Construction began in 1940, but because of the threat of invasion further construction was postponed until 1942 and the airfield opened later that year. It consisted of three concrete runways and was equipped with aircraft hangars, and temporary accommodation for over 1000 men. As it was intended to be a heavy bomber base for Royal Air Force Bomber Command, there were also large bomb stores, situated to the north of the flying field, The airfield was mainly used by 97 Squadron and then 617 Squadron (famous as the Dambusters). In the latter part of the war 617 Squadron was involved in dropping powerful "Grand Slam" bombs. After the war flying ceased but the site was reactivated as a Bristol Bloodhound Missile site between 1960 and 1967. In 2000 part of the site remained in use by the RAF for testing aircraft engines.

== Thorpe Camp ==
Thorpe Camp was part of Number 1 Communal Site, RAF Woodhall Spa, and was built in 1940. After the war, it was taken over by Horncastle Rural District Council which used it for temporary housing until the 1960s. By the late 1980s it was derelict, and likely to be knocked down, until the Thorpe Camp Preservation Group, a registered charity, first leased and then bought the site. They opened the Thorpe Camp Visitor Centre with museum exhibits in the remaining buildings.

== The Bluebell Inn ==
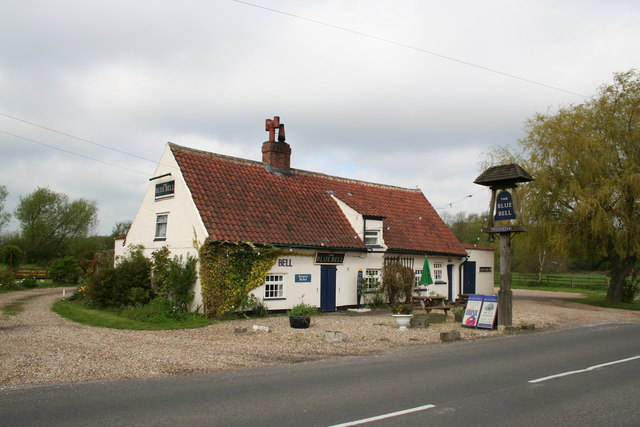
The Bluebell Inn

The Bluebell Inn is a public house dating from approximately 1257 AD. It became an Inn during the 17th century, with 19th- and 20th-century alterations. It is constructed of "mud and stud" and partly underbuilt with painted brick. It is a Grade II listed building, and houses RAF memorabilia from RAF Woodhall Spa, an active RAF Station during the Second World War. The Bluebell Inn has signatures on its ceiling from some of the members of 97, 619, 617 (Dambusters) and 627 Squadrons who frequented the pub. RAF personnel from the Battle of Britain Memorial Flight and Squadrons from RAF Coningsby sign to this day to continue the tradition. Wing Commander Guy Gibson, leader of the 1943 "Dam Busters" raid, visited on several occasions until his death in September 1944.

== Anglo-Saxon smith’s burial ==
In 1981, an isolated Anglo-Saxon period burial was excavated at Tattershall Thorpe. It is aligned approximately east–west and has been dated to the seventh century. It contained an assemblage comprising an anvil and other items of smith's equipment, as well as bells that may have been used to signal the presence of a stranger. The burial has been cited in support of the proposition that smiths were treated as socially peripheral in their time.

== Demographics ==
Population of Tattershall Thorpe Civil Parish, 1891- 2001
Year	1891	1901	1911	1921	1931	1951	1961	2001	2011
Population	277	233	222	213	196	482	178	264	245
