= Sessions House, Surbiton =

Municipal building in London, England

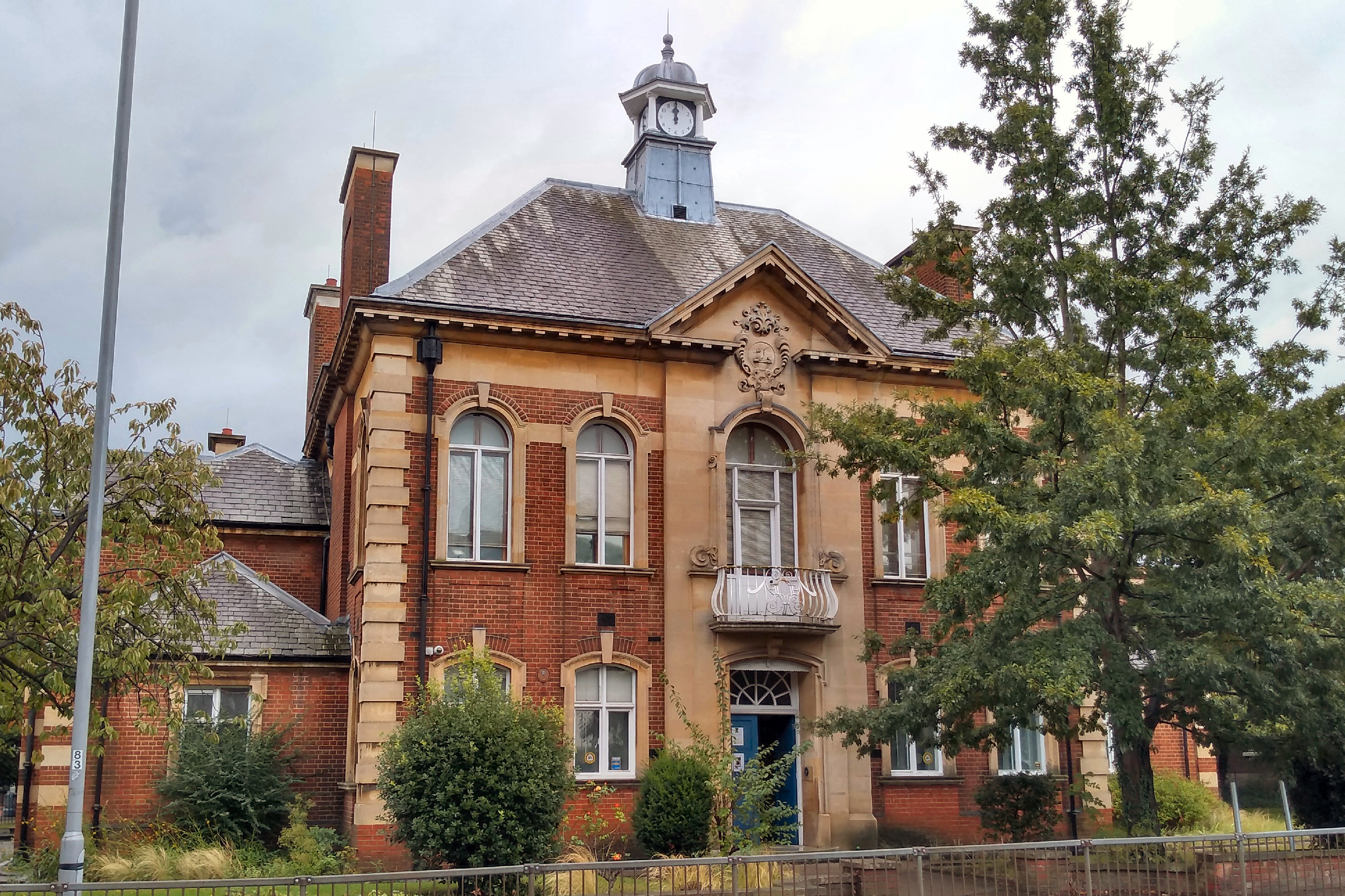
- Sessions House, Surbiton

- Shown in Kingston upon Thames
- 51.3930°N 0.2982°W
- Location: Ewell Road, Surbiton

History
- Built: 1898

Site notes
- Architectural style: Edwardian Baroque style

Listed Building – Grade II
- Designated: 6 October 1983
- Reference no.: 1358440

The Sessions House is a municipal building in Ewell Road, Surbiton, London. It is a Grade II listed building.

== History ==
In the late 19th century Surbiton local board met in various places including private residences and public houses but, after the area became an urban district in 1894, civic leaders decided that this arrangement was inadequate and chose to procure purpose-built civic offices; the site selected had been occupied by a private residence known as "Hill House". (Note: After the Castellated Palace at Kew was demolished on the orders of George IV in the early 1820s some of the stone was recovered and used for the construction of Hill House which was completed in 1826. The last owner of Hill House was Sir Charles Pressly (1794-1880), Chairman of the Inland Revenue.)

The building, which was designed in the Edwardian Baroque style, was completed in 1898. The design involved a symmetrical main frontage with five bays facing onto Ewell Road; the central section featured an arched doorway with a fanlight on the ground floor; there was a wrought iron balcony and a round-headed window with the borough coat of arms and a pediment above on the first floor; there was a cupola containing a clock at roof level.

The building became the headquarters of Municipal Borough of Surbiton when it secured municipal borough status in 1936 but ceased to be the local seat of government after the creation of the Royal Borough of Kingston upon Thames in 1965. Instead, the building was converted for judicial use as a venue for holding the quarter sessions: it then became known as the "Sessions House". Following the implementation of the Courts Act 1971, the former assizes courthouse was re-designated Surbiton Crown Court.

Crown Court sittings at the Sessions House ceased in 1997 when a new Crown Court opened at The Bittoms in Kingston upon Thames. However the courthouse continued to operate as an immigration appeal court. After the building fell vacant in 2009, it was converted for use as a learning disability centre managed by a social enterprise concern known as "Your Health Care" which started to provide some services at the centre on behalf of Kingston Hospital NHS Foundation Trust. There were concerns in the local community in May 2012 when the Deputy leader of Kingston Council, Liz Green, refused to deny that the council wanted to dispose of the Sessions House along with the adjacent library. The roof was subsequently changed and the building was then used as an Asylum and Immigration Tribunal office.

== Sources ==
- Richardson, Rowley (1888). "Surbiton; thirty-two years of local self-government, 1855-1887". Bull and Son. p. 8.
