= New Malden War Memorial =

War memorial in England

- United Kingdom
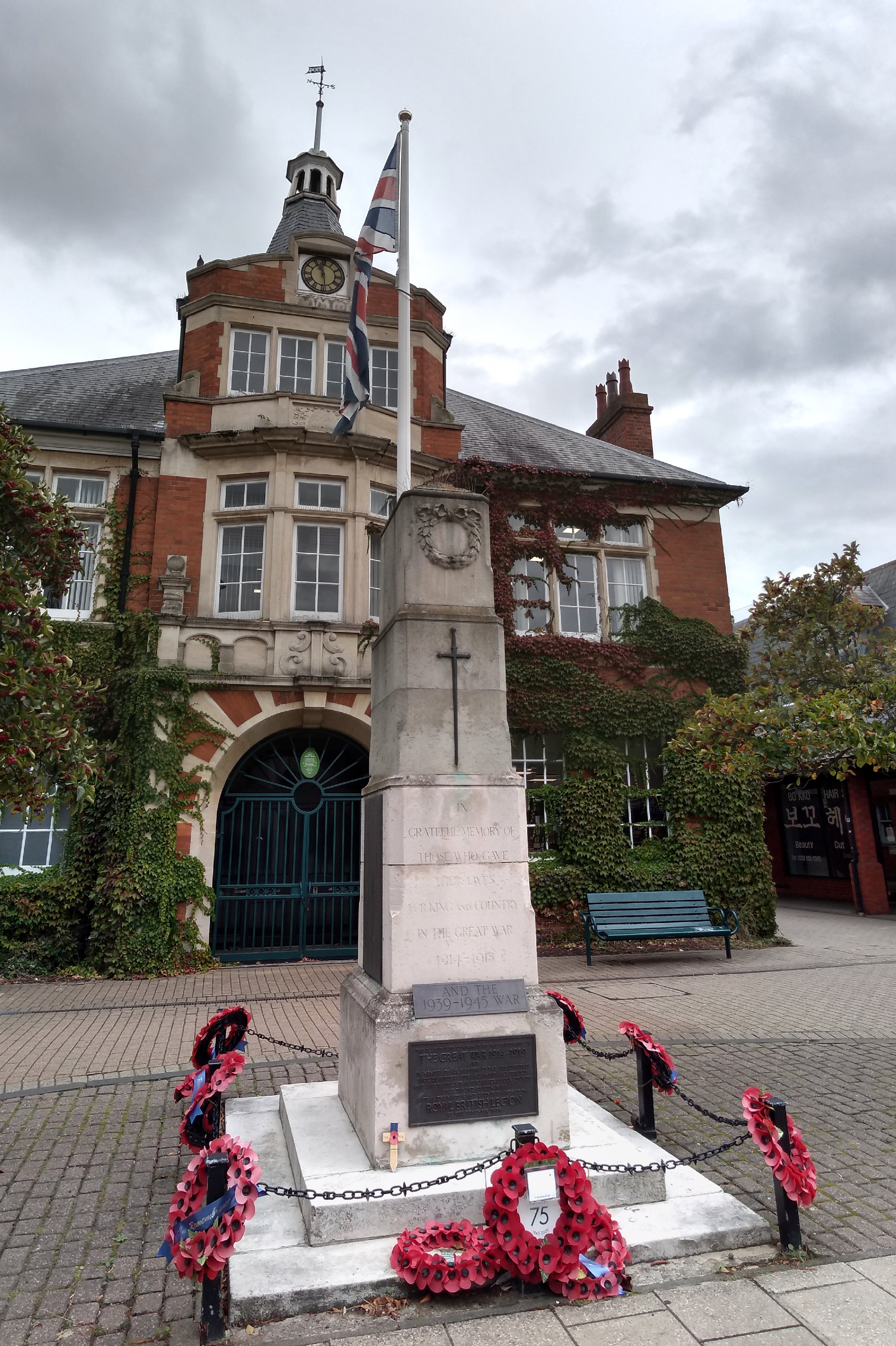
- For New Malden residents who died in the First and Second World Wars
- Unveiled: 8 November 1924
- Location: 51.402468°N 0.256288°W; New Malden, Royal Borough of Kingston upon Thames, London
- GRATEFUL MEMORY OF THOSE WHO GAVE THEIR LIVES FOR KING AND COUNTRY IN THE GREAT WAR 1914 – 1918. AND THE 1939 – 1945 WAR.

Listed Building – Grade II
- Official name: New Malden War Memorial
- Designated: 15 March 2017
- Reference no.: 1444427

New Malden War Memorial is a Grade II listed war memorial in the town of New Malden, Royal Borough of Kingston upon Thames, Greater London, England, commemorating local victims of the First and Second World Wars. Situated in the High Street of New Malden, in front of the erstwhile New Malden Town Hall now owned by Waitrose, New Malden War Memorial comprises a three-tiered cenotaph on a pedestal and two-stepped base.

The memorial was unveiled in a public ceremony on 8 November 1924 by Private F. Jackson of the Royal Welsh Fusiliers, who was blinded during the First World War. It was slightly damaged on 16 October 1940 after a bomb fell within 20 feet (6.1 m) of the memorial during the Blitz. The memorial was rededicated in 1952 to honour New Malden soldiers who died during the Second World War, with more names added on 3 May 1998 in a ceremony hosted by Councillor Chrissie Hitchcock. On 27 July 2014, a new plaque was added to commemorate the centenary of the First World War. It was listed at Grade II by Historic England on 15 March 2017.

== See also ==
- List of public art in the Royal Borough of Kingston upon Thames
