= Nick Knilans =

American bomber pilot (1917–2012)

- Born: 27 December 1917; Delavan, Wisconsin, us
- Died: 1 June 2012 (aged 94); King, Waupaca County, Wisconsin, us
- Military career
- Allegiance: United States; Canada
- Branch: United States Army; Royal Canadian Air Force; United States Army Air Forces
- Rank: Major
- Units: No. 619 Squadron RAF (1943–44); No. 617 Squadron RAF (1944)
- Conflicts: Second World War: Battle of Hamburg; Battle of Berlin; Operation Taxable; Operation Paravane
- Awards: Distinguished Flying Cross; Air Medal (6); Distinguished Service Order (United Kingdom); Distinguished Flying Cross (United Kingdom)

Hubert Clarence "Nick" Knilans, DSO, DFC (27 December 1917 – 1 June 2012) was an American bomber pilot who served with the Royal Canadian Air Force (RCAF) and Royal Air Force (RAF) during the Second World War.

== Military career ==
Born in Delavan, Wisconsin, Knilans was conscripted by the United States Army in April 1941 but, wanting to fly, he absconded to Canada and joined the Royal Canadian Air Force (RCAF). He sailed across the Atlantic aboard the Queen Elizabeth and joined No. 619 Squadron RAF in June 1943.

While Knilans served with 619 Squadron, he was officially transferred to the United States Army Air Forces (USAAF), at the rank of first lieutenant – equivalent to an RAF flying officer. (Though due to the significantly higher rates paid in the US forces, he received pay equivalent to an RAF group captain.) Knilands was officially seconded to the RAF; he and his crew flew operations with 619 until January 1944, when they volunteered to join No. 617 Squadron RAF ("The Dambusters"). With 617 they took part in various raids, including Operation Taxable, Operation Paravane, and the attacks on the German battleship Tirpitz.

Knilans was awarded the Distinguished Service Order on 17 January 1944, the Commonwealth Distinguished Flying Cross, the United States Distinguished Flying Cross and six Air Medals.

== Later life ==
After the war, Knilans was a teacher for 25 years and worked as a Peace Corps volunteer in Nigeria for two years. He never married.
