= St Paul's, Kingston =

Church in Kingston, London

Coordinates: 51.4178°N 0.2857°W

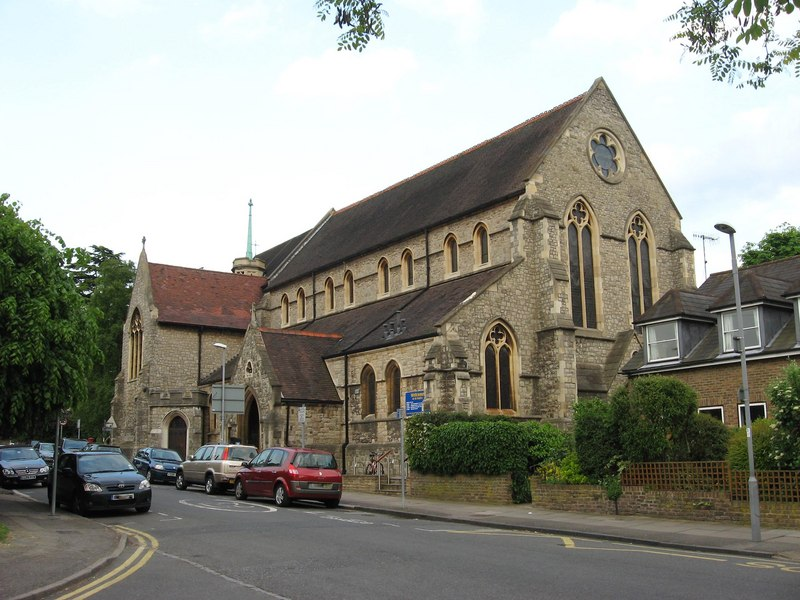
St Paul's, Kingston

St Paul's is a Church of England parish church of the Kingston Hill parish within the Diocese of Southwark in London. The church was constructed in 1878 and its parish established in 1881.

The building is Grade II listed. The original structure was designed by Frank Peck in a Gothic style and finished in 1878 but there are later additions such as the chancel added in 1912 and later the transepts designed by Percy Lamb which were finished by 1928.
