= New Malden Town Hall =

Municipal building in London, England

New Malden Town Hall Facade
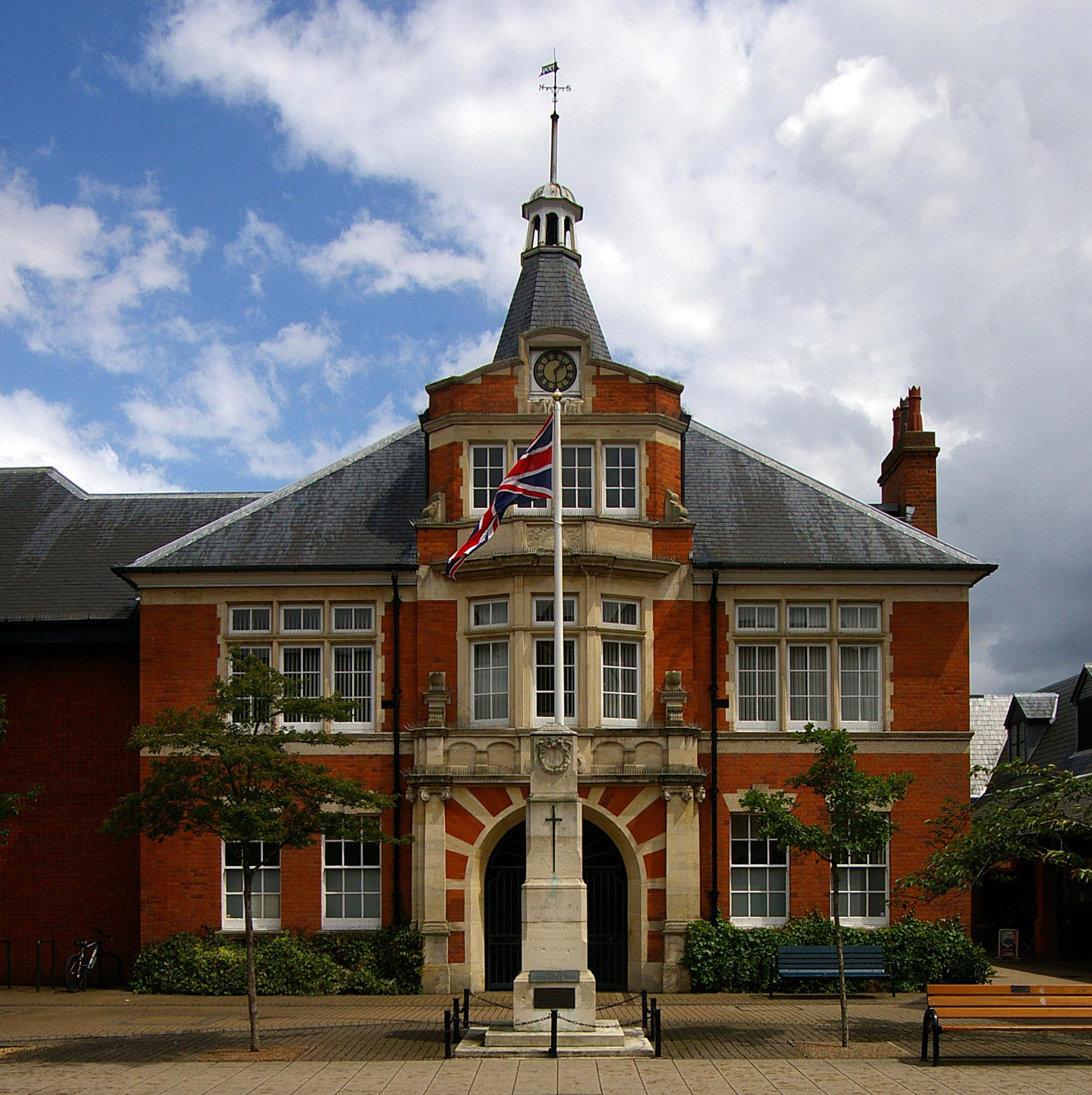
- New Malden Town Hall Facade

- Shown in Kingston upon Thames
- 51.4025°N 0.2561°W
- Location: High Street, New Malden

History
- Built: 1905

Site notes
- Architect: William Horace Pope
- Architectural style: Edwardian Baroque style

New Malden Town Hall was a municipal building in High Street, New Malden, London. It served as the headquarters of Municipal Borough of Malden and Coombe.

== History ==
In the late 19th century the local board of health had met at the back of the Holy Trinity Church in the High Street. (Note: The congregation of Holy Trinity Church was established as a breakaway group from Christ Church in New Malden led by the churchwarden, Frederick Merryweather (1827–1900), in 1870. The group erected Holy Trinity Church in 1882 and, after it fell into disuse in the early 20th century, it was acquired by a philanthropist, Graham Spicer (died 1918), who began providing bible classes and sporting activities for young men in the building. After Spicer's death this training activity was formalised as a charity known as the "Graham Spicer Institute".) After the formation of the Maldens and Coombe Urban District Council in 1895, civic leaders decided to procure purpose-built civic offices: the site chosen for the new building was a plot of open land just to the south of Holy Trinity Church.

The new building, which was designed by William Horace Pope, a council surveyor, in the Edwardian Baroque style, was officially opened on 27 April 1905. The design involved a symmetrical main frontage with three bays facing onto the High Street; the central section featured an arched doorway flanked by Ionic order pilasters on the ground floor; there was a bay window flanked by two other windows on the first floor and four smaller windows with an illuminated clock above on the second floor; a small turret was erected at roof level. The principal room was the council chamber which was capable of being used as a public hall for concerts and other events as well. A new fire station, which was constructed just to the south of the civic offices, was opened at the same time. New Malden War Memorial, dedicated to those who died in the First World War, was erected outside the civic offices and unveiled on 8 November 1924.

The building was renamed "New Malden Town Hall" when it became the headquarters of Municipal Borough of Malden and Coombe in 1936 but ceased to be the local seat of government when the Royal Borough of Kingston upon Thames was formed in 1965. The building subsequently became the home of the Malden Adult Education Centre.

In March 1988 much of the east side of the High Street between Duke's Avenue and King's Avenue, including the Holy Trinity Church, the town hall and the site of the former fire station (which had been demolished after the fire service re-located in 1978) was acquired by Waitrose. Planning consent was given for a new retail development on the site in April 1988, and, although the interior of the town hall was dismantled, the facade of the building was integrated into the new retail development which was opened by Waitrose on 19 September 1989.

== Sources ==
- Fifty Years in Malden: Civic Society and Town 1944–1994. The Malden And Coombe Civic Society. 1994. ISBN 978-0952308805.
