= No. 619 Squadron RAF =

Defunct flying squadron of the Royal Air Force

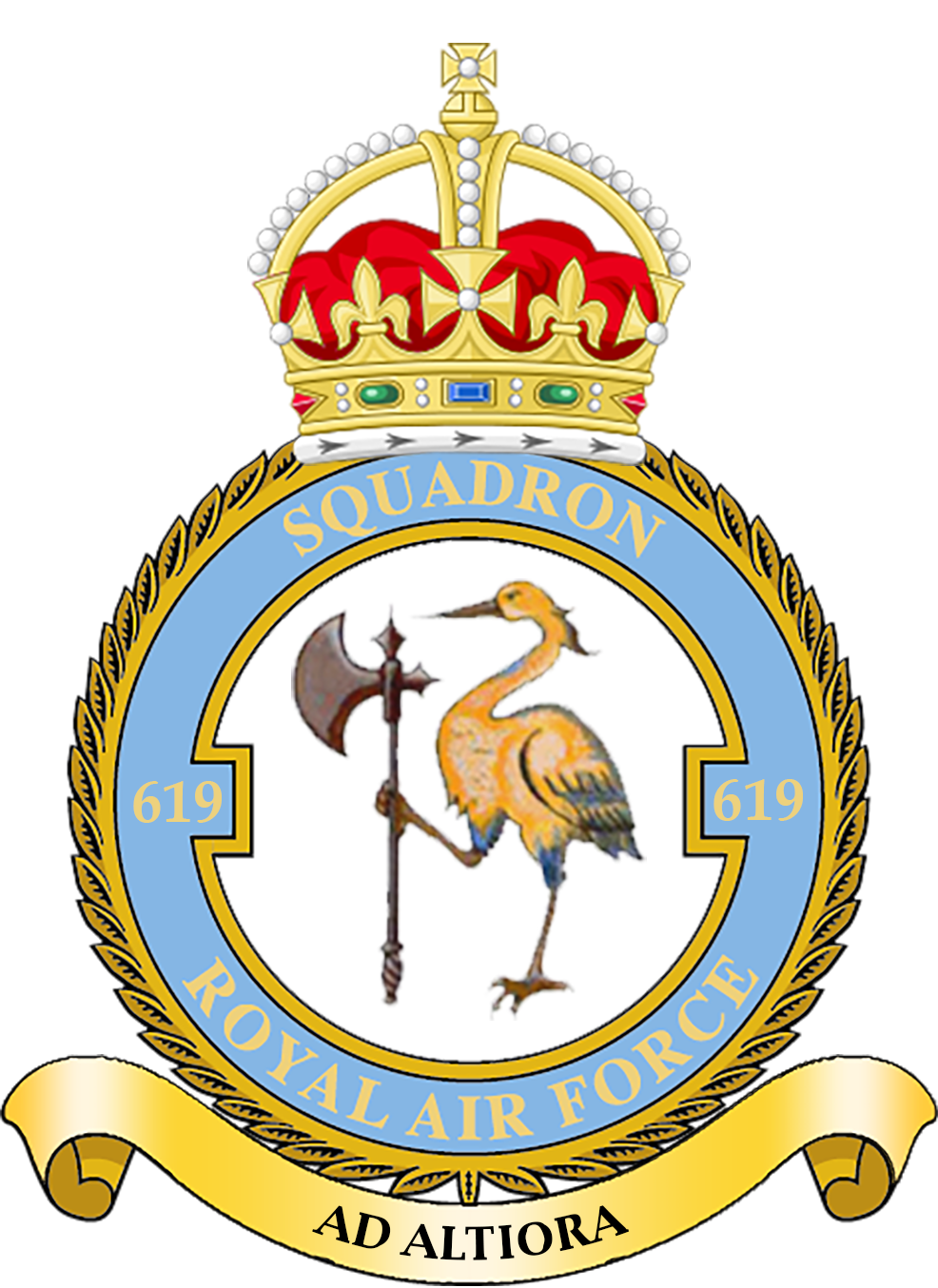
- 619 Squadron Badge
- Active: 18 April 1943 – 18 July 1945
- Country: United Kingdom
- Branch: Royal Air Force
- Type: Inactive
- Role: Heavy Bomber Squadron
- Part of: No. 5 Group, RAF Bomber Command
- Motto(s): Latin: Ad Altoria (Translation: "To higher things")

Insignia
- Squadron Badge heraldry: A heron vigilant, holding before him a battle axe with its right paw (unofficial)
- Squadron Codes: KV (Apr 1939 – Sep 1939 allocated, but never used); PG (Apr 1943 – Jul 1945)

Aircraft flown
- Bomber: Avro Lancaster; Four-engined heavy bomber
- Trainer: Airspeed Oxford; Twin-engined trainer

No. 619 Squadron RAF was a heavy bomber squadron of the Royal Air Force during the Second World War, flying Lancaster bombers from bases in Lincolnshire.

== History ==
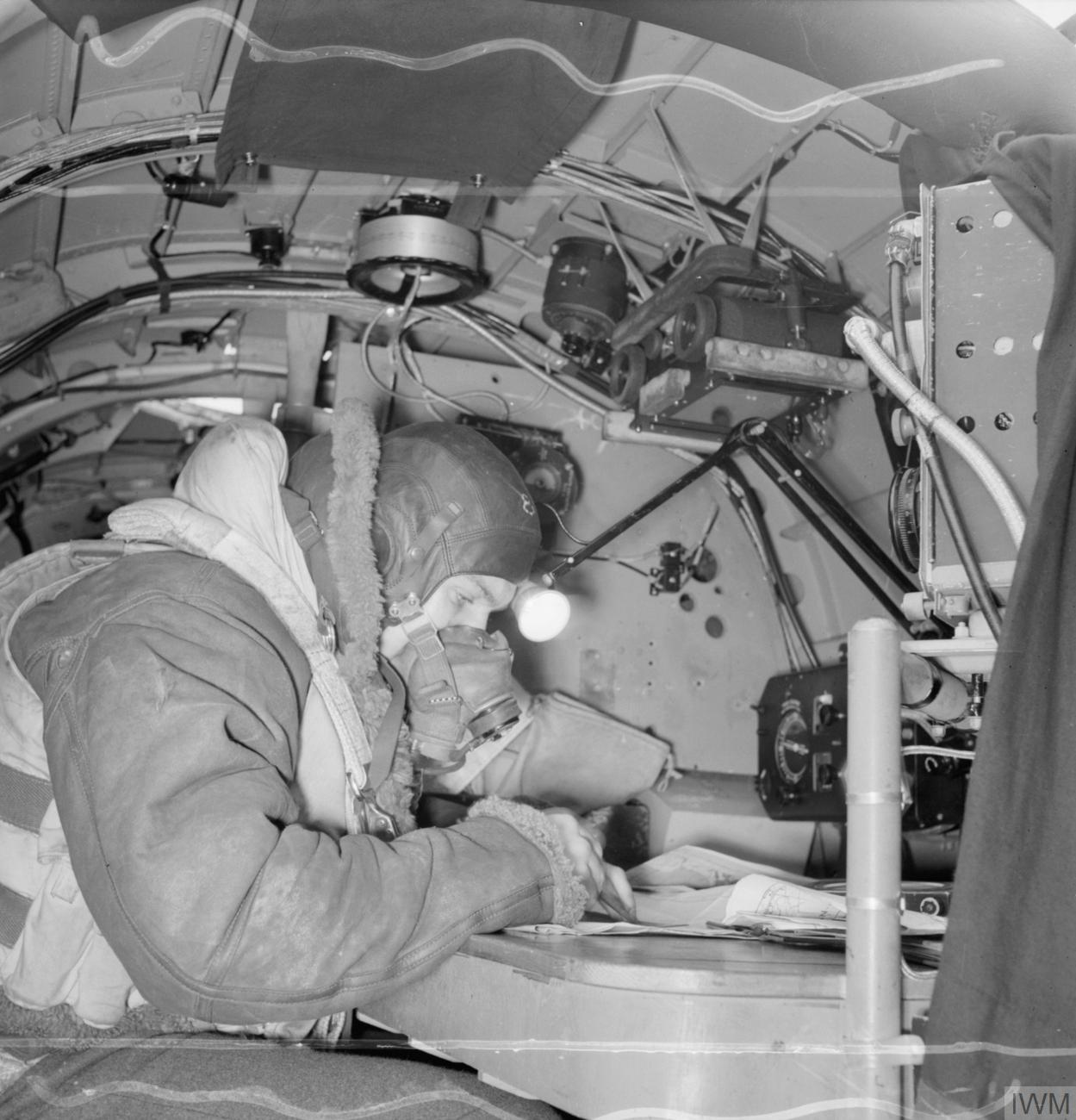
Flying Officer P Ingleby, the navigator of a Lancaster of No. 619 Squadron based at RAF Coningsby, seated at his table in the aircraft

The squadron was formed out of elements of 97 Squadron at RAF Woodhall Spa in Lincolnshire on 18 April 1943, equipped with Lancaster Mk.III bombers, as part of 5 Group in Bomber Command. It also flew Lancaster Mk.I bombers. Their first mission was flown in the night of 11 June 1943, when 12 Lancasters were sent to bomb targets in Düsseldorf, and the last bombing mission was flown on 25 April 1945, when 6 Lancasters tried to bomb Obersalzberg. The last operational mission was flown a day later, when 2 Lancasters laid mines in the Oslo Fjord near Horten. After that mission the squadron ferried ex-prisoners of war back to the United Kingdom from Belgium (Operation Exodus). The squadron operated out of various Lincolnshire stations, before being disbanded at RAF Skellingthorpe on 18 July 1945.

Members of the squadron were awarded 1 DSO, 76 DFCs and 37 DFMs. The squadron was mentioned 10 times in despatches.

== Aircraft operated ==
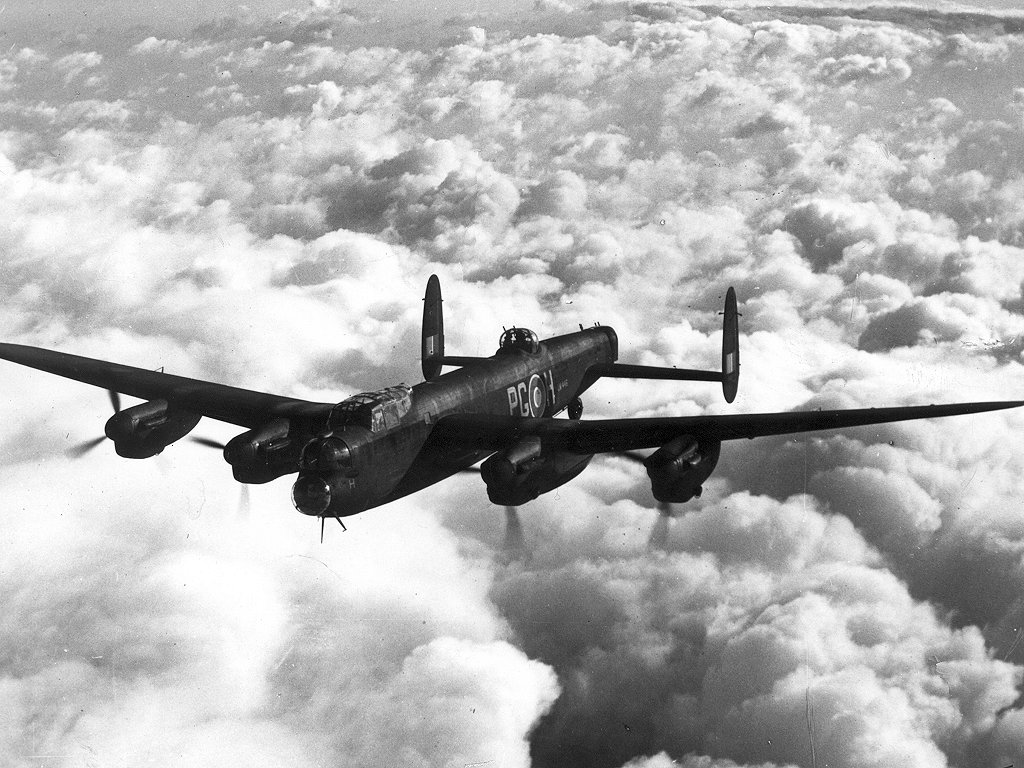
Lancaster LM446 of No. 619 Squadron, coded PG-H

Aircraft operated by no. 619 Squadron RAF, data from
From	To	Aircraft	Version
18 April 1943	18 September 1943	Airspeed Oxford	Mks.I, II
18 April 1943	18 July 1945	Avro Lancaster	Mks.I, III

== Squadron bases ==
Bases and airfields used by no. 619 Squadron RAF, data from
From	To	Base
18 April 1943	9 January 1944	RAF Woodhall Spa, Lincolnshire
9 January 1944	17 April 1944	RAF Coningsby, Lincolnshire
17 April 1944	28 September 1944	RAF Dunholme Lodge, Lincolnshire
28 September 1944	30 June 1945	RAF Strubby, Lincolnshire
30 June 1945	18 July 1945	RAF Skellingthorpe, Lincolnshire

== Notable people ==
- Charles Clarke: served as a bomb aimer, shot down in 1944, interned in Stalag Luft III, was a spotter and forger for the Great Escape, retired from RAF as an Air Commodore.
- Nick Knilans: American who served with the squadron from 1943 to 1944, later served with No. 617 Squadron RAF (the "Dambusters")

=== Commanding officers ===
Officers commanding no. 619 Squadron RAF, data from
From	To	Name
20 April 1943	17 August 1943	W/Cdr. I.J. McGhie, DFC
20 August 1943	4 December 1943	W/Cdr. W. Abercromby, DFC
4 December 1943	23 May 1944	W/Cdr. J.R. Jeudwine, OBE, DFC
23 May 1944	26 July 1944	W/Cdr. J.R. Maling, AFC
28 July 1944	21 February 1945	W/Cdr. A.R. Millward, DFC
21 February 1945	14 June 1945	W/Cdr. S.G. Birch, DFC
14 June 1945	18 July 1945	W/Cdr. Flett

== See also ==
- List of Royal Air Force aircraft squadrons
