= Municipal Borough of Malden and Coombe =

Former local government area in the UK

Coordinates: 51.40°N 0.26°W

Malden and Coombe
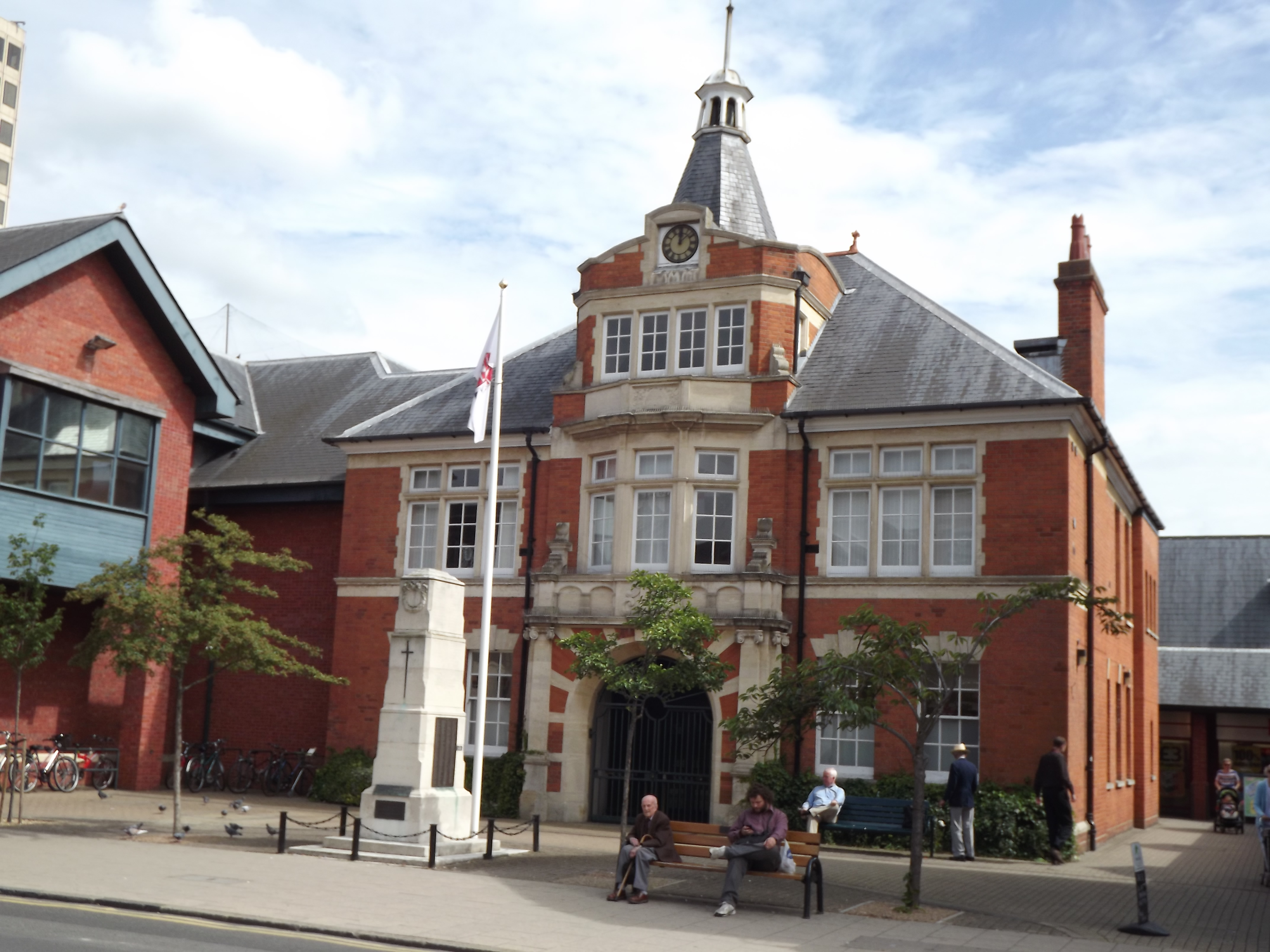
- New Malden Town Hall
- History
  - Created: 1866
  - Abolished: 1965
  - Succeeded by: Royal Borough of Kingston upon Thames
- Status: Local Government District (1866 - 1894); Urban district (1894 - 1936); Municipal Borough (from 1936)
- Government
  - Motto: Ducit Amor Oppidi (The love of our town leads us.)

Malden and Coombe was a local government district in Surrey, England from 1866 to 1965.

New Malden Local Government District was formed in 1866 under the Local Government Act 1858 from part of the ancient parish of Kingston upon Thames. It was governed by a local board of 12 members.

== History ==
Under the Local Government Act 1894 the area briefly became New Malden Urban District, with an elected urban district council replacing the local board. In the following year the neighbouring Kingston Rural District was abolished, and the two civil parishes of Malden and Coombe were added to New Malden to form The Maldens and Coombe Urban District.

In 1936 the urban district council successfully petitioned for a charter of incorporation, and the urban district became the Municipal Borough of Malden and Coombe.

Malden and Coombe Borough Council was granted a coat of arms on 14 May 1936.

The borough was abolished in 1965 under the London Government Act 1963, with its area becoming part of the Royal Borough of Kingston upon Thames in Greater London.

Further details appear under New Malden and Coombe.
