= Frank Peck =

Architect

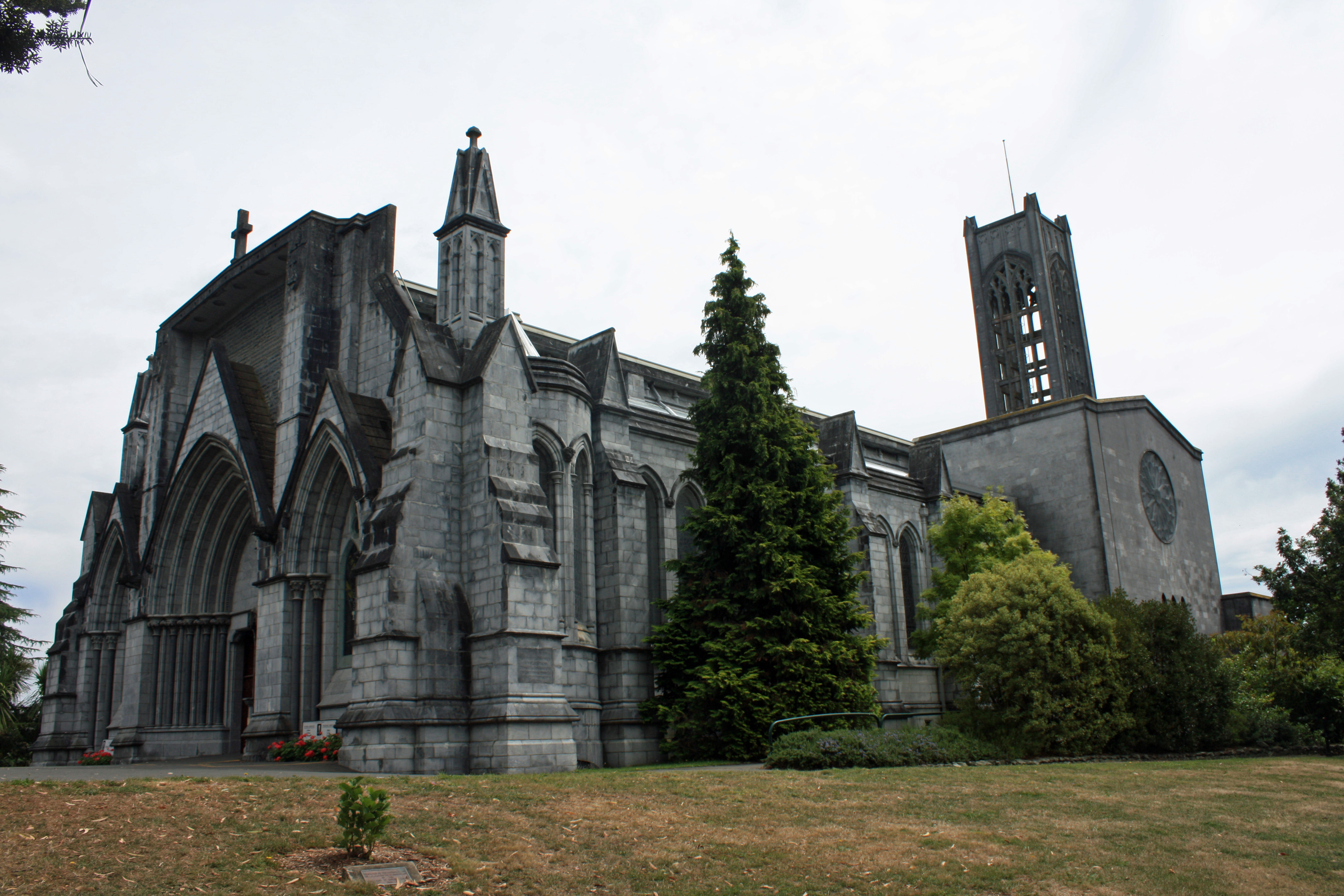
- Christ Church Cathedral, Nelson.
- Born: 1863
- Died: 11 September 1931 (aged 67–68); Nelson, New Zealand
- Education: Pupil of William Watkins (architect)
- Occupation: Architect
- Practice: 27 Old Queen Street, Westminster & Nelson, New Zealand
- Buildings: Petwood, Woodhall Spa and Christ Church Cathedral,

Frank Peck (1863–1931) was an architect who was articled to Watkins and Scorer of Lincoln (1879–84).

== Career ==
He started work with Edward I'Anson in 1884 and then worked as Chief Assistant to Aston Webb between 1887 and 1895. He became an ARIBA in 1898 and set up an office at 27 Old Queen's Street, Westminster. He was responsible for designing Government Offices and also industrial complexes. In 1908 he designed the 1st phase of Grace Marple's Petwood at Woodhall Spa and in 1910 a very early sugar beet factory at Sleaford, which never appears to have been built. He was elected an FRIBA in 1914. In 1915 he left England to settle in New Zealand, as he was unable to get sufficient work as the result of the War. He became the architect for a major Gothic Cathedral at Nelson in New Zealand. The cathedral was not fully completed, as a result of an earthquake in 1924.

== Architectural work ==
=== Churches ===
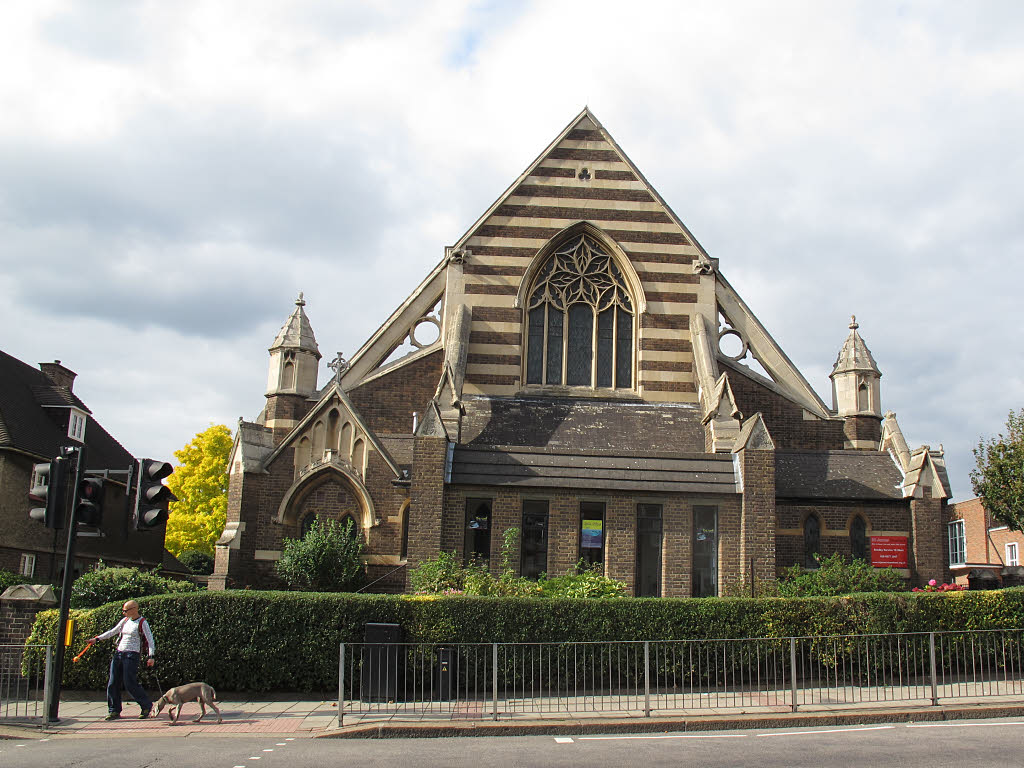
St James Church, West Streatham

- St Paul's Church, Kingston Hill, Surrey.
- St James’ Church, Streatham, London.(1910–12)
- St Saviour's Church, St Albans. Rood screen, Lady Chapel Interior.
- St Peter's, Woodhall Spa. -design for tower and spire.
- St Agnes, Spital, Windsor. New aisle.

==== New Zealand ====
- Presbyterian Church, Motueka. (1917)

=== Houses ===
- Pond's Farm, Beaconsfield.

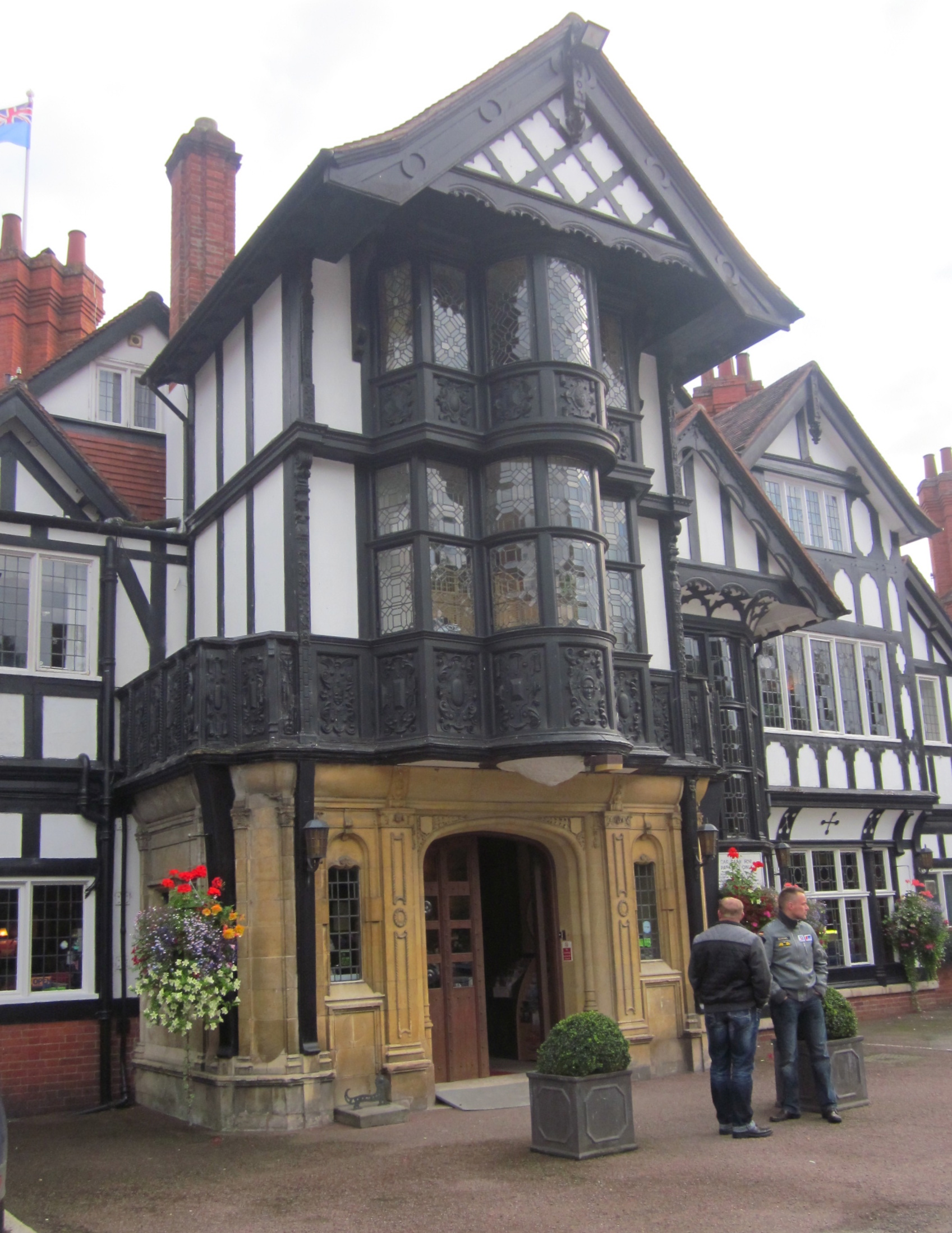
Petwood, Woodhall Spa

- No.10 The Avenue, Lincoln. (1892) Queen Anne style. Brick. One bay to right, set between central wide arched recessed doorway and wide two storey canted bay windows to the right. Extended dormer cutting across the eaves, and balcony with set-back window above arch with balcony. Bay windows with six panes in upper sash and single pane in lower sash.
- Petwood, Woodhall Spa, Lincolnshire. (1905). Commissioned by Grace Maple, heiress of the furniture-store owner Sir John Blundell Maple. The bungalow first proposed in 1905 didn't meet her lavish tastes and the project quickly grew wings under architect the Frank Peck. The extended house became a grand affair of “Tudor to Jacobean” style.
- Tummers, Chalfont Grove, Buckinghamshire.
- Doctor's House, Goldhill, Buckinghamshire.

== Literature ==
- Antram N (revised), Pevsner N & Harris J, (1989), The Buildings of England: Lincolnshire, Yale University Press.
- Antonia Brodie (ed), Directory of British Architects, 1834–1914: 2 Vols, British Architectural Library, Royal Institute of British Architects, 2001

== On-line ==
- N.Z. Building Progress April 1917. (pg.921)
- N.Z. Building Progress April 1917. (pg.922)
