= No. 627 Squadron RAF =

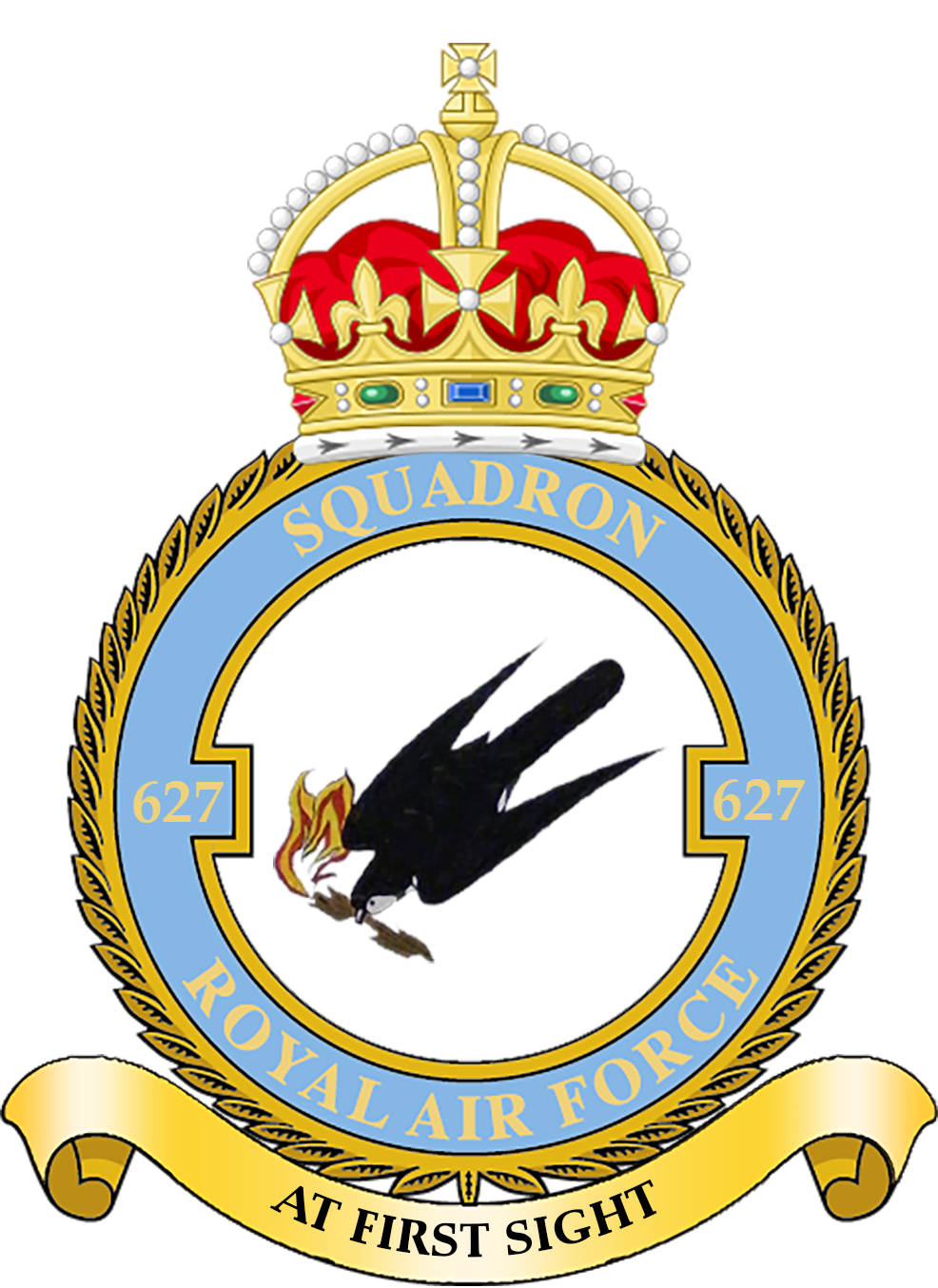
- Official Squadron badge of No. 627 Squadron RAF
- Active: 12 November 1943 – 1 October 1945
- Country: United Kingdom
- Branch: Royal Air Force
- Role: Pathfinder Bomber Squadron
- Motto: At First Sight

Insignia
- Squadron Badge heraldry: A hawk diving, holding in the beak a firebrand The badge symbolises two of the unit's wartime functions - high-level bombing and target marking for the main heavy bomber force.
- Squadron Codes: AZ (November 1943 – October 1945)

Aircraft flown
- Bomber: de Havilland Mosquito; Twin-engined light fighter-bomber

No. 627 Squadron was a Royal Air Force Mosquito aircraft pathfinder bomber squadron that operated during the Second World War.

== History ==
The squadron was formed on 12 November 1943 at RAF Oakington from part of 139 Squadron. It was equipped with the de Havilland Mosquito twin-engined fighter-bomber it flew operations as part of No. 8 Group's light bomber force. As well as normal bombing missions it also carried out Pathfinder duties and was involved in attacks on Berlin in early 1944. In April 1944 it was transferred to No. 5 Group as a specialised target marking squadron, although it also carried out armed reconnaissance and normal bombing duties. It was disbanded on 1 October 1945 at RAF Woodhall Spa when it was re-numbered 109 Squadron.

== Aircraft operated ==
Aircraft operated by No. 627 Squadron RAF
From	To	Aircraft	Variant
November 1943	September 1945	De Havilland Mosquito	Mk.IV
July 1944	September 1945	De Havilland Mosquito	Mk.XX
October 1944	September 1945	De Havilland Mosquito	Mk.XXV
March 1945	September 1945	De Havilland Mosquito	Mk.XVI

== Squadron bases ==
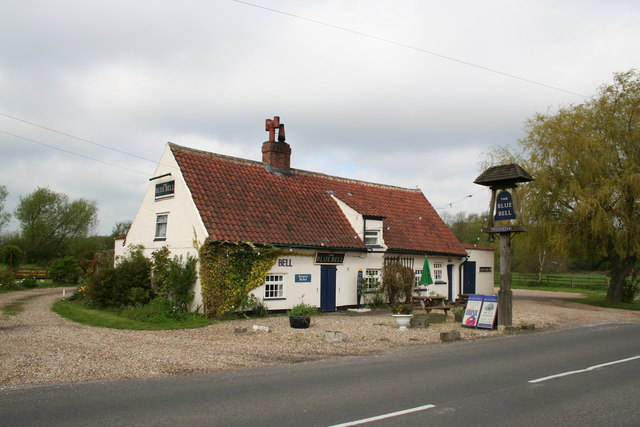
The Blue Bell. A Lincolnshire country inn with a history dating back to ca.1250. Reputedly haunted, visited by King Henry VIII and popular with 617 and 627 squadrons RAF during the war.

Bases and airfields used by No. 627 Squadron RAF
From	To	Base
November 1943	April 1944	RAF Oakington, Cambridgeshire
April 1944	September 1945	RAF Woodhall Spa, Lincolnshire

== Commanding officers ==
Officers commanding No. 627 squadron
From	To	Name
13 November 1943	3 June 1944	W/Cdr. R.P. Elliott, DSO, DFC*
3 June 1944	22 January 1945	W/Cdr. G.W. Curry, DSO, DFC*
22 January 1945	17 March 1945	W/Cdr. B.R.W. Hallows, DFC
10 April 1945	1 June 1945	W/Cdr. R. Kingsford-Smith, DSO, DFC, RAAF
1 June 1945	30 September 1945	W/Cdr. C. W. Scott AFC, RNZAF

== See also ==
- List of Royal Air Force aircraft squadrons
- Pathfinder
