= Oslo Mosquito raid =

Oslo Mosquito raid may refer to:

- Oslo Mosquito raid (1942)
- Oslo Mosquito raid (1944)
