= De Havilland Mosquito operational history =

History for British light bomber

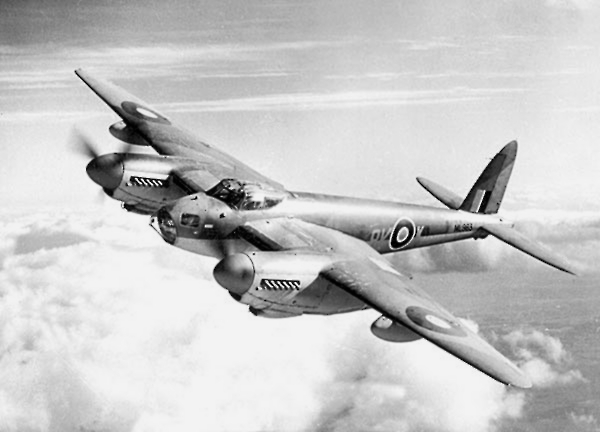
Mosquito B XVI of 571 Squadron, 1944

The de Havilland Mosquito was a British light bomber that served in many roles during and after the Second World War. Mosquito-equipped squadrons performed medium bomber, reconnaissance, tactical strike, anti-submarine warfare and shipping attack and night fighter duties, both defensive and offensive. Mosquitos were widely used by the RAF Pathfinder Force, which marked targets for night-time strategic bombing. Despite an initially high loss rate due to low-level daylight attack operations, the Mosquito ended the war with the lowest losses of any of the aircraft types in RAF Bomber Command service.

== Performance ==
On its introduction to service, the aircraft was about as fast as the German fighters that opposed it, particularly the Bf 109F and the Fw 190A. Although the differential in speed was low, the agility of the Mosquito was often an advantage. Aerial interception usually occurred when enemy fighters had already been "scrambled" by reports of visual sightings as the flights crossed the Continental coastlines. Occasionally, the daylight low-level raiding Mosquito squadrons simply had bad luck, as was the case with the Oslo Mosquito raid, 25 September 1942, when a crack Luftwaffe squadron of Focke-Wulf Fw 190 fighters of 3/JG 5 had just arrived in Norway.

In the first few years of Mosquito service, most of the dedicated Luftwaffe night fighter groups were equipped with aircraft such as the Bf 110 or Junkers Ju 88, both of lower performance. There were enemy attempts to address this but problems included engine troubles and the intensifying Allied bombing campaign, especially as the USAAF daylight bombing started to complement the RAF Bomber Command campaign. In terms of better propeller-driven night fighters, the Heinkel He 219 and Junkers Ju 388 simply did not enter large-scale production.

With the introduction of the nitrous oxide-boosted Messerschmitt Bf 109 G series and, in the spring of 1944, the jet-powered Me 262, the Luftwaffe had relatively low numbers of fighters with a speed and altitude capability (Note: Maximum speed: 900 km/h (559 mph); Service ceiling: 11,450 m (37,565 ft)) effectively to intercept the pressurised variants of Mosquito. But the German High Command would not give clear orders for their quantity production, which in any case would have been difficult because construction work had to be taken further east and carried out in concealed factories and tunnels. Aircraft fuel supplies were by then also becoming highly critical for the Nazis. Hitler in particular was at this stage fixated on "vengeance" weapons rather than fighters, denying leaders such as Adolf Galland any effective resources.

Nevertheless, on 25 July 1944, a PRXVI Mosquito from No. 544 Squadron RAF was intercepted in the Munich area and attacked by Leutnant Alfred Schreiber, flying an Me 262 A-1a. The German fighter made six passes at the Mosquito MM 273, crewed by F/L A.E. Wall and F/O A.S. Lobban, but they managed to escape into cloud after violent evasive manoeuvers, making an emergency landing at Fermo airfield in Italy. (Note: This is believed to be the first such case involving a Mosquito. Birtles gives general recognition to the story. MM273 PRXVI was transferred to the Royal Navy as 140/4/RN 728 and eventually crashed into the sea during a single-engine landing in Malta on 31 Oct. 1950 (authenticated by ORB records). The German-sourced version has a discrepancy of one day in the date of Shreiber's attack and describes damage to the airframe on landing in Italy.) The PR Mk 32 photo reconnaissance Mosquito design attempted to counter the threat of the German jets with extended, long-span wings, special high-altitude superchargers and the elimination of as much weight as possible, raising its cruising altitude to 42,000 ft (13,000 m), above the service ceiling of the Me 262.

== RAF Bomber Command ==
Media related to De Havilland Mosquito B at Wikimedia Commons

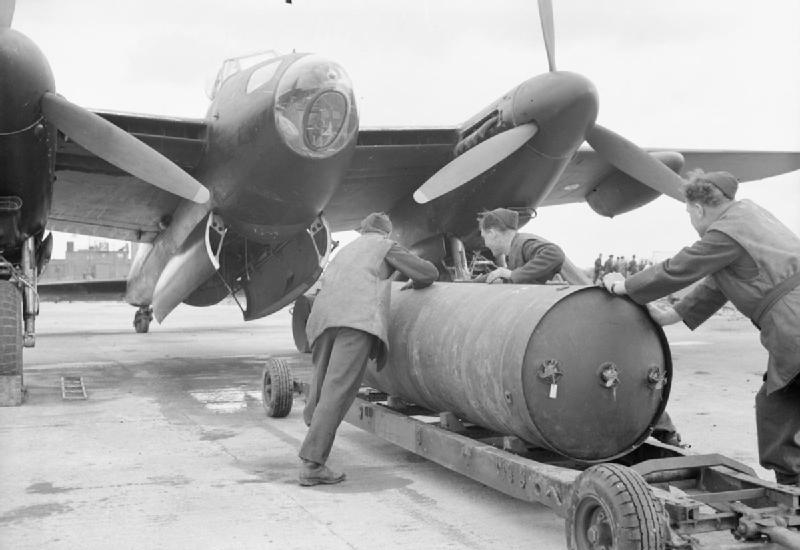
Loading a 4,000-pound "Cookie" into a 692 Squadron B Mk IV (modified) at RAF Graveley, 1944

=== Low-level Daylight Attack Phase ===
From around the start of June 1942 to the end of May 1943, the two RAF Squadrons who were the first to be equipped with Mosquito Mk. B.IV bombers operated as a low-level daylight bomber force in precision raids. On 15 November 1941, 105 Squadron, RAF, took delivery at RAF Swanton Morley, Norfolk, of the first operational Mosquito Mk. B.IV, serial no. W4064. No. 150 Squadron also had the first Mosquito to enter service (W4066). For nearly a year, in 1942 and 1943, 105 Sdn., based next at RAF Horsham St. Faith, then from 29 September, RAF Marham, undertook daylight low-level and shallow dive attacks. (Note: The main author of "Low Attack," John de L. Wooldridge, became Wing Commander of No. 105 Squadron in March 1943. First published in 1944, it is a valuable contemporary first-hand account of the daylight low-level, pinpoint raiding phase of the Mosquito operations. The book's frontispiece is a map showing eighteen towns and cities in whose regions the attacks took place - several of these had more than one visit by the squadrons. It contains a commendation of the skill and high courage of the aircrews by Air Chief Marshal Sir Arthur Harris, referring to attacks on targets of first importance to the German war effort. This was at a time when the massed heavy night bomber raids were not yet fully mobilised.). On 29 August 1942, Mk IVs of 105 Squadron RAF undertook a bombing mission against Pont-à-Vendin. They were attacked head-on by Focke-Wulf Fw 190s that then turned to fire again from the stern. The Mosquitos used their speed to outpace the 190s. On 19 September, Mosquitos attacked Berlin for the first time in daylight. Once again, when a Mosquito piloted by D.A.G ″George″ Parry was attacked by Messerschmitt Bf 109s, he was able to outrun them. One Mosquito failed to return. Another of the early low-level missions was the Oslo Mosquito Raid (1942), carried out by four aircraft of No. 105 Squadron RAF, after which the Mosquito was publicly revealed for the first time.

The second squadron to be re-equipped with the Mosquito bombers was 139 Squadron, (Note: Known as "Jamaica" Squadron to honour the island which subscribed to twelve Blenheims before 1941.) based alongside No. 105 Sqn. at RAF Horsham St. Faith and then Marham. Their aircraft started to be delivered in September 1942; meanwhile they shared some machines of No. 105 Squadron. On 6 December 1942 Mosquitos from 105 and 139 Squadrons participated in Operation Oyster, the 2 Group daylight raid against the Philips works at Eindhoven. During the months from mid-1942 to the end of May 1943, they participated in the low-level daylight attack phase described by Wooldridge, including the first day of Berlin raids.

=== First Berlin raids ===
On 30 January 1943, two daylight missions were carried out to bomb Berlin using low-level daylight tactics. These attacks were timed to disrupt speeches by Reichsmarschall Hermann Göring, head of the air force, and Joseph Goebbels, the Third Reich's Propaganda Minister. The first, in the morning, comprised a flight of three Mosquito B Mk. IVs from 105 Squadron, which attacked the main Berlin broadcasting station, at 11:00, when Göring was due to address a parade commemorating the 10th anniversary of the Nazis' being voted into power. The mission gave the lie to Göring's claim that such a mission was impossible, and kept Göring off the air for more than an hour. A second flight of Mosquitos from 139 Squadron followed in the afternoon of the same day to attempt to interrupt a speech by Goebbels at the Sports Palace. Once again, they bombed at the exact planned time. However, Berlin's anti-aircraft defences were on the alert and a Mosquito flown by Squadron Leader D.F.W. Darling DFC was shot down, killing both Darling and his navigator. Göring was enraged; six weeks later he harangued aircraft manufacturers that he could "go berserk" when faced with the Mosquito, which made him "green and yellow with envy".

=== Pathfinder operations ===
Within Bomber Command, Pathfinder Operations were set up by (at the time) Acting Group Captain Donald Bennett, who was appointed Commander of Pathfinders (PFF) on 5 July 1942 After completing its initial Oboe trials work, No. 109 Squadron RAF moved with its Mosquito B.IV's to RAF Wyton in August 1942. There it joined the re-formed No 8 (Pathfinder Force) Group, where the newly appointed Donald Bennett had just set up his HQ. (Note: Bennett was quickly impressed with the performance of the Mosquito and test-flew it himself by day and night, defending its potential against skeptics in the Air Ministry who opposed its large-scale introduction in the role. ibid, p. 203.) A calibration sortie over enemy territory took place on 20/21 December, using six 109 Sqn. Mosquitos to locate and bomb a power station at Lutterade in Holland. Then on 31 December/1 January 1943, 109 Squadron pioneered PFF Oboe target marking for eight Lancaster bombers that attacked Düsseldorf. (Note: Around the same time, the No. 1409 Flight RAF (Meteorological Flight) was transferred to Bomber Command, and placed under No. 8 Group. Bennett attached great importance to its services, and gives its crews special mention in his autobiography. Because the duties were performed in PR marks of Mosquito, this is discussed in the section below on Photo Reconnaissance Units.)

Mosquito bombers were soon an important aircraft within PFF operations. They became the main element of the Light Night Striking Force (LNSF) and from early in 1943, they were used for target marking, particularly in the initial phases of the raid, when their pyrotechnics would be followed up by additions from the heavy Pathfinder bombers. (Note: On 13 Jan 1943 Bennett was promoted to Air Commodore and No. 8 PFF Group became an autonomous command, formally No. 8 Group. At this stage, PFF operations had just started to include active service missions by 109 Sqn. Oboe-equipped Mosquito B.IV's.) The LNSF carried out high speed night raids with precision aiming and navigation. Their mission was twofold: they targeted small but vital installations; and acted as a diversion from the raids of the heavy bombers, simulating large formations through the use of Window. On nights when no heavy bomber raid was planned, the LNSF would continue to deny the German air defences a rest by means of 'nuisance raids' that were of increasing ferocity as the Group acquired more Mosquito bombers.

On 1 June 1943, the two pioneering Squadrons, 105 and 139, joined No. 109 Squadron within the LNSF whose "nuisance raids" were already gaining approval from Harris and Churchill. Initially they were engaged in moderately high level (about 10 000 ft.) night bombing, diversionary raids and dropping Window. They made 67 trips that summer, mainly to Berlin. Soon after, some of the 105 Squadron aircraft were equipped with Oboe. In June 1943 109 Squadron received Mosquito B.IX's, also fitted for Oboe, and with their higher altitude capability they were able to extend its range. Other Mosquito Squadrons were added to No.8 PF Group with better Marks of the bomber, starting with B.IX's going to 139 Squadron. (Note: By these gains in altitude and through technical improvements to the Oboe system itself, plus moving the transmitters forward into France after D-day, the usefulness of the accurate Oboe system was retained throughout the war.)

From around December 1943, the Siren Tour series of spoof raids were deployed by the LNSF, mostly in northern Germany.

As Mosquito bomber production increased towards the end of 1943, No. 627 Squadron RAF was one of the first new bomber squadron to be added to the PFF. Based at RAF Oakington, it was staffed from part of 139 Squadron and equipped at first with B.IV's. It was involved in PFF attacks on Berlin in early 1944. (Note: It was the Mosquitos from this squadron that Bennett was ordered by Harris, AOC-in-C, to give up, some time in April 1944, when No. 627 was detached to No. 5 Group and used alongside No. 617 Squadron RAF for low-level marking. After the unique events of Operation Chastise, there was a serious difference of opinion between Bennett and Ralph Cochrane over the feasibility and safety of the low-level marking techniques developed by Leonard Cheshire.) No. 627 also attempted the second attack on Victoria Terresa (Oslo Mosquito Raid (1942))

Bennett was permitted to add considerably to the number of PFF Mosquito Squadrons - by May 1945 there were twelve of these, including the detached No. 627 Sqn. which was in No. 5 Group. The expanding PFF Mosquito squadrons visited all of the well-known targets in Germany including Berlin, Hamburg, Cologne, Essen, Mannheim, Hanover, and Duisburg. They took part in many bombing operations as pathfinders, marking targets with flares for the massed formations of heavy bombers. (Note: Bomber Command Mosquitos, mainly those of No. 8 Group, flew over 28,000 operations, dropping 35,000 tons (31,751 tonnes) of bombs, and losing 193 aircraft in the process (an overall loss rate of 0.7%, compared with an overall 2.2% loss rate for the four-engined heavies).) Once the B.XVI variants with enlarged bomb bays were brought into service in February 1944, they dropped 4,000-lb blast bombs ("cookies") which were used on many raids, making the force a formidable weapon in its own right. During 20/21 February to 27/28 March 1945 inclusive, No. 139 squadron made a series of 36 consecutive night attacks on Berlin with these large bombs. (Note: Over the complete war, No. 139 Squadron flew more than 4000 operational sorties, active from first to last, starting with the Battle of France on 3 September 1939 when Flying Officer A. McPherson won a DFC for crossing the German frontier in Blenheim IV N6215 to reconnoitre and photograph the German Fleet, and ending on 3 May 1945 by bombing Kiel with a flight of 14 Mosquitos.)

During the allied advance across France, the Pathfinder group, due to the persistence of Vice Marshall Bennett, expanded its brief to perform short notice raids, such as the blind bombing, using Oboe, of the road from Falaise on 19 August 1944, as well as of St. Vith crossroads, during the Battle of the Bulge. The group also developed techniques for destroying railway tunnels by "skip bombing" delayed fuse bombs into tunnel mouths, and destroyed numerous other targets immediately behind the German lines as its brief was widened, along with that of the Mosquitos of No. 100 Group Bomber Command, to attack the enemy almost wherever they saw fit. The task of destroying V-1 launching sites was given to the group, as well as to others. It is the efficiency of these raids by Mosquitos that provides the generally quoted improvement of about 5 times over other bombers. It is estimated by the RAF that it took only 40 tons of bombs on average for them to destroy a site, versus 165 tons for a B-17, 182 tons for a B-26, and 219 for a B-29.

A Mosquito B.IX holds the record for the most combat missions flown by an Allied bomber in the Second World War. LR503, known as "F for Freddie" because of its squadron code letters, GB*F, first served with 109 and subsequently 105 Squadron of the RAF. It flew 213 sorties during the war, only to crash on 10 May 1945, two days after VE Day at Calgary airport during the 8th Victory Loan Bond Drive, killing both the pilot Flt. Lt. Maurice Briggs, DSO, DFC, DFM and navigator Fl. Off. John Baker, DFC and Bar.

=== Bomber Support ===
In 1943 Luftwaffe night fighters were causing serious losses by attacking the bomber streams over Germany. Consequently, the decision was taken to set up 100 Group within Bomber Command. This new Group commenced operations on 8 November 1943 under Air Cdr. E. B. Addison. The Group's initial squadrons were No. 169 Squadron RAF and No. 239 Squadron RAF. Not long after, No. 141 Squadron RAF, based at RAF West Raynham, also joined them. On the night of 16/17 December, during the Battle of Berlin, one of their aircraft scored Bomber Command's first intruder success using the Serrate radar detector in a Mosquito NF.II, when they damaged a Bf 110 with cannon fire. (Note: No. 141 Squadron was already experienced in the use of Serrate, since they had flown intensive trials with it, mounted in Beaufighters at RAF Drem in May 1943. Changing to Mosquitos and using it in conjunction with AI, improved the success rate - the faster and more agile Mosquitos were better able to circle back behind the enemy fighters and make the attack.) No. 85 Squadron RAF was transferred to the Group on 1 May 1944, operating from RAF Swannington. The top Mosquito ace of 100 Group was the distinguished Wing Commander Branse Burbridge, who made 13 claims during his time in this squadron, between 1944 and the end of the war in Europe.

The 100 Group squadrons used progressively better marks of Mosquito according to their roles: NF XIXs and NF 30s were used for dedicated night fighter operations, providing escorts for the bomber streams; F Mk IIs and FB Mk VIs were used for "Flower" operations (patrolling enemy airfields ahead of the main stream and bombing to keep enemy night fighters on the ground as well as attacking night fighters in the landing pattern) and "Mahmoud" operations, in which, operating independently of bomber stream activity, the squadrons flew to assembly points for German night fighters and attacked them there. B Mk IVs and PR Mk XVIs were used for Electronic Intelligence (ELINT) operations, aiming to detect German radar and radio transmissions.

Some 258 Luftwaffe night fighters were claimed by the Group (unconfirmed), for the loss of some 70 Mosquitos. The omnipresence of the potent night fighter threat led to what the Luftwaffe crews dubbed "Moskitoschreck" (Mosquito terror), since the German aircrews were never sure when or where they might come under attack. Indirectly this led to a high proportion of enemy aircraft and crew losses from crashes as night fighters hurried in to land to avoid the Mosquito threat, whether real or imagined.

=== Highball variants ===
When Barnes Wallis was designing the Upkeep bouncing bomb to destroy German dams, he also designed a smaller version — Highball — for enemy shipping. It was decided that the Mosquito was an ideal aircraft for the purpose. Hence 618 Squadron was formed on 1 April 1943 under Coastal Command. (Note: Some members of Bomber Command's Nos. 105 and 139 Squadrons provided the initial crews). The role of the new unit was to attack enemy shipping, giving priority to the German battleship Tirpitz.

Mosquito conversions were made to aircraft of the Mk IV series II. Bomb bay doors were removed and specialised carriers were fitted for two Highballs weighing 1,280 lb (580 kg) each. Before release these were spun at 700 to 900 rpm by a ram air turbine in the bomb bay, fed by an air scoop. These weapons were to be dropped from a maximum altitude of 60 ft (20 m) at a speed of 360 mph (600 km/h). Highball was never used operationally since, on 12 November 1944, Tirpitz was sunk by RAF Lancasters carrying Tallboy bombs, in Operation Catechism.

The unit was then selected for carrier-borne operations in the Pacific, but again, not used in warfare. (Note: Details of the modifications to 25 Mosquito B Mk IVs for this proposed action are to be found in the Article on 618 Squadron) These Mosquitos were transported to Australia on board the carriers HMS Fencer and Striker, arriving on 23 December 1944. In order to keep up aircrew proficiency and safeguard the modified Mosquitos, 12 disassembled FB Mk VIs were also sent, arriving in Sydney in February 1945. These were reassembled at de Havilland Australia's Mascot factory. The unit was disbanded at RAAF Narromine in July 1946.

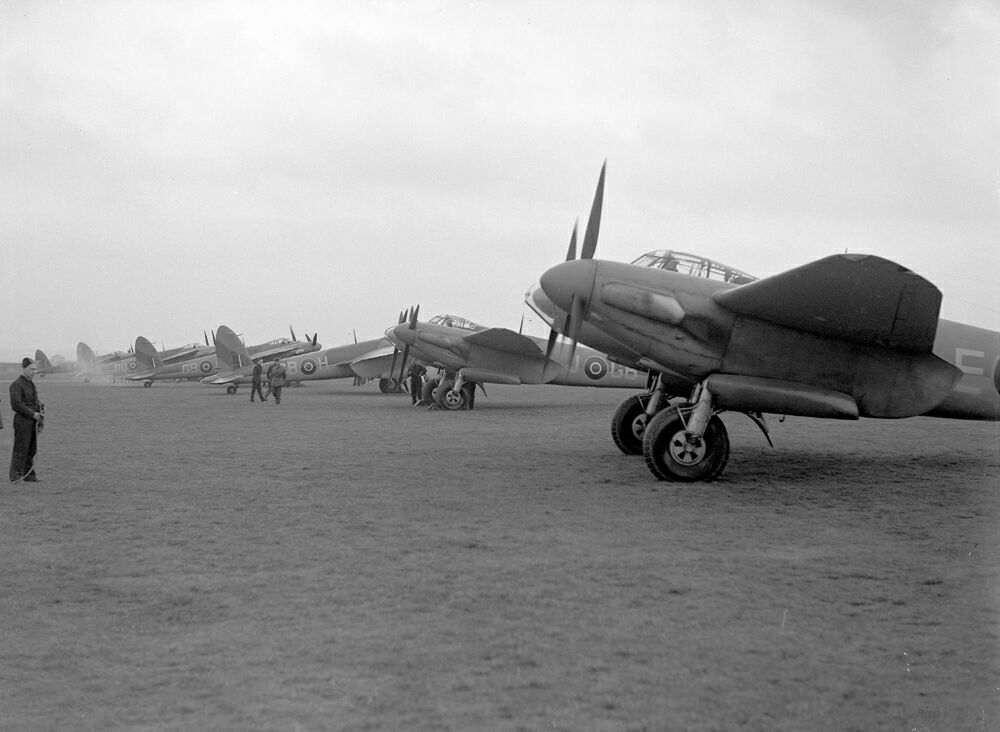
Start up checks (105 Squadron)

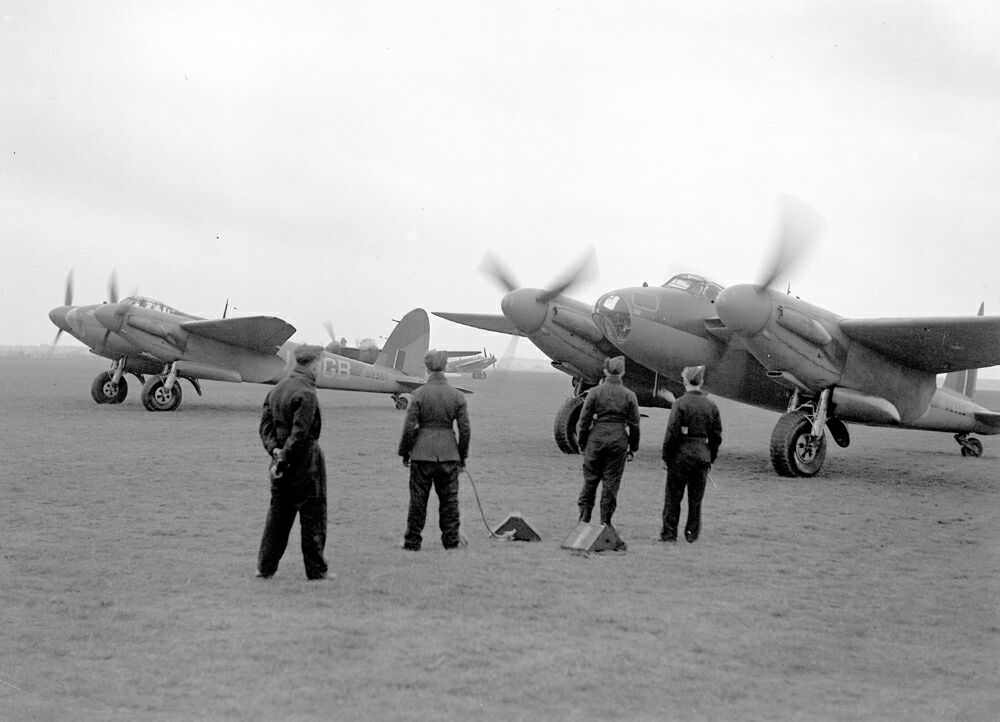
Warming up prior to taxiing (105 Squadron)

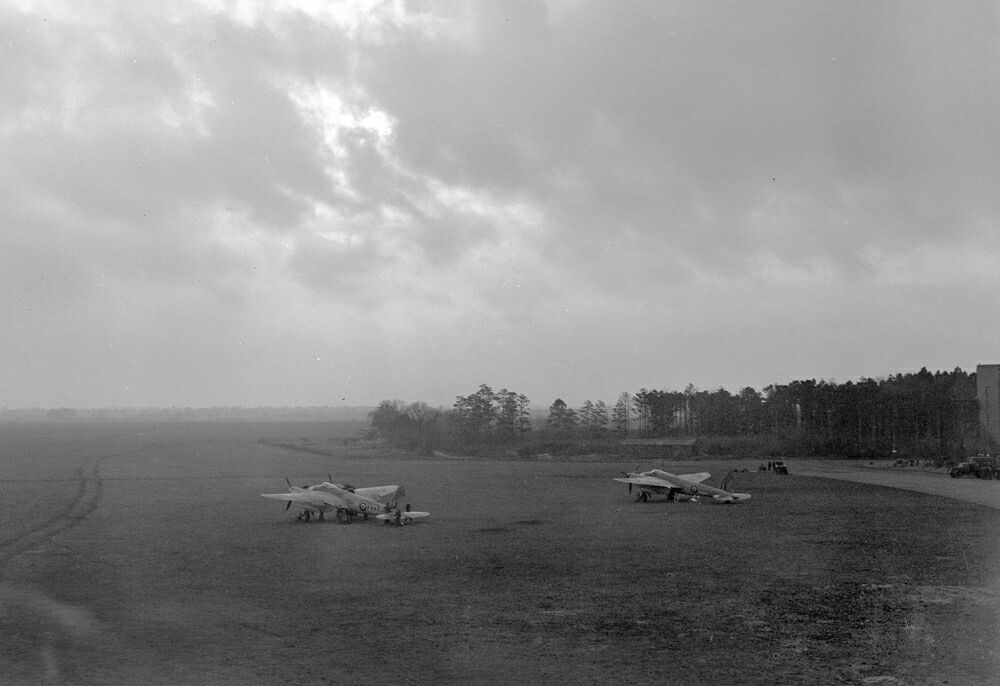
Somewhere in England (139 Squadron)

== Night fighter operations ==
Media related to De Havilland Mosquito NF at Wikimedia Commons

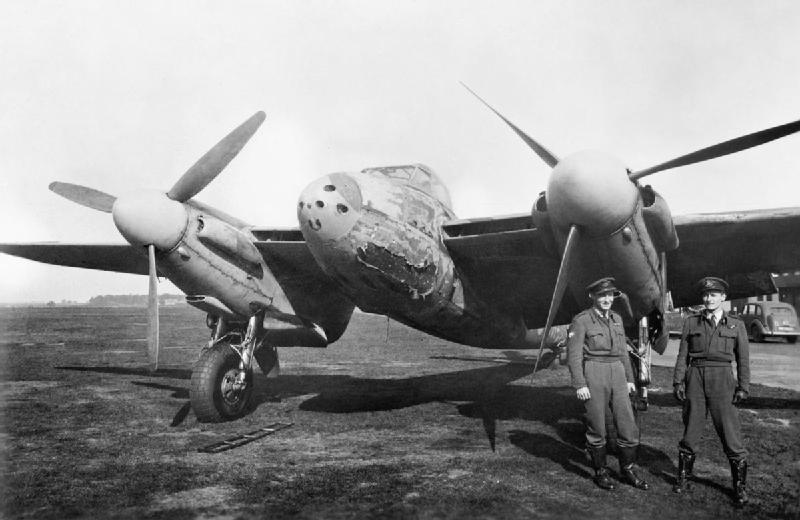
NF Mk II of No. 410 Squadron RCAF at RAF Coleby Grange, September 1943, showing severe damage from an exploding Dornier Do 17 the crew destroyed over the Netherlands the night before

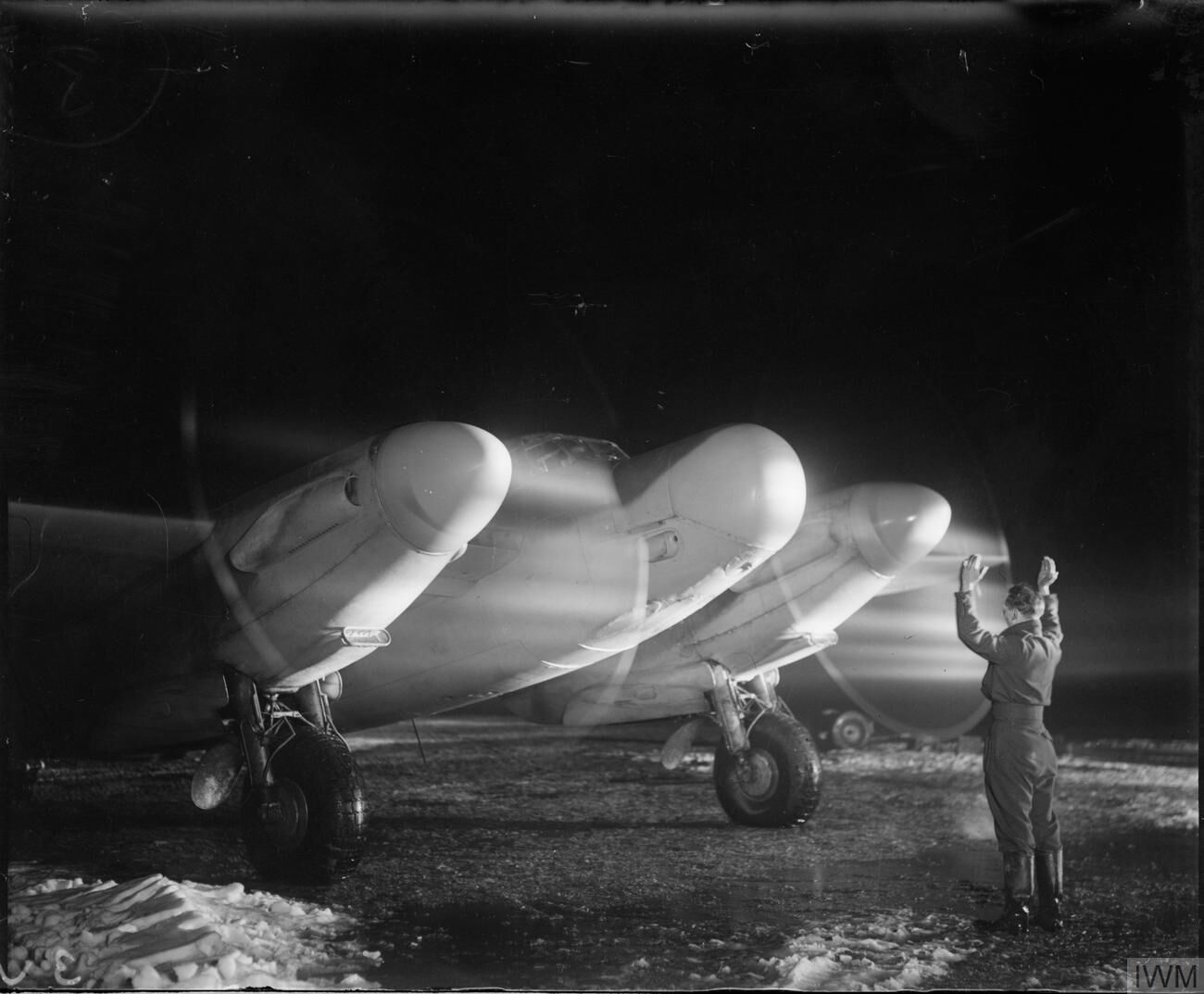
NF Mk XIII of No. 604 Squadron RAF about to take off for a night sortie from B51/Lille-Vendeville, France, for a night sortie, circa 1945

The use of the Mosquito as a night fighter came about when the Air Ministry project for a night fighter (based on the Gloster F.9/37) was terminated so that Gloster could concentrate on jet aircraft development.

The first night fighter Mosquito introduced into service was the NF Mk II in mid-1942, with four 20 mm (.79 in) Hispano cannons in the fuselage belly and four .303 in (7.7 mm) Browning machine-guns mounted in the nose. It carried the Aircraft Interception radar (AI) Mk IV / Mk V when operating as a defensive night fighter over the UK, although at the time this was omitted from Mk IIs operating as night "Intruders", roaming over Europe at night to cause maximum disruption to lines of communications and flying operations. These were fitted with the Serrate radar detector to allow them to track down German night fighters by emissions from their own Lichtenstein B/C, C-1, or SN-2 radar, as well as a device codenamed Perfectos that tracked emissions from German IFF systems.

On 30 May 1942, the NF Mk II scored its first kill, a Dornier Do 217 of Kampfgeschwader 2. By the end of the war, Mosquito night fighters had claimed approximately six hundred piloted enemy aircraft (Unconfirmed), along with about the same number of pilotless V-1 flying bombs. Among this total were 68 single-engined Focke-Wulf Fw 190s. This variant also operated over Malta, Italy, Sicily and North Africa from late 1942 on. The Mosquito NF XII became the first aircraft to carry the highly effective centimetric radar.

Mosquito night fighters continued to operate over Europe until the end of the war with a low casualty rate, in spite of the efforts of the Heinkel He 219-equipped units and Messerschmitt 262 jet fighters which were flown at night by pilots from 10./NJG 11. The commander of this unit, Oberleutnant Kurt Welter, claimed perhaps 25 Mosquitos shot down by night and two further Mosquitos by day while flying the Me 262, adding to his previous seven Mosquito kills in high-performance Bf 109G-6/AS or Fw 190 A-8 fighters. From September 1944 through to May 1945 a total of 92 night-flying Mosquitos of all marks on bombing, target marking, intruder and night fighter operations were lost. As far as can be ascertained, three of the Me 262 claims over Mosquitos coincide with RAF records.

== Fighter-bomber operations ==
Media related to de Havilland Mosquito FB at Wikimedia Commons

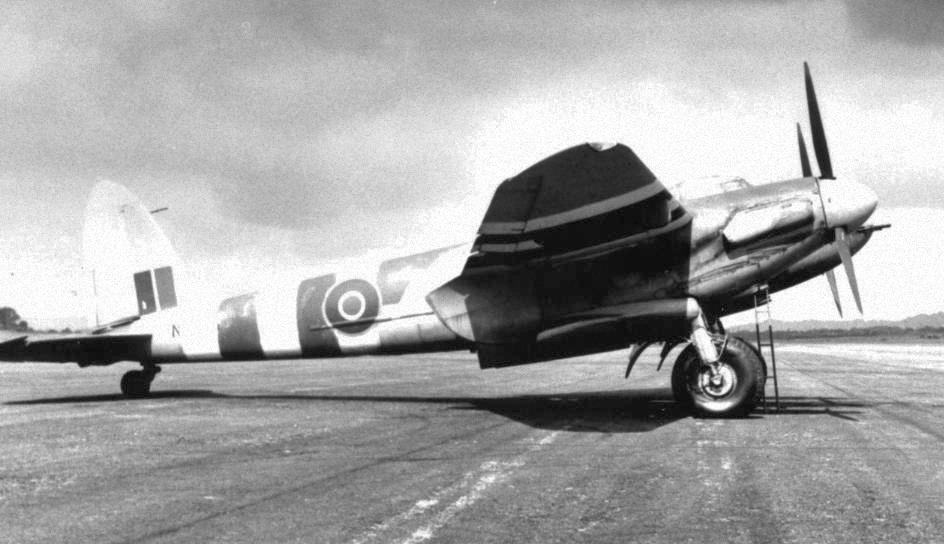
Mosquito FB.VI of 613 (City of Manchester) Squadron wearing 'D-Day stripes' at RAF Lasham in June 1944

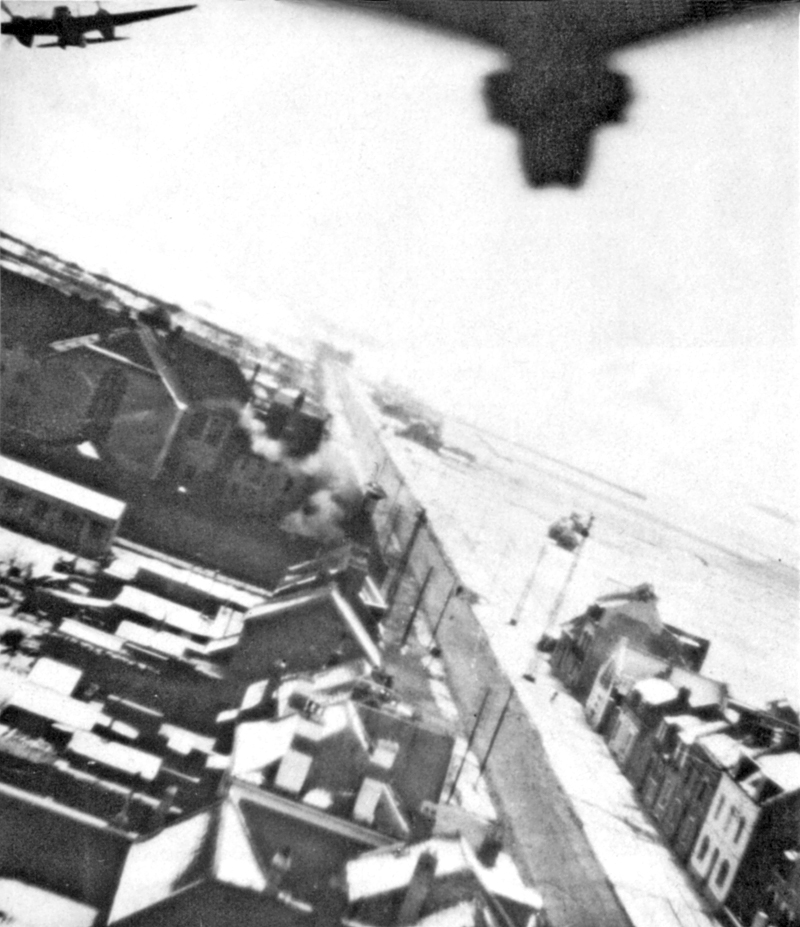
Operation Jericho — low-level aerial photo of Amiens Prison during the raid shows snow-covered buildings and landscape. The dark object at top right is the rear fuselage and incompletely retracted tailwheel of the photo Mosquito

Operational experience in its varied roles quickly led to the development of a versatile fighter-bomber version; the FB VI, which first saw service in early 1943. The Mark VI had a strengthened wing for external loads and along with its standard fighter armament could carry two 250 lb (110 kg) bombs in the rear of the bomb bay and two 250 lb (110 kg) bombs under the wings, or eight wing-mounted rockets. Later up-engined versions could carry 500 lb (230 kg) bombs. The FB VI became the most numerous version of the Mosquito (2,292 built), equipping the day bomber 2 Group, the intruder squadrons of Fighter Command and 2nd Tactical Air Force, and the strike wings of Coastal Command, who used the variant as a potent anti-shipping aircraft armed with eight "60 lb" rockets.

One of the higher-risk uses of the fighter-bomber Mosquito FB VI was by 21 Sqn., 464 (RAAF) Squadron and 487 (NZ) Squadron of No. 2 Group, 2nd Tactical Air Force in Operation Jericho, a mission to destroy the walls and guards' quarters of Amiens prison to allow members of the French Resistance to escape. In the aftermath of the operation the Mosquito of Group Captain Percy Pickard was shot down.

On 11 April 1944, after a request by Dutch resistance workers, six Mosquito FB VIs of No. 613 (City of Manchester) Squadron made a pinpoint daylight attack at rooftop height on the Kunstzaal Kleykamp Art Gallery in The Hague, Netherlands, which was being used by the Gestapo to store the Dutch Central Population Registry. The first two aircraft dropped high explosive bombs, to "open up" the building, their bombs going in through the doors and windows. The other crews then dropped incendiary bombs, and the records were destroyed. Only persons in the building were killed — nearby civilians in a bread queue were unharmed.

On 21 March 1945, a similar raid, Operation Carthage, again by 21 Sqn., 464(RAAF) Sqn. and 487(NZ) Sqn., involved a very low-level bombing attack on the Gestapo headquarters in Shell House (Shellhus), near the centre of Copenhagen, Denmark. The attack had been requested several times by members of the Danish resistance, but was initially deemed too dangerous by the RAF. Twenty Mosquitoes were involved, split into three attack waves. They were escorted by 30 RAF Mustangs. The main attack on the Gestapo headquarters caused the death of 55 German soldiers and 47 Danes working for the Gestapo, together with destruction of the Gestapo records in the headquarters. Eight Gestapo prisoners were killed while 18 prisoners escaped. A Mosquito flying in the first wave of the attack struck a tall lamp-post and crashed into a nearby Catholic school (the French school). Mosquitoes of the third wave bombed this area by mistake, killing 86 children, 10 nuns, 8 teachers, and 21 other civilians; no civilians had been killed during the main attack. Four Mosquitoes were lost and nine pilots/crew members died.

Following Operation Chastise (the famous "Dambusters raid"), Group Captain Leonard Cheshire, CO of RAF 617 squadron (Dambusters), developed a low-level dive-bombing method of target marking, expecting the main bombers to strike from a higher altitude. Initially he experimented with the squadron's Lancaster bombers, but then he wished to use Mosquitos for precision target marking by a Master Bomber.

== Photo reconnaissance units ==
Media related to De Havilland Mosquito PR at Wikimedia Commons

Although the RAF had continued to use aerial photography since the end of World War I, by 1939 it had become a very under-developed and neglected branch of the service. On the eve of World War II, Sidney Cotton took aerial photos during flights over parts of the Middle East, North Africa and even over German military airfields. Using a pair of Lockheed 12A's (Note: The Lockheed 12A was a widely used version of the Lockheed Model 12 Electra Junior q.v.) based at Heston, just north of London, Cotton undertook a further programme of photographic flights over Germany and Italy, with camera improvements such as a warm-air blown unit that overcame condensation problems. Two weeks after war was declared, Cotton's photographs of the Dutch coast were used finally to convince RAF senior officers of his capabilities. He was appointed as an honorary RAF Squadron Leader on 22 September 1939 and tasked to head up a new RAF 1 Photographic Development Unit at Heston Aerodrome. Cotton rapidly improved photo reconnaissance capabilities, working at first with a Bristol Blenheim (too slow), but soon acquiring a couple of Supermarine Spitfires that were rapidly adapted. (Note: The No. 1 Photographic Reconnaissance Unit RAF was the designation given to the first PRU on 14 November 1940 after several previous short-lived unit names for the RAF take-over from Cotton.)

Birtles gives the following reasons for the suitability of the Mosquito for PR operations: could carry more cameras than the Spitfire; long range combined with high speed; security of two engines; navigator could locate and identify targets whilst pilot concentrated on flying (and evasion when necessary). Later as more advanced variants were introduced, high altitude capability was added. On 13 July 1941, PR.1 W4051 LY-U was delivered to 1 PRU at RAF Benson. (Note: Benson was chosen once the decision had been taken to move from Hendon, since the former was close to RAF Medmenham where the photographic interpretation facility had been established.) Two more aircraft were delivered in July and August.

The first operational sortie by a PR Mk I of 1 PRU was flown in W4055 on 17 September 1941. During this flight reconnoitering the Biscay coasts of France, the pilot, Squadron Leader Clarke (Note: Some sources spell this surname Clerke.) evaded three Messerschmitt Bf 109s at 23,000 feet (7,000 m). In October, three PR Mosquitos were detached to RAF Wick to perform reconnaissance flights over Norway. Clarke flew back to Benson from Wick on 15 October in 1 hr. 32 m. - a record run. On 4 December, Sqn Ldr Alastair Taylor DFC with two bars and his navigator, Sgt. Sidney Horsfall, were lost in the Trondheim-Bergen area, becoming the first 1 PRU casualties. (Note: Horsfall)

Improved longer-range standard PR.Mk.I Mosquitos were introduced at 1 PRU, Benson, in early 1942. This enabled more distant reconnaissance missions, to Poland, for example. Also from around that date there were searches and photographic evidence, by the RAF Leuchars detachment, concerning the German Scharnhorst-class battleships. And on 16 January 1942 this unit had a further success when a round-trip flight to Murmansk located the hiding place in a Norwegian fjord of the Tirpitz. (Note: It was known from Enigma decrypts that the battleship had been moved from Wilhelmshaven to somewhere in Norway but previously poor weather conditions had prevented its location.)

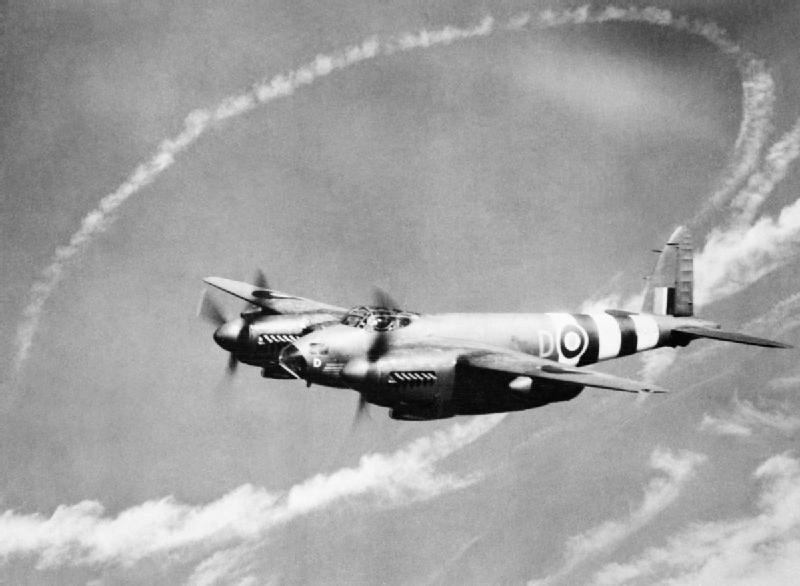
Mosquito PR Mark IX of 1409 (Meteorological) Flight RAF, November 1944

In 1942 Benson airfield was given new runways and No.1 PRU was expanded. Placed under RAF Coastal Command, (Note: The PRU's fell under the control of several different RAF Commands according to their types of operation.) there were five new squadron numbers, Nos. 540 to 544 inclusive. Of these, Sqns. 540 and 544 were the most significant for ongoing Mosquito PR operations.

In the spring of 1943 the No. 1409 Flight RAF (Meteorological Flight) was transferred to Bomber Command, and placed under No. 8 Group Pathfinder Force, based firstly at RAF Oakington. At that stage, it was using the PR Mark IX Mosquito but in 1944 it moved to RAF Wyton and received pressurised high altitude Mosquito PR XVIs. The crews, of which two were on constant standby, performed special reconnaissance duties. These included short-term on-the-spot meteorological reporting, containing photographs of weather conditions. Also, photographs of terrain and water features of topical intelligence significance.

The South African Air Force (SAAF) also served with distinction in PRU duties. In February 1943, 60 Squadron acquired their first Mosquito II's at the instigation of Field Marshal Bernard Montgomery whilst they were serving in North Africa. (Note: The squadron was flying Martin Baltimore III's but were short of serviceable aircraft. The two Mosquitos had been sent to Castel Benito airfield for "tropical exposure trials" but somebody made the proposal, agreed by Montgomery, that they could better be employed as PR aircraft.) In mid-July 1943, the first Mosquito PR Mk.IX arrived at the air base in Ariana, Tunisia. When 60 Squadron was detached to Derna in Libya in August, it flew a mission to Ploiești, Romania to photograph the results of the USAAF Operation Tidal Wave which took place on 1 August. Other missions to Ploiești were flown intermittently over the next few months from RAF Nicosia. In January 1944, the squadron was sent to USAAF San Severo in Italy. (Note: Some of these 60 Sqn. reconnaissance missions were defended by accompanying USAAF P38 Lightnings from the same base.) This move was to prepare for the southern European campaign; the squadron was equipped with Mosquito PR XVI's, with red and white rudder stripes. They carried out large-scale photographic surveys of parts of Sicily and other Axis held areas, eventually ranging over the Alps and deep into Austria and Germany, where they met with dangerous interceptions by Me 262 jets. (Note: Some SAAF pilots flew these missions together with RAF navigators who recounted some exploits. On 26 November 1944 an SAAF aircraft, NS649, was intercepted in the Salzburg - Innsbruck region and chased back over the Alps, flying to regain altitude with such difficulty that the engines were u.s. by the time they reached base.) On 4 April 1944 the Squadron obtained the first photographic evidence of Nazi genocides when an aircraft accidentally photographed Auschwitz concentration camp, intending to photograph the nearby Buna artificial rubber factory, also known as Monowitz concentration camp. When analysed, the photographs showed rows of people lined up, plus chimneys and all the other characteristics of a death camp. With the cessation of hostilities, 60 Squadron assisted the RAF in a photo survey of Greece before being withdrawn from operations on 22 August 1945 after it had returned to AFS Zwartkop, South Africa.

In 1945, an RAF PR Mk XVI Mosquito of Eastern Air Command operating out of airfields in Burma set a twin-engine record on a single photo-reconnaissance mission covering 2,400 mi (3,900 km) in 8 hours and 50 minutes.

The PR Mk 34 was the final wartime photo reconnaissance version of the Mosquito, designed for long range reconnaissance in the Pacific. To increase its range it had no armor and its bulged bomb bay had a fuel tank, giving an internal fuel capacity of 1,192 gallons plus two 200 gallon drop tanks when required. Power was by two 1,635 hp Merlin 25's. With a full fuel load its range was 3,600 miles at a speed of 300 mph. It could reach 425 mph (684 km/h), placing it among the fastest piston-engined aircraft of World War II. Tested in Britain in April–May 1945, it was then flown to India, establishing a new record time for the flight. Before the Japanese surrender, it conducted 38 sorties from the Cocos Islands, reaching destinations such as Sumatra and Malaya (Malaysia).

The United States Army Air Forces (USAAF) ordered 120 Mosquitos for photographic reconnaissance, but only 40 were delivered and given the U.S. designation F-8. These were built in Canada. There were six B Mk VII's and 34 B Mk XX's. Only 16 of these reached Europe, where 11 were turned over to the RAF and five were sent to Italy. The RAF also provided 145 Hatfield-built PR Mk XVI aircraft to the Eighth Air Force between February 1944 and the end of the war. These were used for a variety of photographic and night reconnaissance missions and also for covert operations.

== USAAF ==
Media related to De Havilland Mosquito in USAAF service at Wikimedia Commons

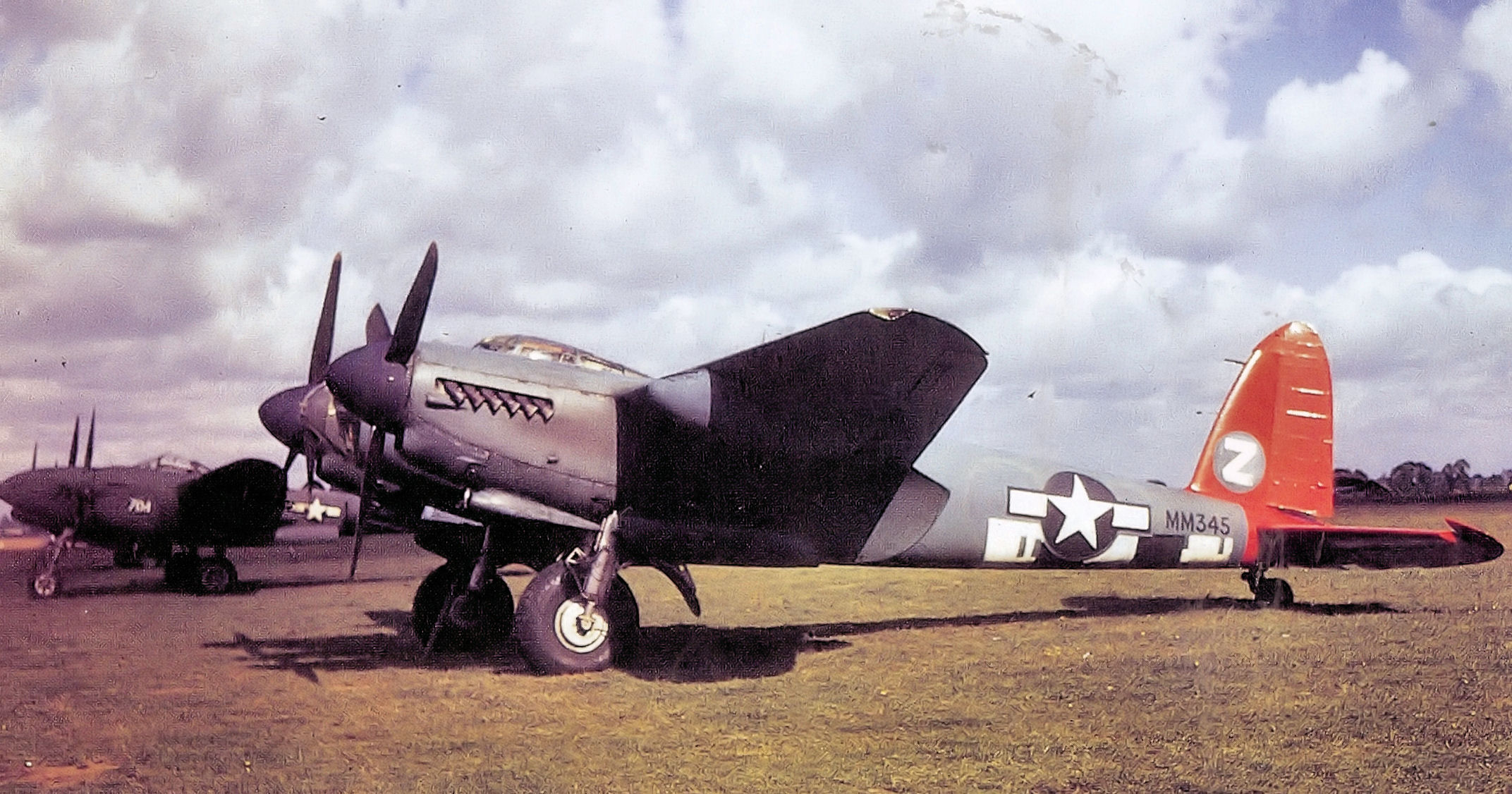
A Mosquito PR Mk XVI "Z" MM345 of the 653rd Weather Reconnaissance Squadron, 25th Bombardment Group at RAF Watton, England. This Hatfield-built aircraft was delivered in May 1944.

The USAAF 25th Bombardment Group (Reconnaissance) was constituted in the days after D-Day and activated at RAF Watton in August 1944 to carry out photographic and mapping missions over mainland Europe, as the Allied armies pushed east. In addition to photo-reconnaissance missions both for weather forecasting and for target identifications, they employed their PR Mk XVI Mosquitos as Chaff (countermeasure) dispensers and as scouts for the heavy bomber force. They also undertook "[Joan-Eleanor Project]" OSS missions using an air-to-ground radio system known as Joan-Eleanor system. This required modifications to the rear fuselage to accommodate an intelligence service linguist to talk to agents on the ground through a VHF radio. (Note: The OSS Joan-Eleanor project development began with the 25 BG Rcn at Watton in September 1944. HQ 8th AF forced OSS project transfer to 492nd BG, Harrington in March 1945. This history is detailed in Joan-Eleanor Log, RG226, National Archives II. College Park, MD. The JE project at Harrington resulted in a feud by OSS project personnel against the 492nd BG. The JE Log details claims of 492 BG incompetence involving Mosquito and A-26 maintenance and JE operations.)

Additionally, some aircraft were used as H2X Mickey platforms.

The 25th BG flew 3,246 sorties (including B-17, B-24, B-25, B-26, A-26 and Mosquito flights) and lost 29 PR Mk XVIs on operations (including takeoff accidents).

During the latter part of the war, the 416th NFS in Italy used Mosquito NF.30s claiming one kill.

== Neutral country flights and BOAC service ==
Media related to De Havilland Mosquito in BOAC service at Wikimedia Commons

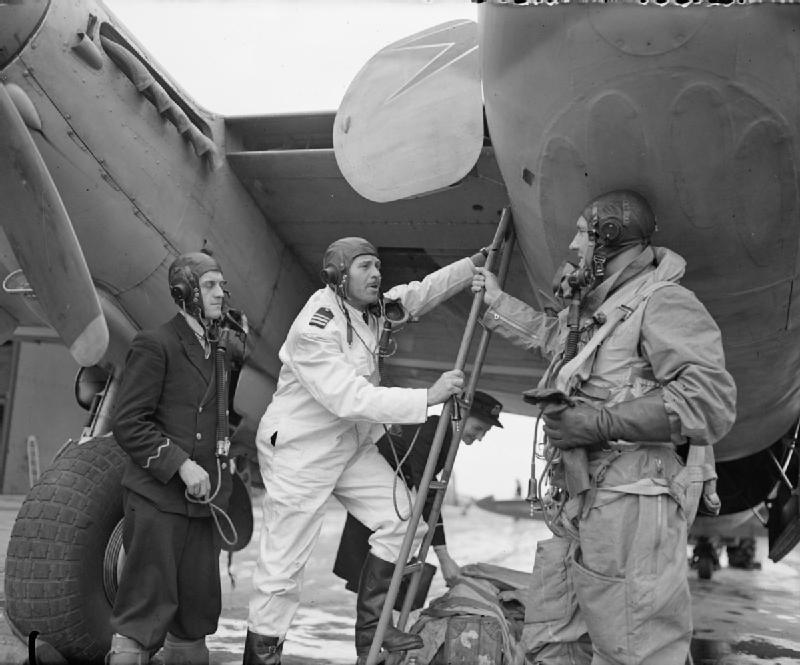
A passenger (right), who has been carried in the bomb-bay of a 'civilianised' De Havilland Mosquito FB VI of BOAC on the fast freight service from Stockholm, Sweden, with Captain Wilkins and his navigator on arrival at Leuchars, Scotland.

Between 1943 and the end of the war, Mosquitos were used as transport aircraft on a regular route over the North Sea between Leuchars in Scotland and Stockholm, in neutral Sweden. Earlier, Lockheed Hudsons and Lodestars were used but these slower aircraft could only fly this route at night or in bad weather to avoid the risk of being shot down. During the long daylight hours of the Northern summer, the Mosquito was the safer alternative.

To ensure that the flights did not violate Sweden's neutrality, the aircraft carried civilian markings and were operated by crews who were nominally "civilian employees" of British Overseas Airways Corporation (BOAC). They carried small, high value cargoes such as precision ball bearings and machine-tool steel, as well as Diplomatic Bags. Important passengers were also carried in an improvised "cabin" in the bomb bay. One such notable passenger was the physicist Niels Bohr, who was evacuated from Stockholm in 1943 in order to join the British Mission on the Manhattan Project. The flight almost ended in tragedy since Bohr did not don his oxygen equipment as instructed, and passed out. He would have died had not the pilot, surmising from Bohr's lack of response to intercom communication that he had lost consciousness, descended to a lower altitude for the remainder of the flight. Bohr's comment was that he had slept like a baby for the entire flight.

== In USSR ==
Mosquitos acted in the USSR on reconnaissance duties operating from Soviet bases on the Kola peninsula to monitor Luftwaffe activities in Norway. The Soviets also made a request to acquire a Mosquito, so B.IV (DK296) was tested, but reports noted that it demanded high flying skills and no further purchases were made.

A courier mail link between the Soviet and British governments, sometimes transporting VIP passengers was also maintained. Late in WWII, Mosquitos undertook a wide range of courier duties, often overflying and sometimes landing in neutral countries such as Sweden. In 1944, a Mosquito from RAF Benson was stripped of its photographic equipment and flew to Moscow in 4 hours, acting as a courier for the Moscow Conference (1944). As a result, Mosquitos from RAF Benson were given the further tasks of carrying diplomatic mail for the Yalta Conference and the Potsdam Conference, both in 1945.

== Post-World War II ==
Mosquitos flying with the Israeli Air Force saw action during the 1956 Suez Crisis. Although, at the time, the Mosquito was being taken out of service, 13 aircraft of various marks were taken out of storage. An additional 13 TR.33 ex-Fleet Air Arm Mosquitos were purchased from a British scrap dealer in 1954 and delivered via Blackbushe Airport in early 1955. The Dominican Air Force obtained five ex-RAF FB.6s in 1948.

Sweden purchased 60 ex-RAF Mk XIX Mosquitos in 1948 to be used as a night fighter under the J 30 designation. The aircraft were assigned to the Västmanland Wing (F 1), thereby becoming the first (and only) dedicated night fighter unit of the Swedish Air Force. Its Mosquitos were replaced by jet fighters, de Havilland Venom Mk 51s (designated J 33), in 1953. One-third of the J 30s crashed or broke down during service, mainly due to rudder problems. Swedish Air Force General Björn Bjuggren wrote in his memoirs that mechanical problems in the swivelling nose-mounted radar antenna caused destructive vibrations that broke apart one or two J 30s in the air.

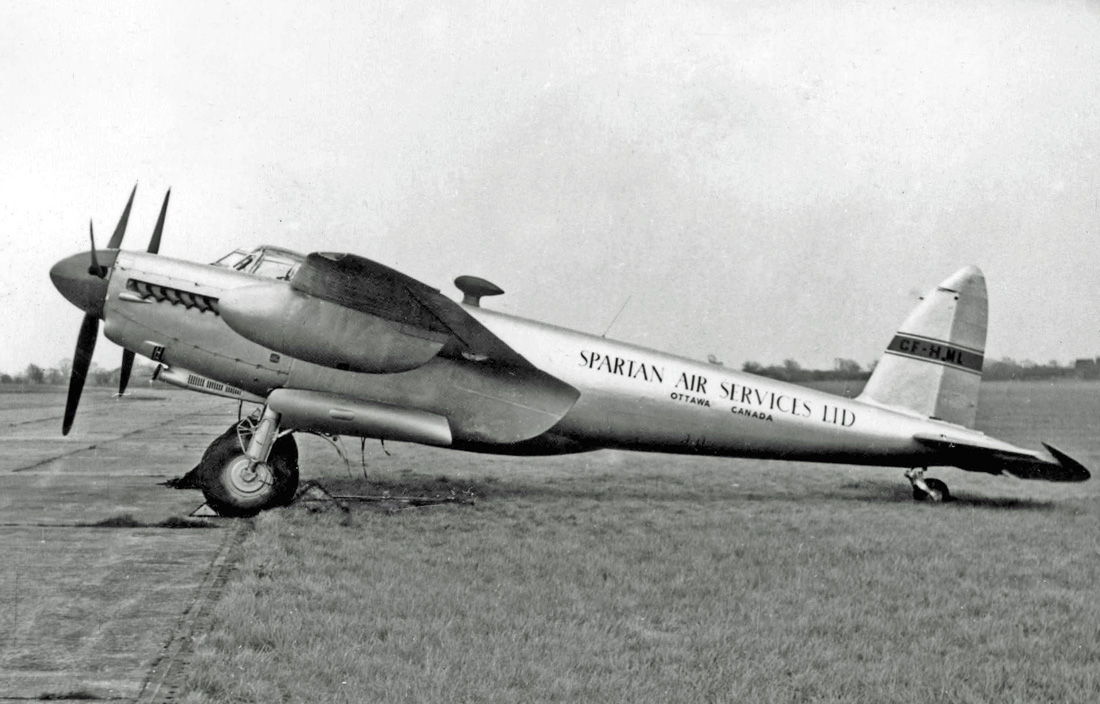
Mosquito B.35 of Spartan Air Services, Ottawa, Ontario, Canada after modification in 1955 for high-altitude surveys

The Belgian Air Force operated 24 Mosquito NF 30s between 1949 and 1956. They were flown by 10 Smaldeel of 1 Wing based at Beauvechain Air Base until they were replaced in the night fighter role by Gloster Meteor NF 11s. MB-24 survives on display in the aviation museum in Brussels. In 1954, the Belgian Air Force also received three Mosquito FB 6s which had been converted to the target tug role.

Some 150 to 200+ (sources differ) Canadian-built Mosquitos and spare engines were purchased by the Republic of China Air Force in 1947. Considerable numbers of these aircraft saw combat in 1947–1949 during the civil war against Communist forces. Some defected to the Communists and fought against Nationalists. Two participated in the Proclamation of the People's Republic of China Parade of Oct 1st 1949.

Spartan Air Services of Ottawa Ontario acquired twelve ex-RAF Mosquito B.35s in 1955. These were modified by Derby Aviation at Derby (Burnaston) Airport for high altitude aerial survey. After ferrying over the Atlantic, they operated commercially throughout the Americas until the mid-1960s.

== Notable pilots ==
In alphabetical order of surname, some notable Mosquito pilots were:-

- Air Vice Marshal Robert Bateson CB, DSO & Bar, DFC (10 June 1912 – 6 March 1986) – During WWII he flew low-level raids against precision targets in occupied Europe. Born in Watford; attended the local grammar school. Joined RAF in July 1936 on a short service commission. First active service in No. 113 Squadron RAF, flying the Hawker Hind. In the Middle East, converted to the Bristol Blenheim; then commanded No. 211 Squadron RAF in the Far East. From February 1944, commanded No. 613 (City of Manchester) Squadron RAF, with Mosquito FB.VI's. One of several squadrons in No. 2 Group RAF that made low-level precision attacks. These included Gestapo Headquarters in The Hague, Central Records Registry, 11 April 1944; Copenhagen Operation Carthage, 'Shell House', 21 March 1945; Odense, Fyn, Denmark, 17 April 1945. Awarded a bar to his DSO for leading these attacks, the citation includes the words: - the highest standard of skill as the target was small and well defended... the attack was pressed home with a determination and accuracy which ensured success. (Also) In April, 1945 (Odense attack) ... In spite of opposition from the ground defences the attack was vigorously and accurately pressed home... brilliant leadership ... played an important part in the success of these notable sorties. Post-war he became a senior RAF officer and on retirement he had held a total of seven commands.
- Don Bennett- Air Vice Marshal Donald Clifford Tyndall Bennett, CB, CBE, DSO. Began flying as a cadet in the Royal Australian Air Force, 16 July 1930. Short-service commission in the Royal Air Force 11 August 1931. From July 1940 flying superintendent, Atlantic Ferry service. Re-joined RAF on 25 September 1941 - acting Wing Commander. Promoted 1943 with upgrading of PFF to Group status - Air Commodore, then in December to acting Air Vice Marshal — the youngest ever to hold that rank. In July 1942, acting Group Captain Bennett was directed by Air Marshal Sir Arthur Harris to command the Pathfinder Force (PFF), Bomber Command. Previously only one in three of the heavy bombers was attaining strikes within five miles (8 km) of the target yet loss rates were appalling. Guiding main formations using radar and pyrotechnics, PFF greatly improved the accuracy and effectiveness. Bennett saw the potential of the underestimated Mosquito, and it was used in relatively small numbers in each raid as the leading aircraft flight. By May 1945 Bennett had eleven Mosquito squadrons doing this work and frequently, against regulations, he would fly one himself to observe the marking of targets during the attacks.
- Bob Braham, DSO & Two Bars, DFC & Two Bars, AFC, CD – The most decorated RAF fighter pilot of the Second World War and a top night fighter ace.
- Air Marshal Sir Ivor Broom, KCB, CBE, DSO, AFC - He flew three tours of bomber operations, gaining the DSO for leading Mosquito raids over Berlin. First operations were in Bristol Blenheims. In 1941, flew from besieged Malta on shipping sweeps. In May 1943, became an instructor in No. 1655 Mosquito Training Unit, training No. 8 Pathfinder Group pilots. In May 1944 joined No. 571 Squadron, flying Mosquito XVI's in the Light Night Striking Force. His navigator was Flt. Lt. Tommy Broom and the pair were nicknamed "the flying brooms," with an emblem of crossed broomsticks on their aircraft. They carried 4000 lb "cookies" in numerous raids over Berlin (the "milk run"!). In autumn 1944, became acting Squadron Leader in No. 128 LNSF Mosquito squadron. In January 1945 made acting Wing Commander and C.O. of No. 163 LNSF squadron, Tommy Broom joining him as squadron navigation officer. At end of WWII, still aged only 24, had done 58 operational missions in Mosquitos, including 22 over Berlin; 103 operational sorties in total. Continued a distinguished RAF career until 1977.
- Eric "Winkle" Brown, CBE, DSC, AFC, Hon FRAeS, RN – Test pilot credited in the Guinness Book of Records as having flown 487 - the greatest number - of aircraft types in the world; performed deck landing trials of the Sea Mosquito, the heaviest aircraft yet flown from a British carrier. On 25 March 1944 he put it down on HMS Indefatigable. Previously, British carrier aircraft had only been single-engine and generally only about half the weight.
- Branse Burbridge, DSO & Bar, DFC & Bar – The RAF's highest scoring Mosquito night fighter ace, mainly achieved whilst in No. 85 Squadron.
- Leonard Cheshire, VC, OM, DSO**, DFC - Group Captain. As a Pathfinder flying RAF Lancasters, Cheshire requested and was given a Mosquito for personal use to perfect novel Pathfinding techniques whilst serving as 617 Squadron commander. (In 617 he had succeeded Guy Gibson); His 1944 VC cited his dive over Munich in a Mosquito, enduring "withering" fire for many minutes. The youngest Group Captain in the RAF at the time; a distinguished exponent of Pathfinder precision marking. From 1948, Cheshire devoted his life to the care of the disabled and terminally ill, founding the Cheshire Homes. In 1991 Cheshire was created a life peer.
- Sidney Cotton – Australian civilian photographic reconnaissance pioneer. Set up a PR unit at RAF Heston, London, flying the Lockheed 12a. Was given an officer rank by RAF, but became too unruly and left. Cotton also developed the flying suit bearing his name.
- John Cunningham (RAF officer) (Final Rank Group Captain), CBE, DSO & Two Bars, DFC & Bar, AE – John Cunningham tested the prototype W4050 on 9 February 1941 and was "greatly impressed by the lightness of the controls and generally pleasant handling characteristics". He travelled to Canada and onwards to Australia to set up the DH Mosquito works. Commanding No. 85 Squadron RAF, he became a night fighter ace on several variants of Mosquito Night Fighter, including the pressurised H.A. type. On 9 June 1944 he took off from RAF Uxbridge and overflew the British sector of Normandy in the DH Vampire (fuselage pod a timber sandwich shell like the Mosquito). On 1 December 1945 he resumed work as a Senior Test pilot for DH, flying types including the DH Vampire and the Comet jet airliner.
- Geoffrey de Havilland Jr, – Son of the founder of DH and chief test pilot of the firm, flew the maiden flight of the Mosquito and that of the DH Vampire. Died on 27 September 1946 whilst carrying out high speed tests in the DH 108 TG306 which broke up over the Thames estuary.
- Bill Edrich DFC – Squadron Leader. English international cricketer, who played against Miller. Graduated from Blenheims to Mosquitos.
- Hughie Edwards (Final Rank, Honour and Decorations: Air Commodore Sir Hughie Idwal Edwards, VC, KCMG, CB, DSO, OBE, DFC (1 August 1914 – 5 August 1982) From 1 August 1942, (then) Wing Commander Hughie Edwards re-convened No. 105 Squadron RAF - the first squadron of Mosquito Mk.IV bombers. Edwards had won a Victoria Cross in July 1941. (Note: On 4 July 1941, in a Blenheim Mk.IV, Edwards had led a daylight attack on the Port of Bremen by No. 2 Group RAF machines. He won the Victoria Cross for this, becoming the most highly decorated Australian serviceman in the war. Twelve Blenheims attacked through telephone and high voltage power lines. Facing fierce anti-aircraft fire and barrage balloons, flak soon downed four aircraft but Edwards brought the remainder home - his own Blenheim hit over 20 times. Citations for facts concerning Edwards are in his Wikipedia page or links therefrom.) Leading No. 105 Mosquito Squadron, on 6 December 1942, Edwards directed Mosquitos, Douglas Bostons and Lockheed Venturas in 'Operation Oyster', the daylight low-level raid on the Philips electrical works at Eindhoven. Fourteen aircraft were downed, and the factory was substantially damaged. Civilian casualties were reduced by operating on a Sunday. Whilst leading 105 Squadron Mosquitos, he also flew the first daylight attack on Berlin.
- Air Chief Marshal Sir Christopher Neil Foxley-Norris GCB, DSO, OBE, FRSA Commissioned RAFVR December 1938. Flew all through WWII - Battle of France Army Co-operation, No. 13 Squadron RAF, Westland Lysanders; Battle of Britain three Hurricane squadrons—Nos. 111, 3, and 615 (County of Surrey); flying instructor in England and Canada; returned UK June 1943, subsequently on Beaufighter and Mosquito F.B. low-level anti-shipping operations at bases including RAF North Coates and RAF St. Eval. After brief spell in Middle East, appointed Acting Wing Commander No. 143 Squadron RAF - part of the RAF Banff Strike Wing. Flying Mosquito FB VI's armed with RP's, they successfully attacked U Boats and surface shipping. His DSO citation says he "operated against a wide range of enemy targets ... by his brilliant leadership, exceptional skill and determination ... contributed in good measure to the successes obtained." Post-war, permanently commissioned and served in Singapore; Fighter Command (whilst still flying Javelins), Commander-in-Chief RAF Germany in the late 1960s and a series of other senior appointments, becoming Air Chief Marshall.
- Guy Gibson, VC, DSO and Bar - after leading Operation Chastise, he then went on a tour of Canada and the United States. Following that, he then flew in Mosquitoes, despite not having completed the course with his navigator, Jim Warwick, who was on a mosquito for the first time. Although an incredible skilled pilot who did not doubt his ability, the Mosquito was a very different machine to the Lancaster. Theories on how he died vary, some still believe that Gibson's Mosquito simply ran out of fuel or that it had a faulty fuel gauge on board which gave misleading readings. Bernard McCormack, however, clearly believed that it was the 600 rounds he fired at the 'Junkers Ju 88' that brought down the aircraft that he was later told was Gibson's Mosquito.
- Kerkorian, Kirk – Ferry pilot for Mosquitos from Canada to Britain and elsewhere during World War II. The North Atlantic route was dangerous; the pay was high — $1000 per trip. A section of the Las Vegas Review-Journal book, The Top 100, citing a 1974 biography by Dial Torgerson Kerkorian, An American Success Story.
- Keith Miller RAAF – Australian international cricketer, regarded by many as the greatest Australian all-rounder. In later life when asked how he dealt with pressure on the cricket field, Miller replied: "Pressure is a Messerschmitt up your arse, playing cricket is not."
- Bolesław Orliński DFC – famous Polish pilot who flew a Breguet 19 from Warsaw-Tokyo-Warsaw in 1926 and, with a PZL P.24, set a speed record on 28 June 1934. Commanding officer of Polish 305 Squadron, he flew a Mosquito in a mission against German prison camp in Lille and a large German fuel dump at Nomexy.
- Wing Commander D. A. G. ("George") Parry RAFVR DSO, MBE, DFC, AE - A pioneer in introducing the very first Mosquito Mk.IV bombers in service, in RAF No. 105 Squadron. He was called up from RAFVR (London, 1938) at the onset of war, and sent to 10 FTS, then 13 OTU (RAF Bicester) as a trainee Blenheim Mk.IV pilot. His first operational squadron was No. 110, at RAF Wattisham, flying Blenheim Mk.IV's. (Note: This squadron, named "Hyderabad," had been the first to raid Germany in WWII, bombing enemy warships near Wilhelmshaven.) Flying mainly by daylight, their targets included Channel ports, waterways and Axis airfields. Parry's first combat tour ended on 13 October 1940 and he was posted back to 13 OTU, Bicester, to train Blenheim pilots. But in October 1941 he was invited to re-join active operations in No. 105 Squadron, Swanton Morley, where the new Mosquito Mk.IV bombers were arriving.
- Percy Charles Pickard DSO and 2 bars, DFC – English Group Captain who starred in film Target for Tonight early in the war. Later became Group Captain and was shot down and killed during Operation Jericho, the raid on Amiens Prison.
- Erik Hazelhoff Roelfzema RMWO, DFC – A Dutch resistance fighter, secret agent and RAF pilot. Became adjudant (assistant) to Queen Wilhelmina. Made Knight 4th class of the Military William Order. Flew 72 sorties for No. 139 Squadron RAF and wrote "Soldier of Orange".
- Kenneth Wolstenholme – Flight Lieutenant in No. 105 Squadron RAF. He later became the presenter and commentator on the BBC Match of the Day football programme. Spoke the widely repeated words "some people are on the pitch ... they think it's all over... it is now" as Geoff Hurst scored the fourth goal in England's 4-2 World Cup Final win over West Germany in 1966.
- John Wooldridge DSO, DFC and Bar, DFM – Born in Yokohama, Japan. Nicknamed "Dim". Flew 97 Bomber Command missions. Led No. 105 Squadron. Wrote "Low Attack." Composer of film music. Studied under Sibelius and was a contemporary of William Walton. Died in car crash 27 Oct 1958 and is buried in St. Lawrence's churchyard, Cholesbury, Bucks.
- Yeates, Flt Lt Gerald DFC & Bar - "Harvested" a German ship's mast in the nose of his Mosquito during raid on shipping in the Kattegat. Pressed home the attack and with flak damage to tail, flew home 400 miles with irreparable damage.
