= Circus offensive =

Codename given to operations by the RAF during World War II

Circus was the codename given to operations by the Royal Air Force (RAF) during the Second World War where bombers, with a mass escort of fighters, were sent over continental Europe to bring Luftwaffe fighters into combat. These were usually formations of 20 to 30 bombers escorted by up to 16 squadrons of escort fighters. Bomber formations of this size could not be ignored by the Luftwaffe.

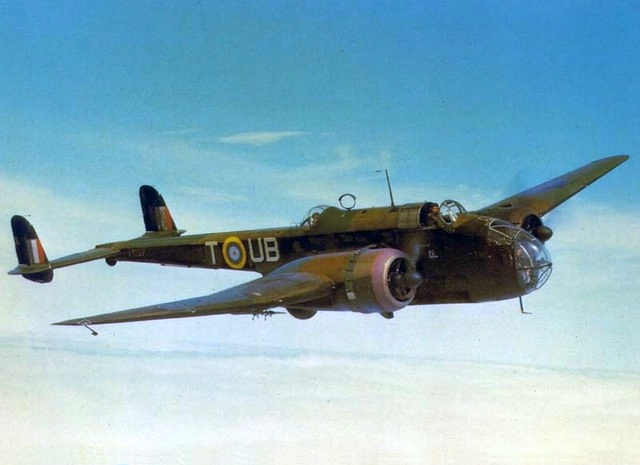
Handley Page Hampden

At first medium bombers such as the Handley Page Hampden were used but even with many escorts they were too vulnerable to flak and German fighters. The Hampdens were replaced with Bristol Blenheim light bombers but those fared no better. Heavy bombers such as the Short Stirling were easier to escort but after several missions Bomber Command needed them back.

The "Hurribomber", a fighter-bomber development of the Hawker Hurricane, was used with better results, although the small bomb load carried by this aircraft caused little damage.

There were other codenames for similar missions.

- Ramrod: similar to Circus but with destroying a target being the principal aim. An example would be Operation Ramrod 16.
- Ranger: large fighter formation intrusion over occupied territory with aim of wearing down German fighter force.
- Rhubarb: small-scale freelance fighter sorties against ground targets of opportunity.
- Roadstead: low-level attack on coastal shipping.

== History ==
Following the end of the Battle of Britain RAF Fighter Command moved from defensive to offensive operations where they would engage German fighters on the other side of the Channel; the operational instructions were ready by December 1940. This was a result of the replacement of Hugh Dowding by the more aggressive Sholto Douglas as Air Officer Commanding-in-Chief of RAF Fighter Command. Douglas described his policy as "leaning forward into France" and it was enthusiastically supported by Trafford Leigh-Mallory who had replaced Keith Park as head of No. 11 Group RAF, whose command covered the South East of England.

There would be two types of offensive operation: "Rhubarb" (initially called Mosquito), in which small patrols would cross under cover of cloudy conditions and engage any aircraft they found; and on clear weather days "Circus", in which several squadrons - possibly with a few bombers - would conduct sweeps of northern France. Circus came to mean an operation with bombers.

The first circus offensive was on 11 January 1941 against Guînes with 114 Sqn of Blenheims, with nine squadrons of fighters.

Rhubarb patrols began by 66 Sqn on 20 December 1940, with two Spitfires over Le Touquet. While the pilots were allowed to attack ground targets if any presented itself, their primary objective was to bring down German aircraft. By mid-June 1941, Fighter Command had flown 149 Rhubarb patrols (336 sorties) claiming seven enemy aircraft brought down for loss of eight pilots on the British side. Circus operations with bombers began in January and eleven had been carried out by June, the targets including docks on the French coast and airfields. More than forty sweeps without bombers had been made in the same period. While Fighter Command's priority was the German fighters, Bomber Command concentrated on destroying the ground targets. At higher levels in the RAF it was felt that the effects on the war by damage that could be inflicted by the bombers would be minimal; the commanders of Bomber and Fighter Commands held a conference in which it was agreed that the purpose of a Circus was to force German fighters into combat in circumstances that favoured the British and to that end the bombers had to do enough damage that the Luftwaffe could not ignore the attacks.

Prior to Operation Barbarossa, the German invasion of the USSR, Air Chief Marshal Sir Charles Portal the Chief of the Air Staff directed Fighter and Bomber Commands to find a way to keep German fighters in western Europe rather than reinforce the Luftwaffe in eastern Europe. The resulting policy was to conduct Circus operations against industrial targets in the region of Bethune, Lille in north-east France; this might draw German fighter defences towards the area leaving the defences on the flanks weaker for unescorted bombers to make daylight attacks on Germany. At the same time night bombing operations would be made against the Ruhr industrial region. The Air Ministry directed the RAF that the purpose of Circuses would be destruction of the ground targets with German fighters as secondary priority. It soon became clear that unescorted daylight bombing was too risky and heavy bombers should be used on night operations only. (Note: The Short Stirling were used in Circus operations for a brief period; a formation of a few heavies being easier to manage than several light bombers such as the Bristol Blenheim.) Over six weeks RAF Fighter Command flew 8,000 sorties in support of 376 bomber sorties and a further 800 sorties on sweeps. (Note: Fighter Command also made around 10,000 defensive sorties and 1,000 sorties supporting attacks on German ships in this period.) In August, Circuses were flown with 2 Group and 5 Group, Bomber Command.

Fighter Command was losing pilots and aircraft on operations over Europe, but Douglas claimed that losses were lighter than during the Battle of Britain and aircraft losses were replaceable. In fact, the losses were actually higher and the results disappointing. During 1941, Fighter Command claimed to have destroyed 800 enemy aircraft for the loss of 462 fighter pilots; however, the actual number of German aircraft destroyed was only 183. Included in the lost RAF aircrew, killed or captured, were some of their most experienced officers; thirty flight lieutenants, twenty squadron leaders, six wing commanders and one group captain. Amongst them were some of the Fighter Command's most vaunted aces; Eric Lock killed in the Channel, Douglas Bader captured in northern France and Paddy Finucane killed in the Pas de Calais. Fighter Command found in 1941 that it was experiencing in the offensive all the same disadvantages that the Luftwaffe had experienced in 1940; operating at the limits of their range and over enemy territory so that shot-down pilots were captured rather than being able to rejoin their squadrons. Additionally the German commanders were free to choose which raids to challenge and which to ignore, since the bomber forces deployed by the RAF were rarely large enough to inflict critical damage.

Besides the poor loss ratio of more than two British aircraft to one German, another stated aim of the campaign from the summer of 1941 was to divert Luftwaffe air assets away from Operation Barbarossa, the Axis invasion of the Soviet Union. Although a number of experienced German pilots were transferred back to France, no major units were withdrawn from the Eastern Front and the two fighter Geschwader in the Western Europe, Jagdgeschwader 2 and Jagdgeschwader 26, had returned to full strength by November 1941. On a broader view, the campaign kept 75 fighter squadrons equipped with the most modern aircraft in the United Kingdom, compared to a total of 34 fighter squadrons in the Middle and Far East theatres. Furthermore, Spitfires were not transferred to overseas commands and the Hurricanes supplied were of older models. The situation was worse in the Far East, where the RAF had to meet the Japanese invasion of Malaya equipped with the obsolescent Brewster Buffalo, an American fighter deemed unfit for service in Europe. The campaign failed in its objectives and wasted resources that were badly needed elsewhere; the Germans referred to it as the "nonsense offensive".

== See also ==
- Royal Air Force daylight raids, 1940–1944
- Siren Tour, night-time raid, towards the end of the war
