= Victoria Terrasse =

Historic building complex in Oslo, Norway

Coordinates: 59°54′51″N 10°43′43″E

Victoria Terrasse is a historic building complex located in central Oslo, Norway. The complex now houses the Norwegian Ministry of Foreign Affairs.

== History ==
Victoria Terrasse was built between 1884 and 1890 as an apartment complex. It was designed by architect Henrik Thrap-Meyer, assisted by Paul Due and Bernhard Steckmest. An early design for the project by Wilhelm von Hanno dates back to 1876. It consisted of three quarters and provided a fashionable residential complex. The complex's features included rich profiling and a wide variety of wrought iron detail. The building complex utilized electric power and had the largest apartments along the main facade. The facades are articulated with relatively deeply profiled horizontal bands that mark the two main floors. The exterior is made of polished tiled brick painted white, enhanced by decorative towers, domes and cupolas.

From 1891 to 1895, Henrik Ibsen lived on the first floor of the southern quarter. It was taken over by the Norwegian government in 1913 and put to use by the police and various political departments.

The building was taken over by the Sicherheitspolizei and Sicherheitsdienst in April 1940, serving as headquarters during the Occupation of Norway by Nazi Germany. The offices held the interrogation centre for all prisoners in Oslo. Allied bombers tried to destroy Victoria Terrasse on 25 September 1942 and 31 December 1944 but missed the complex and instead hit civilian targets.

== Gallery ==
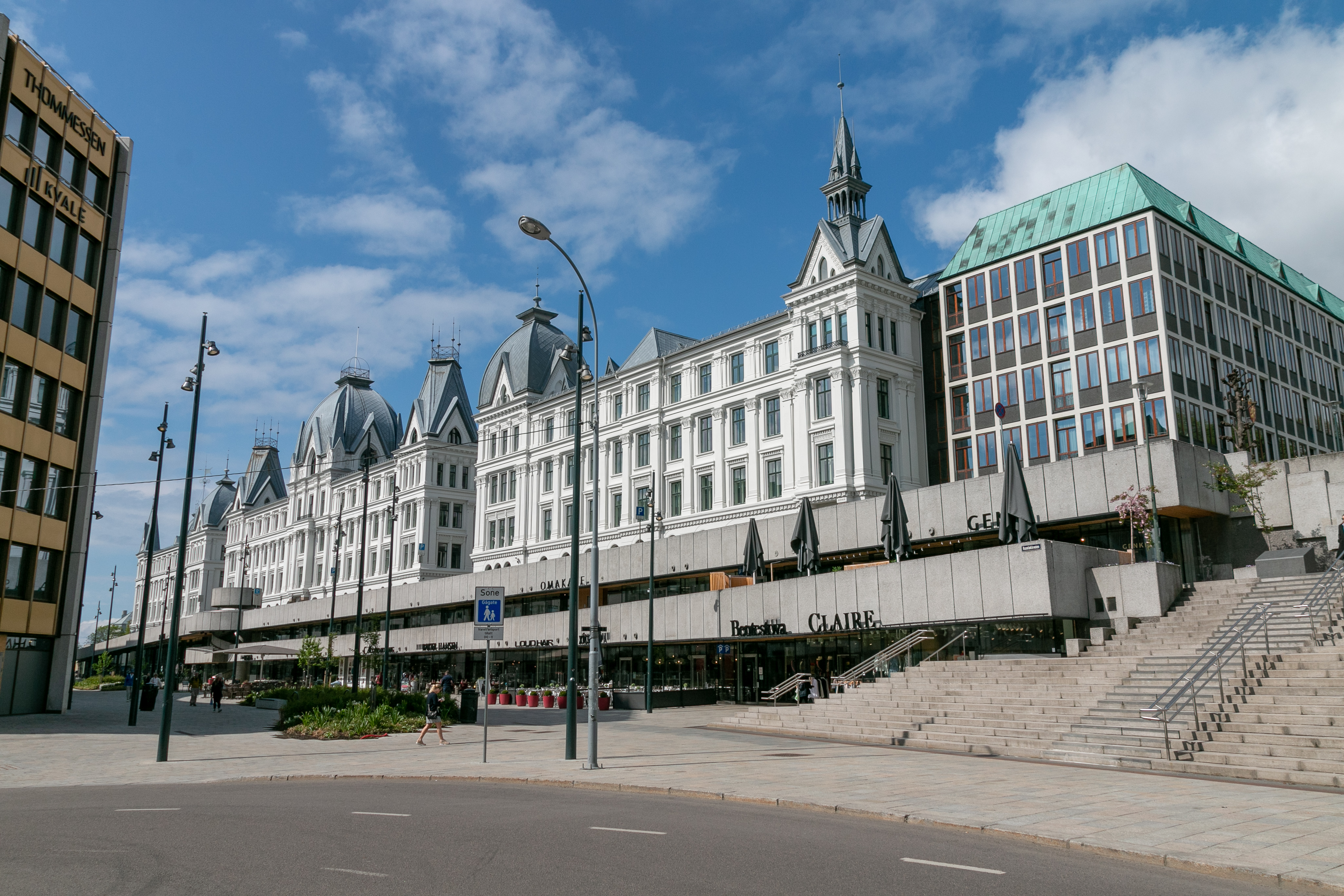
Victoria Terrasse, May 2018

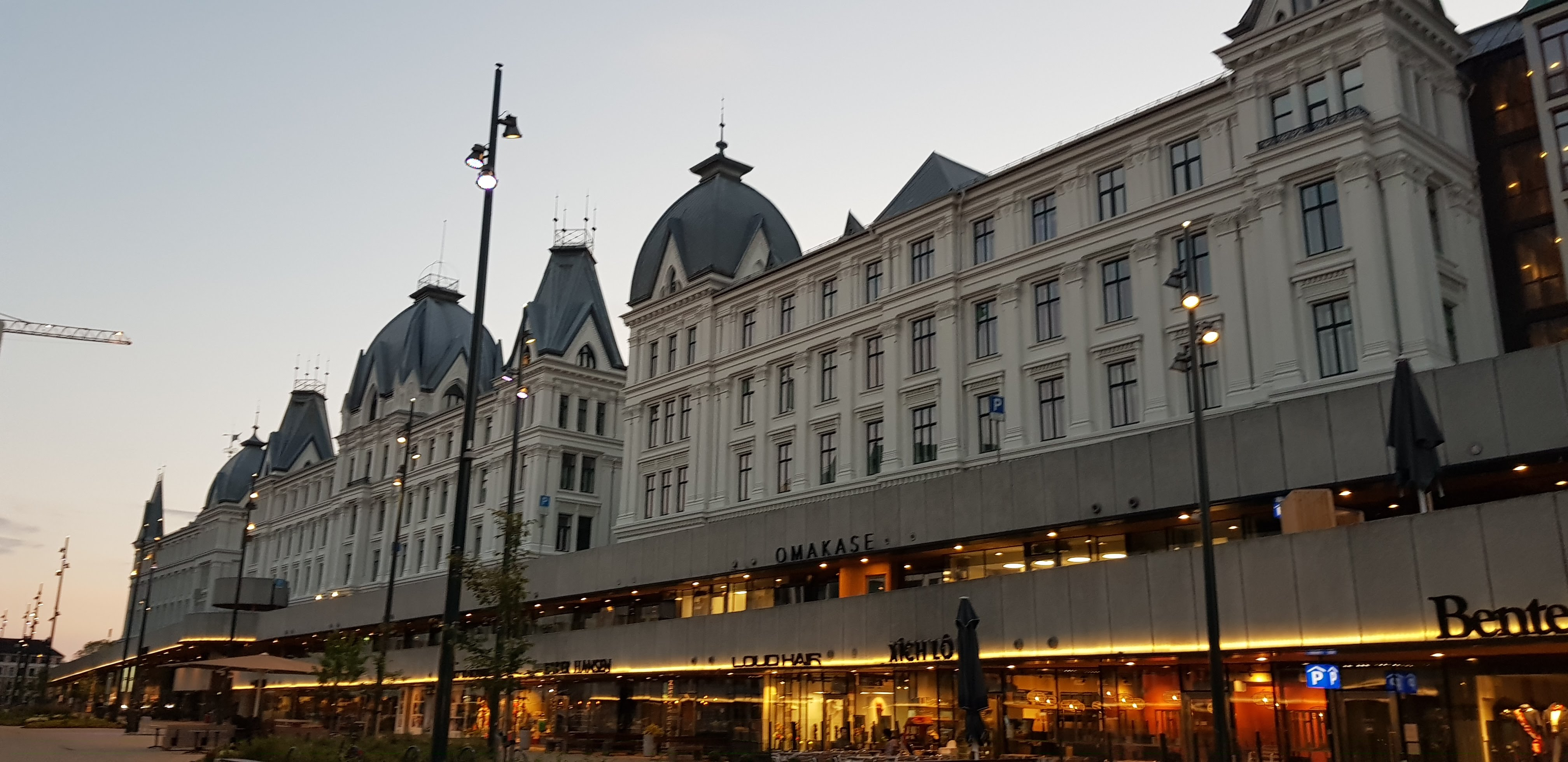
May 2018

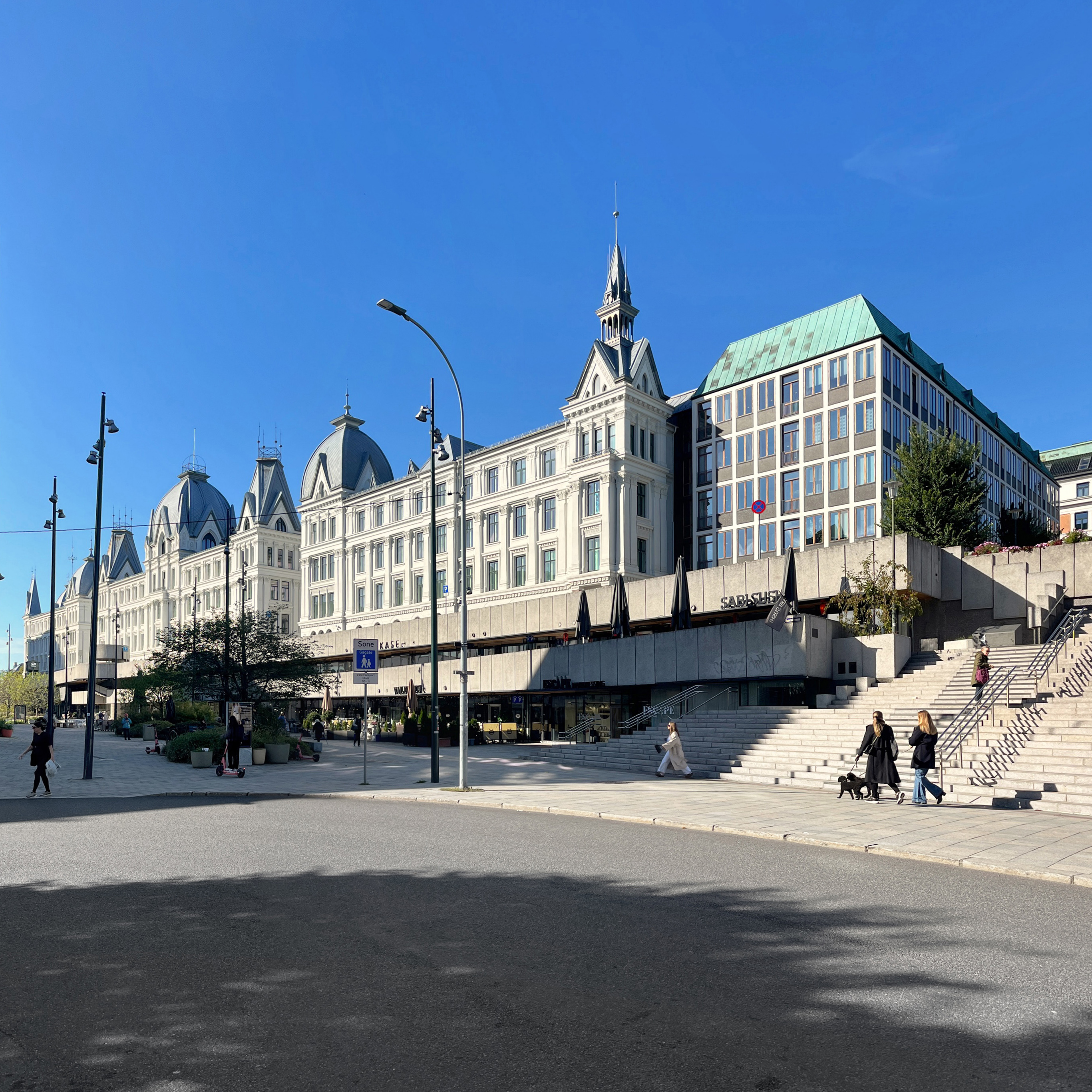
September 2025

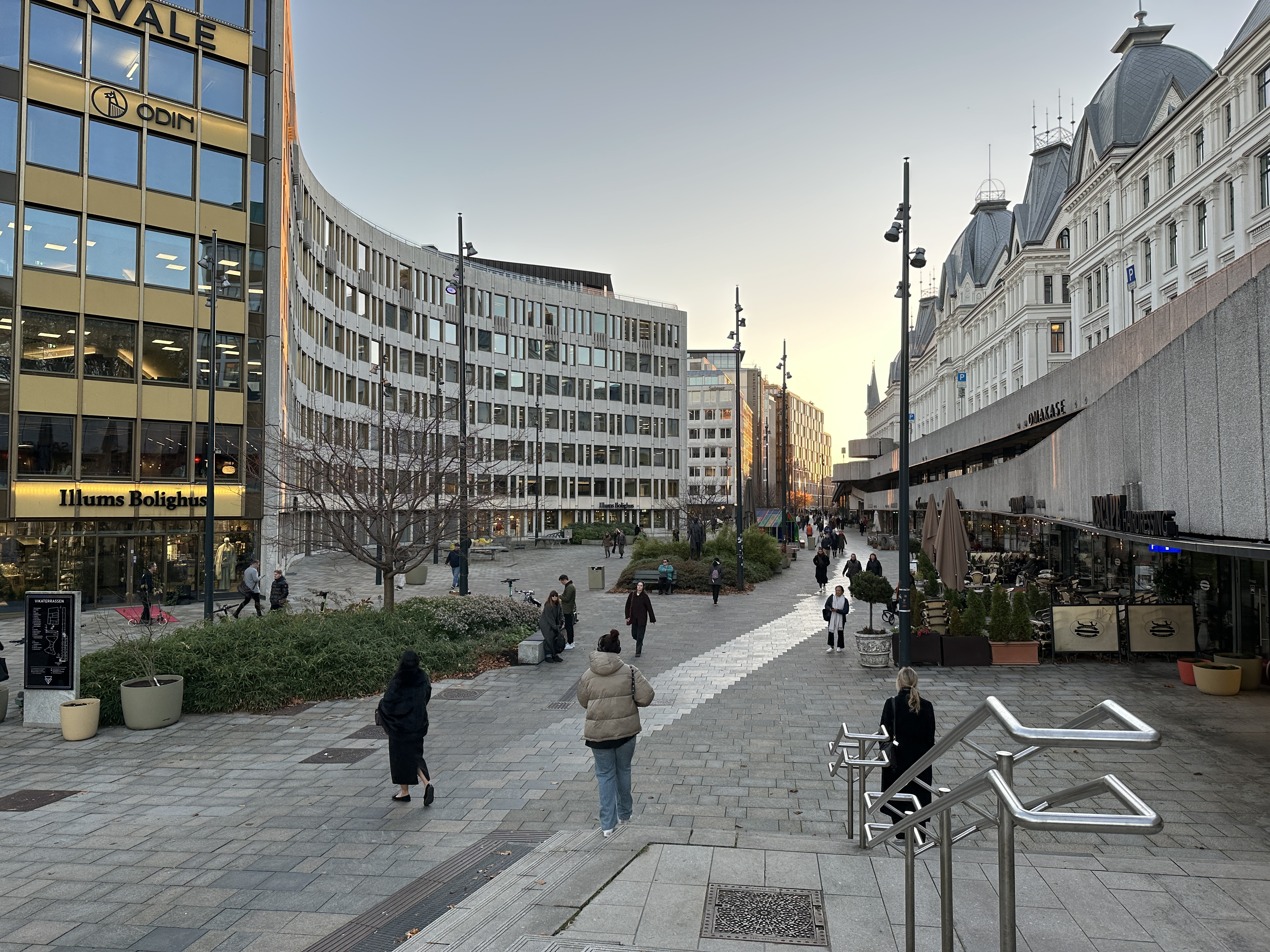
November 2024

== See also ==
- Oslo Mosquito Raid (1942)
- Oslo Mosquito Raid (1944)
