= Glossary of RAF code names =

Code words used by the Royal Air Force during the Second World War:

- Angels – height in thousands of feet.
- Balbo – a large formation of aircraft.
- Bandit – identified enemy aircraft.
- Bogey – unidentified (possibly unfriendly) aircraft.
- Buster – radio-telephony code phrase for 'maximum throttle' or full power climb.
- Cab rank – an airborne patrol of fighter-bombers near a combat zone which could be called upon to attack specific targets as necessary.
- Channel Stop – air operations intended to stop enemy shipping passing through the Straits of Dover.
- Circus – daytime bomber attacks with fighter escorts against short range targets, to occupy enemy fighters and keep them in the area concerned.
- Diver – radio-telephony code word for a sighted V-1 flying bomb.
- Fighter night – introduced in November 1940, night patrols above a specified height with orders to shoot down any multi-engined aircraft.
- Flower – counter-air patrols in the area of enemy airfields to preventing aircraft from taking off and attacking those aircraft that succeeded.
- Gardening – mine-laying operations.
- Instep – missions to restrict attacks on Coastal Command aircraft by maintaining a presence over the Western Approaches.
- Interdiction – missions to carry out low-level attacks against enemy communications: railways, shipping, and road traffic.
- Intruder – offensive patrols to destroy enemy aircraft over their own territory, usually carried out at night.
- Jager – a hostile aircraft that is at a higher altitude than the pilot's aircraft.
- Jim Crow – coastal patrols to intercept enemy aircraft crossing the British coastline; originally intended to warn of invasion in 1940.
- Kipper – patrols to protect fishing boats in the North Sea against air attack.
- Mahmoud – bombing operations accompanied by de Havilland Mosquitoes equipped with rear-facing radar; if an enemy aircraft was detected a 180° turn would enable an attack.
- Mandolin – attacks on enemy railway transport and other ground targets.
- Moonshine – jamming operations, originally involving the Defiants of No. 515 Squadron RAF, against German radar.
- Noball – attacks on V-weapons launch sites and related targets.
- Pancake - Code word ordering an aircraft or formation to land.
- Rag – decoy flying operations to misdirect the enemy.
- Ramrod – short range bomber attacks to destroy ground targets, similar to Circus attacks.
- Ranger – freelance flights over enemy territory by units of any size, to occupy and tire enemy fighters.
- Rhubarb – fighter or fighter-bomber sections, at times of low cloud and poor visibility, crossing the English Channel and then dropping below cloud level to search for opportunity targets such as railway locomotives and rolling stock, aircraft on the ground, enemy troops, and vehicles on roads.
- Roadstead – dive bombing and low level attacks on enemy ships at sea or in harbour.
- Rodeo – fighter sweeps over enemy territory.
- Rover – armed reconnaissance flights with attacks on opportunity targets.
- Scramble – fast take-off and climb to intercept enemy aircraft.
- Serrate – equipment enabling aircraft to home on enemy aircraft transmissions.
- Siren Tour - early morning light bombing raid, to wake up the German town at 4am in the morning, from 1944 by the de Havilland Mosquito
- Sortie – a flight by one aircraft, thus a mission by one squadron might be termed as 11 sorties.
- Tally-ho – radio-telephony code word for 'enemy in sight'.
- Vector - fighter controllers' code word giving a heading to steer.
- Window – an early term for chaff, aluminium foil dropped to confuse enemy radar.

== See also ==
- List of World War II electronic warfare equipment
- Multiservice tactical brevity code
