= Combat air patrol =

Military flying mission

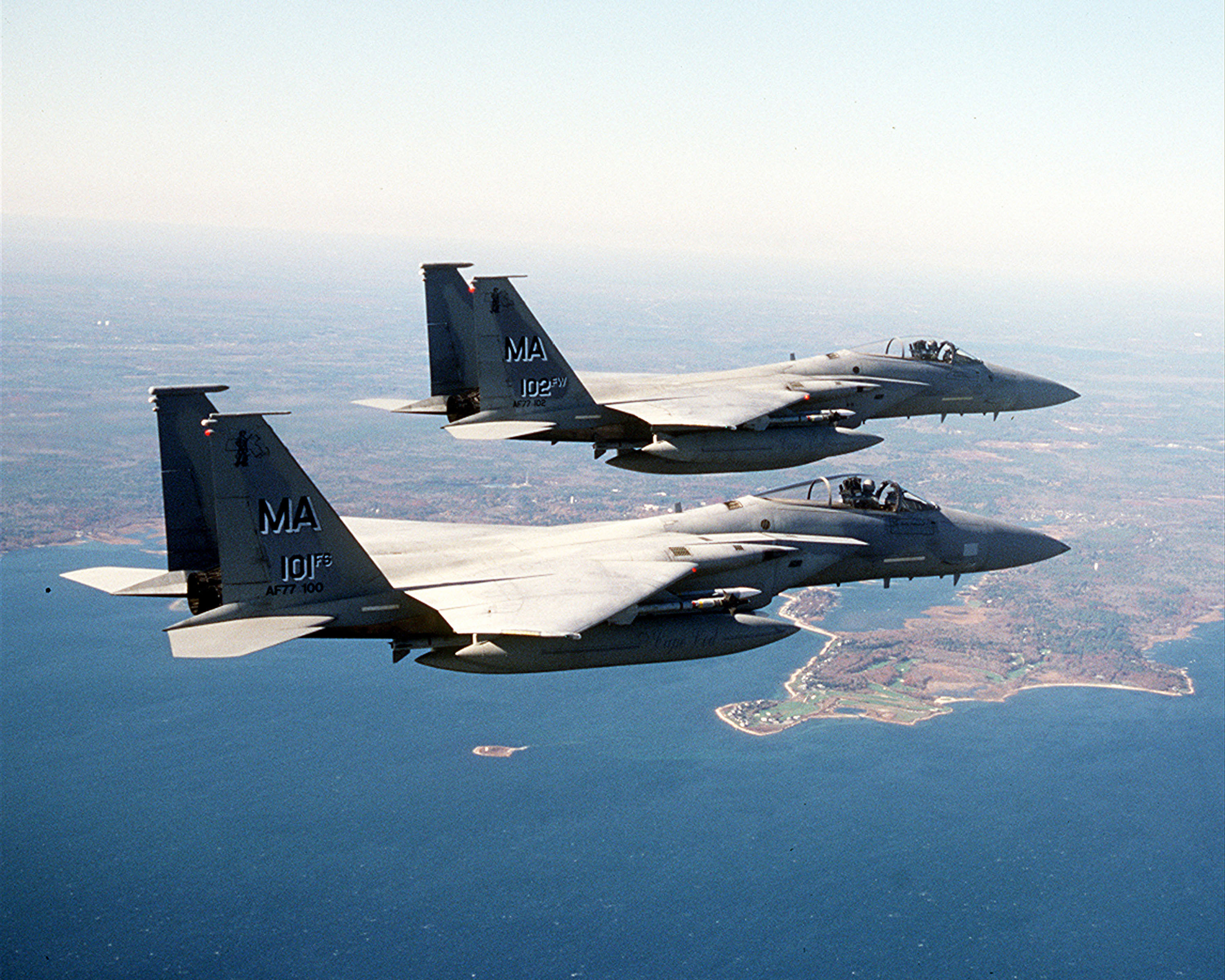
Two F-15 Eagles from the Massachusetts Air National Guard's 102nd Fighter Wing fly a combat air patrol mission over New York City in support of Operation Noble Eagle

Combat air patrol (CAP) is a type of flying mission for fighter aircraft. A combat air patrol is an aircraft patrol provided over an objective area, over the force protected, over the critical area of a combat zone, or over an air defense area, for the purpose of intercepting and destroying hostile aircraft before they reach their target. Combat air patrols apply to both overland and overwater operations, protecting other aircraft, fixed and mobile sites on land, or ships at sea.

Known by the acronym CAP, it typically entails fighters flying a tactical pattern around or screening a defended target, while looking for incoming attackers. Effective CAP patterns may include aircraft positioned at both high and low altitudes, in order to shorten response times when an attack is detected. Modern CAPs are either GCI or AWACS-controlled to provide maximum early warning for defensive reaction.

The first CAPs were characteristic of aircraft carrier operations, where CAPs were flown to protect a carrier battle group, but the term has become generic to both land-based and naval flight operations. Capping operations differ from fighter escorts in that the CAP force is not tied to the group it is protecting, is not limited in altitudes and speeds it flies, and has tactical flexibility to engage a threat. Fighter escorts typically stay with the asset they are supporting and at the speed of the supported group, as a final reactive force against a close threat. When an escort engages, the supported force is left unprotected.

== CAP types ==
This section applies only to United States forces. Numerous types of combat air patrols have been employed by US military forces since World War II:

- BARCAP: "Barrier combat air patrol", in fleet terms, a mission flown between a carrier battle group and the direction from which it is most likely that an enemy attack will come. Also refers to fighter aircraft placed between a friendly strike force and an area of expected airborne threat, also known as a "MiG screen".
- BATCAP: Evening combat air patrol
- CAP/Strike: Aircraft with a primary CAP role and a secondary strike role; such aircraft are permitted to jettison strike ordnance and actively pursue any enemy aircraft sighted, and are not restricted to defensive encounters.
- DADCAP: Dawn to dusk combat air patrol
- FastCAP: Combat air patrol to protect fighter strike aircraft.
- FORCAP: "Force combat air patrol", a patrol of fighters maintained over the strike force, essentially an escort.
- HAVCAP: "High asset value combat air patrol", flown to protect a "high-value asset" such as an AWACS or J-STARS aircraft, aerial refueling aircraft, or intelligence, surveillance and reconnaissance (ISR) aircraft during its specific time on station. Also called HVAACAP for "high value airborne asset CAP".
- JACKCAP: Combat air patrol covering four quadrants with another outer screen
- MiGCAP: Used primarily during the Vietnam War, a MiGCAP is directed specifically against MiG aircraft. MiGCAP during Operation Linebacker became highly organized and threefold:
  - an ingress MiGCAP of 2–3 flights (8–12 fighters) that preceded the first supporting forces such as chaff bombers or SAM suppressors and remained until they departed the hostile zone
  - a target area MiGCAP of at least 2 flights that immediately preceded the actual strikers
  - an egress MiGCAP of 1 or 2 flights that arrived on station at the projected exit point ten minutes prior to the earliest egress time. All egress MiGCAP flights were fully fueled from tankers and relieved the target area CAP.
- RAPCAP: Radar picket combat air patrol
- RESCAP: "Rescue combat air patrol", a fighter force, often drawn from aircraft already in the area, used to protect personnel on the ground (such as downed pilots) from ground threats, as well as combat search and rescue aircraft or other rescue forces from both ground and air threats.
- SARCAP: "Search and rescue combat air patrol", an earlier version of RESCAP.
- SCOCAP: Scouting combat air patrol
- Slow CAP: A combat air patrol to protect slower aircraft, such as the EA-3B / EKA-3B, P-3A / P-3B, EB-66 / RB-66, B-52, or EC-121 during the Vietnam War; replaced by "HAVCAP".
- Strike/CAP: Aircraft with a primary strike role and a secondary air defense role, permitted to jettison strike ordnance and engage enemy aircraft only if directly attacked. Strike/CAP aircraft also have an egress CAP role once strike ordnance has been delivered on target.
- TARCAP: "Target combat air patrol" is flown over or near a strike target in order to protect specialized attack aircraft such as AC-130 gunships from enemy fighters.

== See also ==
- Index of aviation articles
- List of aviation, avionics, aerospace and aeronautical abbreviations
- List of established military terms
- Glossary of military abbreviations
- Counter-air patrol
