= Counter-air patrol =

Counter-air patrol, known as Flower missions in RAF parlance, is a type of flying mission for fighter aircraft against other fighters, common in World War II and sometimes combined with fighter sweeps (Rhubarb missions) against targets of opportunity. Counter-air patrol is an attempt to achieve air superiority by maintaining patrols above and around enemy airfields.

Aircraft are vulnerable on take off, fully loaded and working to gain altitude and speed. The aim of the counter-air patrol was to pick off enemy fighters as they took off and during their climb to an operational height. Fighter sweeps were used both to attrit the enemy and to provide cover for bombing raids by forcing enemy fighters to protect their own airfields.

== See also ==
- Combat air patrol
- Intruder (air combat)
- Offensive counter air
