= Siren Tour =

Former RAF night-time mission

A Siren Tour was a night-time mission by the RAF Bomber Command, mostly in northern Cambridgeshire, involving three or four two-engined fast bomber aircraft, to set the German air-raid sirens off in the middle of the night, so waking up the whole German town at three o'clock in the morning. The purpose was to cause nuisance, and sleep deprivation.

== History ==
The raids were carried out by RAF bases in Cambridgeshire and Huntingdonshire, from the Light Night Striking Force. These were small bombing raids, often in the middle of the night, to get the population in the German town out of bed, on the sound of a Fliegeralarm, to intentionally upset the nocturnal rhythm by false alarms of the German factory workers; night shift workers would have to go to the shelters, and day shift workers had their sleep disturbed. It was to make German citizens mentally unfit for work.

Although these were small raids, the raids were quite irritating for German people. The two-engined bomber aircraft were largely invincible from any attack; for the first six hundred Mosquito missions over Germany, only one was shot down.

Once the bomb was dropped, the twin-engined bomber could return to Cambridgeshire at 400 mph, being invisible to radar.

== Tactics ==
It feigned a larger raid, a nuisance raid. It would take place alongside spoof raids on a secondary target, which were deception tactics. It would often accompany the main bomber force beforehand, dropping the window radar deception, then the Mosquito aircraft subsequently went on the Siren Tour.

== Operation ==
The raids apparently began on 30 November 1943, or thereabouts. There were around three aircraft in each raid, but with three or four targets. Each target would receive a 500 lb bomb from the aircraft.

Siren tours would continue throughout early 1945. The aircraft took off from RAF Upwood, RAF Graveley, RAF Little Staughton RAF Gransden Lodge, RAF Oakington, and RAF Wyton, all part of 8 Group (PFF).

=== Schedule ===
1945

- 24 February, Dessau, Erfurt and Halle
- 4 March, Kiel, Lubeck, Hamburg and Wilhelmshaven
- 5 March, Kiel, Lubeck, Hamburg and Hanover
- 7 March, Hanover, Berlin, and Dessau
- 8 March, Osnabruck, Hanover, and Bremen
- 9 March, Osnabruck
- 11 March, Hanover, Brunswick, and Magdeburg
- 14 March, Bremen, Hanover, and Berlin
- 15 March, Erfurt, Weimar and Jena
- 16 March, Osnabruck, Berlin and Brunswick
- 26 March, Berlin and Magdeburg
- 27 March, Bremen, Magdeburg and Hanover
- 29 March, Bremen and Hanover
- 30 March, Hamburg and Kiel
- 2 April, Hamburg and Lubeck
- 3 April Magdeburg and Berlin

== See also ==
- Circus offensive, involved small numbers of bombers, with a large force of fighter aircraft
- de Havilland Mosquito operational history
- Washing Machine Charlie, a solitary Japanese night-time nuisance aircraft, often flown with the Mitsubishi G4M
