= Oslo Mosquito raid (1944) =

World War Two Raid

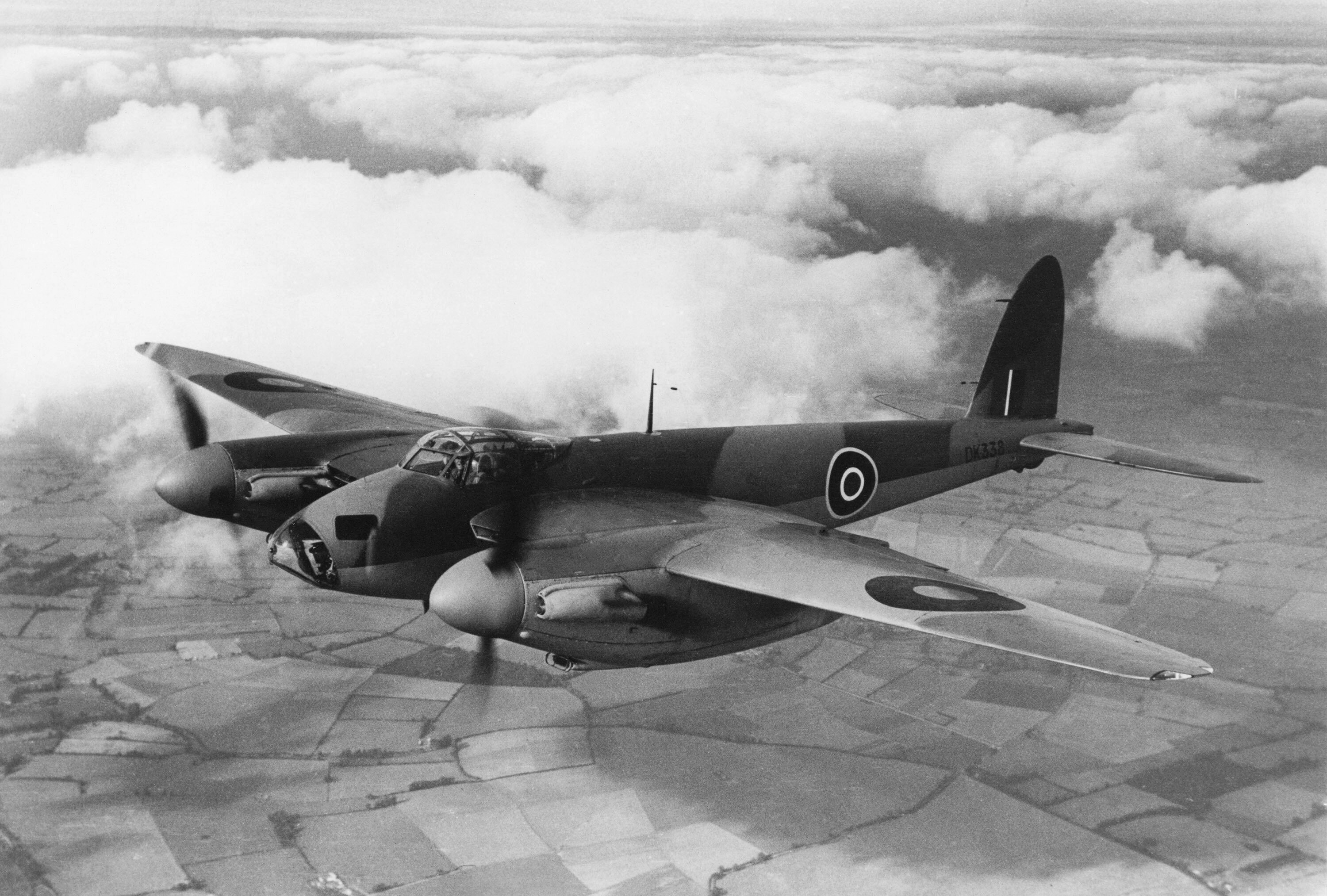
- De Havilland Mosquito from RAF No.105 squadron
Date	31 December 1944
Location	Oslo, Norway
Result	Inconclusive

Belligerents
United Kingdom	Germany

Strength
12 De Havilland Mosquitos	Anti Aircraft Artillery

Casualties and losses
78 Civilian Deaths 58 Civilians Injured	27 Germans

The Oslo Mosquito raid (1944) was a Second World War air raid carried out by the British Royal Air Force that targeted the Nazi Gestapo headquarters in Oslo, Norway. The raid was carried out using 12 twin-engined De Havilland Mosquito bomber aircraft on 31 December 1944. The RAF attacked the Gestapo headquarters, which were housed in buildings on Victoria Terrasse, with 500lb and 1000lb bombs. The RAF hit their target but 44 Norwegian civilians also died when a bomb hit a nearby tram.

== Raid ==
=== Preparation ===
In preparation for the raid, RAF Squadron No. 627 flew, on 30 December 1944, the day before the raid, from their own base at RAF Woodhall Spa to RAF Peterhead in order to reduce flight time to Oslo.

=== Attack ===
On 31 December 1944, 12 Mosquito bombers departed RAF Peterhead at 9:30. The planes attacked in two waves. The first wave of six aircraft was led by Wing Commander G.W. Curry, and the second wave by Flight Lieutenant P.F. Mallender.

Around noon, the bombers arrived at the Norwegian coast at an altitude of approximately 2,100 m (7,000 ft) with each of the 12 aircraft carrying either four 500lb or two 1000lb bombs. The weather was clear, so that while the airmen easily spotted Victoria Terrasse, they were also spotted, and the Mosquito bombers came under intense anti-aircraft fire.

The first wave commenced an attack run at an altitude of 300-450 m (1000-1500 ft) and scored several hits against their target. When the second wave came in, Lt. Mallender realised that the buildings were now obscured by smoke. He told his pilots not to release their bombs unless they could visibly confirm the target. However, some pilots ignored this order and dropped their bombs anyway, resulting in one bomb hitting Oslo Tram No. 115, killing 44 people, nearly all the civilians onboard.

=== Result ===
Victoria Terrasse was damaged and the Gestapo was forced to move to a new base. However, 78 civilians were killed and 58 injured. In contrast, the Germans suffered only 27 casualties, mostly among Luftwaffe auxiliary staff. All of the planes returned to their home base of Woodhall Spa but all suffered some flak damage.

== See also ==
- Oslo Mosquito raid (1942)

== Bibliography ==
- Stenersen, Sten. "Mosquitos over Oslo: The British Air Raids on the Gestapo H.Q. in Norway." Air Pictorial 41 (1979): 314–[unk]. Preview accessed via Google Books.
