= Oslo Mosquito raid (1942) =

WWII air raid

Coordinates: 59°54′51″N 10°43′42″E

- Part of Second World War
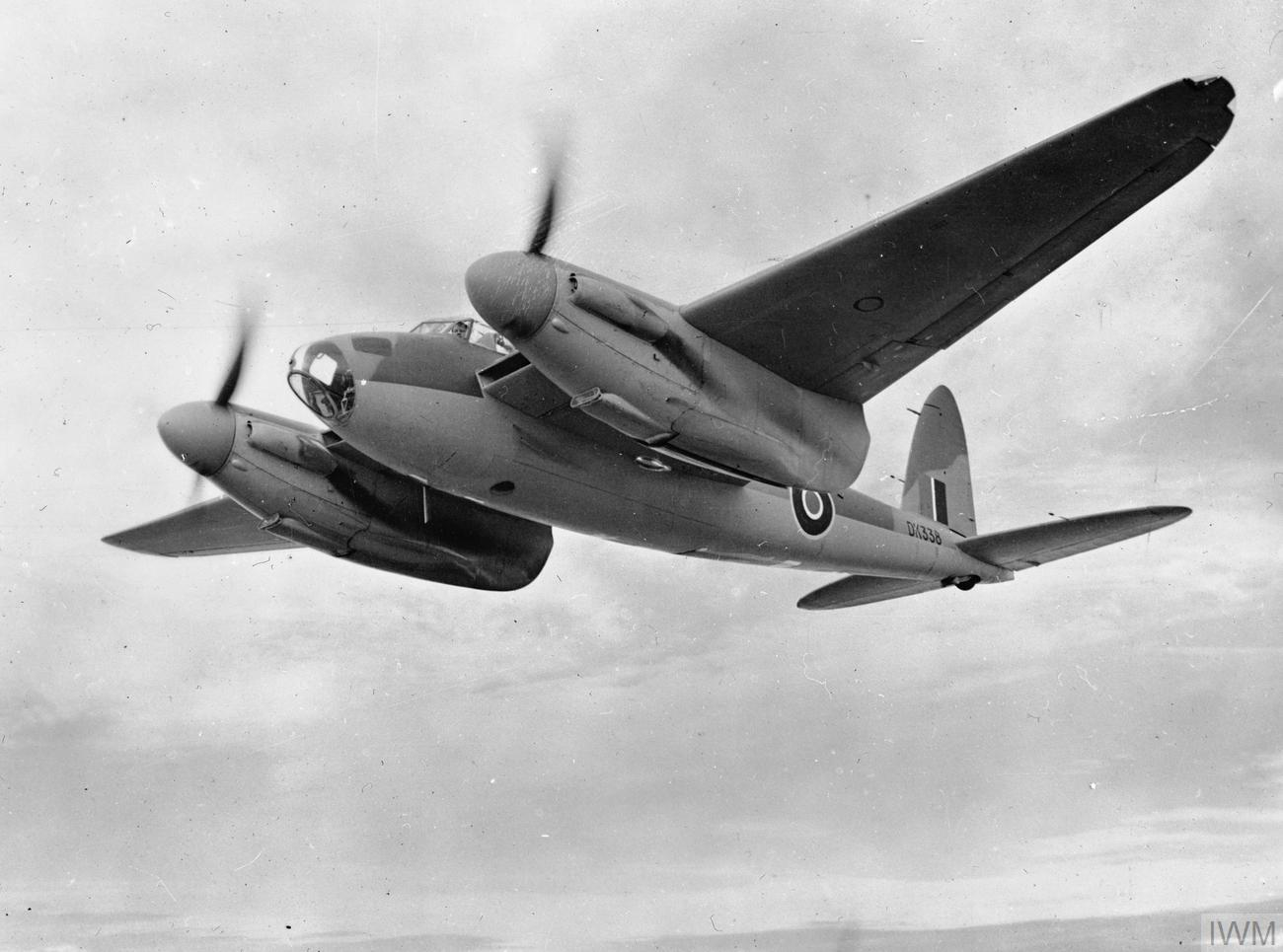
- A No. 105 Squadron Mosquito B Mark IV in 1942
Date	25 September 1942; 84 years ago
Location	Oslo, Norway
Result	German Victory

Belligerents
United Kingdom	(Nazi Germany) Germany (Norway) Quisling regime

Commanders and leaders
(United Kingdom) Squadron Leader D.A. Parry	(Nazi Germany) Unteroffizier Erich Klein

Units involved
(United Kingdom) No.105 Squadron RAF	(Nazi Germany) Small Detachment of 4 Fw 190s from 3 Staffel JG/5

Strength
4 Mosquitos	4 Fw 190; Various anti-aircraft defences

Casualties and losses
1 Mosquito Destroyed 2 Killed	2 Germans killed
- 6 Norwegian civilians killed

The Oslo Mosquito raid (25 September 1942) was a British air raid on Oslo, Norway, that was sanctioned by the Norwegian government in exile in London during the Second World War. The target of the raid was the Victoria Terrasse building, the headquarters of the Gestapo in Norway. It was intended to be a "morale booster" for the Norwegian people and was scheduled to coincide with a rally of Norwegian collaborators led by Vidkun Quisling. The raid is also known for it being the moment when the Royal Air Force revealed the existence of the Mosquito aircraft to the British public, when the BBC Home Service reported on the raid the following day.

== Background ==
Barely twenty days after the Germans invaded Norway on 9 April 1940, an advance force of the Gestapo arrived at Fornebu in fourteen Junkers aircraft. After a short stay at the Blindern Students Hostel and at a suburban hotel in Oslo, the Gestapo moved into the foreign ministry building, Victoria Terrasse, in the beginning of May 1940.

In the autumn of 1942, resistance groups across occupied Europe, in consultation with Britain, agreed that the various Gestapo headquarters should be bombed. The first target selected was Victoria Terrasse in Oslo. Shortly before this, the RAF, which was to carry out the raid, had taken delivery of a new and believed unrivalled aircraft, the de Havilland Mosquito, and decided to use it for the raid due to its excellent low altitude performance.

Victoria Terrasse was being used by the Gestapo under the leadership of SS Hauptsturmführer Siegfried Wolfgang Fehmer and was in direct communication with Reich Security Main Office in Berlin.

Friday 25 September was the start of the Norwegian Nazis' 8th National Congress, and the raid was timed to coincide with a march past before their leader, Quisling at 18.30. Since German fighter aircraft were not normally stationed at Fornebu, four Fw190s from 3 Staffel JG/5 were sent to provide air cover.

== Preparation ==
The operation was carried out by four de Havilland Mosquito aircraft of No. 105 Squadron RAF, led by Squadron Leader George Parry, flying with navigator Flying Officer "Robbie" Robson. The other three crews consisted of:

- Flight Lieutenant Pete Rowland and Flying Officer Richard Reilly
- Flying Officer Alec Bristow and Pilot Officer Bernard Marshall
- Flight Sergeant Gordon Carter and Sergeant William Young.

In order to shorten the mission distance, the four aircraft were flown to RAF Leuchars in Fife, Scotland, where they were refuelled and loaded with eight delayed action 1,000-pound (450 kg) bombs, each aircraft having two.

== The operation ==
The operation began in the early afternoon of 25 September when four Mosquitos of 105 Squadron took off from Leuchars. They flew 1,100 miles (1,800 km) in 4.75 hours, the longest mission flown with Mosquitos to date. The bombers crossed the North Sea at less than 100 ft (30 m) to avoid interception by enemy aircraft and navigated by dead reckoning. Each aircraft was armed with two 1000 lb bombs with an eight-second delayed action fuse, since in such a low level attack the bombs could damage the aircraft if they exploded earlier.

The Mosquitos were spotted as they flew to Oslo along the Skagerrak. Four Fw 190s were scrambled but only Klein's and Unteroffizer Fenten's aircraft were equipped with integral starters. Ten minutes after taking off they spotted the Mosquitos and assumed they were Douglas Bostons.

Unaware of the danger, the Mosquitos identified their target in the good weather and approached, dropping all their bombs, with the pilots noting they all landed near the target, with Parry believing he scored a direct hit. The Fw 190s caught up with them as this was happening.

Squadron Leader Parry and Flying Officer Robson's aircraft (DK296G) was first, and successfully attacked the target from 100 ft (30m), before being engaged by two Fw 190 over the target. Parry managed to evade, and observed direct hits on the main building before flying back to RAF Sumburgh. Flight Lieutenant Rowland and Flying Officer Reilly's aircraft (DK313U) was second and also successfully attacked the target at 100 ft. This time the aircraft was attacked by one Fw 190 after flying away from the target, but was able to escape and land safely back at RAF Sumburgh, despite suffering damage from cannon fire. Flying Officer Bristow and Pilot Officer Marshall's aircraft (DK328V) was third, and successfully attacked the target at 100 ft. It was then engaged by two Fw 190s over the target, but was also able to evade, and landed at RAF Sumburgh. Flight Sergeant Carter and Sergeant Young's aircraft (DK325S) was last, and was attacked by Erich Klein's Fw 190 over the target, causing smoke to pour from the starboard engine. The other three aircraft saw this, and Carter radioed that they would try to land in Sweden. The aircraft ended up in a lake on the outskirts of the city. Flight Sergeant Carter, aged 28, and Sergeant Young, aged 20, both died in the crash. Their bodies were recovered by Norwegians Rikard Nilsen and Fredrik Høgli with the help of dye from bags on the airmen's life vests. DK325S was later recovered by the Germans after the plane was looted by the Norwegians. The two men were buried at Vestre gravlund.

A few days afterwards, Britain became aware that one of the four bombs failed to detonate and the remaining three crashed through the building before detonating, leading to minimal damage and causing the raid to be deemed a failure.

== Impact ==
Although the raid had failed to achieve its objective, it was considered dramatic enough to reveal the existence of the Mosquito to the British public, and the following day (26 September) listeners to the BBC Home Service learned that the RAF was using this new aircraft and that four had made a low level attack on Oslo. The Mosquito bomber was featured in The Times on 28 September, and the next day the newspaper published two captioned photographs illustrating the Oslo bomb strikes and damage.

Victoria Terrasse also remained in operation after the attack leading to another bombing raid on 31 December 1944 which also failed to destroy the building.

== See also ==
- Oslo Mosquito raid (1944), an attack on the same Gestapo Headquarters
- Aarhus Air Raid, a similar attack on Gestapo headquarters in Aarhus, Denmark
- Operation Carthage, a similar attack on Gestapo headquarters in Copenhagen, Denmark, in April 1945, with 125 off-target civilian casualties
- Operation Jericho, a similar attack on Amiens Prison in France
