= Patrick Dorehill =

British RAF officer (1921–2016)

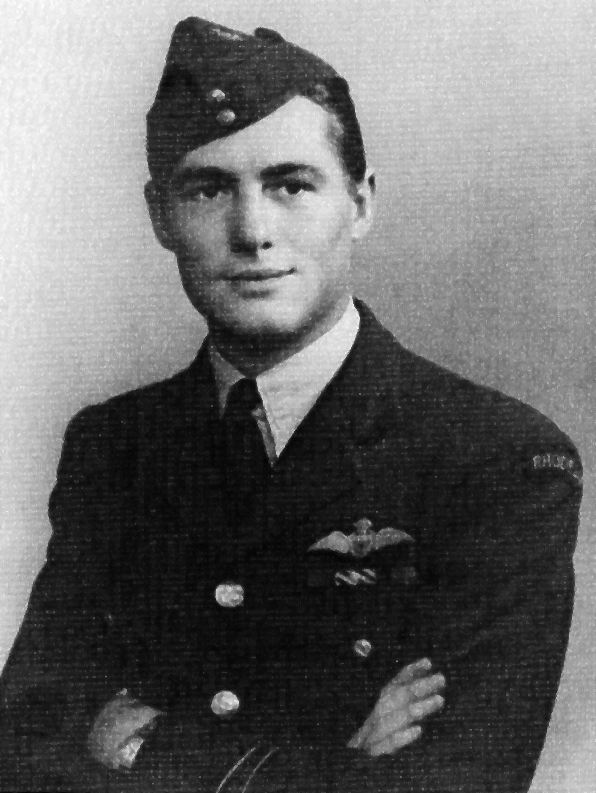
- Patrick Dorehill in 1942
- Born: 4 July 1921; Fort Victoria, Southern Rhodesia
- Died: 7 June 2016 (aged 94); Crowborough, East Sussex
- Military career
- Allegiance: United Kingdom
- Branch: Royal Air Force
- Service years: 1940–1945
- Conflicts: Second World War
- Awards: Distinguished Service Order; Distinguished Flying Cross & Bar

Patrick Arthur Dorehill, DSO, DFC & Bar (4 July 1921 – 7 June 2016) was an officer in the Royal Air Force. A bomber pilot, he flew as flight engineer for John Nettleton during the Augsburg raid, where they carried out a daring daylight attack against the MAN U-boat engine plant at Augsburg in southern Germany, earning him an immediate DFC and his captain the Victoria Cross. He completed two full combat tours as a bomber pilot. With his commitment to combat flying completed, he was transferred to the BOAC where he flew transports. Following the war Dorehill had a lengthy career as a commercial airline pilot.

== Early life ==
Dorehill was born on 4 July 1921 at Fort Victoria in the British Crown colony of Southern Rhodesia. His father worked as a government district administrator, and they lived in a remote mining area. Unhappy with married life in the African outback, his parents divorced and his mother returned to England while Patrick was being schooled at Michaelhouse in South Africa. In 1938 he studied mining engineering at Rand University and briefly worked in the coal mines. Dorehill was at the university when war had broken out, and immediately volunteered for the air force. After gaining his wings in Rhodesia he was selected to fly bombers, and shipped out to England to complete his training.

== First tour ==
By the autumn of 1941, he was posted as a sergeant pilot to No. 44 (Rhodesia) Squadron, where he began flying the twin-engine Handley Page Hampden. He flew his first operation on 31 August 1941. His early operations involved attacks upon the German warships Scharnhorst and Gneisenau and heavy cruiser Prinz Eugen harbored in Brest. He also dropped mines in the entrances of German-held ports. The squadron began conversion to the Lancaster in January 1942. It was the first squadron to be equipped with the new bomber. Having survived some fifteen ops, Dorehill's four-man crew was split up, with Dorehill being posted onto Nettleton's crew as flight engineer as preparation for his conversion to piloting Lancasters. Dorehill flew in the aircraft for the first time on 6 January 1942, and was with Nettleton on the night of 3 March when they flew the Lancaster's first operation of the war, dropping mines in the seas around Heligoland. The aircraft was unknown to the Germans. Compared to the Hampden, the Lancaster was a much bigger, stronger aircraft, and it had much greater defensive fire power. Its first mission, involving a very long flight over enemy territory in daylight, would require all of its strengths.

=== The Augsburg Raid ===
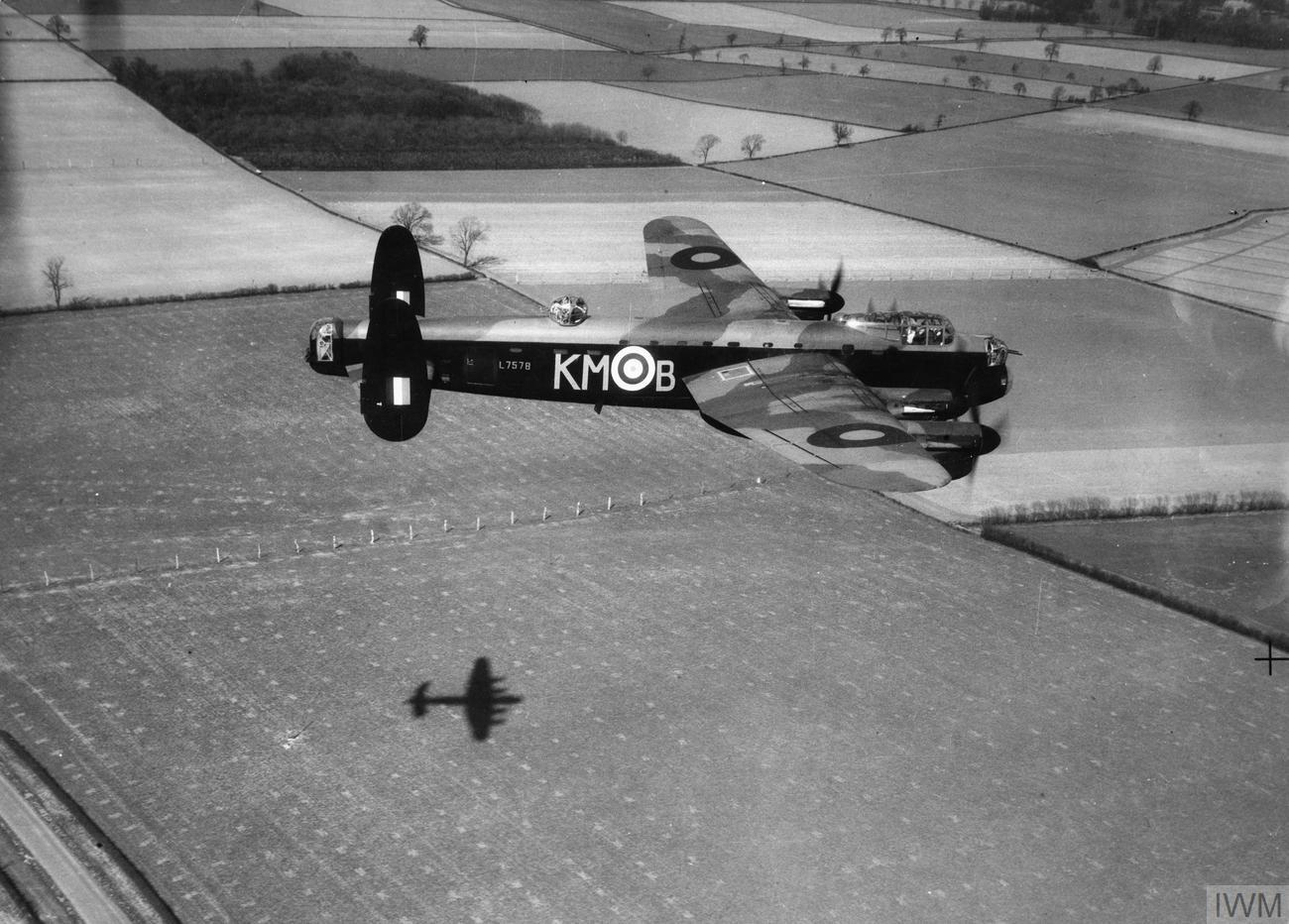
Nettelton racing along at low level

The Augsburg raid was the first use of the Lancaster over enemy held terrain. Six Lancasters from 44 Squadron and six from 97 Squadron were tasked with flying to the MAN U-boat engine plant in Augsburg, southern Germany. The MAN plant produced half the U-boat engines in use. To bomb the target accurately, the raid was made in the light of day. The mission involved flying over 500 miles across enemy occupied territory to reach the target. As no fighter aircraft at the time were able to fly such a distance, the decision was made to try to slip the attackers behind the German air defences by flying diversionary raids to the north and south of the entry point for the Lancasters. The bombing groups would fly at low level to avoid detection by German radar.

At the time of the Augsburg raid Dorehill was 20 years old, with 15 missions piloting Hampdens behind him. Beside him and leading the squadron was Squadron Leader John Nettleton, a 25 year old South African who was an experienced pilot approaching the end of his first tour. As flight engineer, Dorehill was beside Nettleton, and could sit in a fold down seat on the right side of the aircraft slightly behind the pilot. The flight engineer could also stand next to the pilot, and often did. Two squadrons were detailed, Waddington’s No. 44 (Rhodesia) Squadron and No. 97 Squadron at Woodhall Spa, each providing six aircraft plus one reserve.

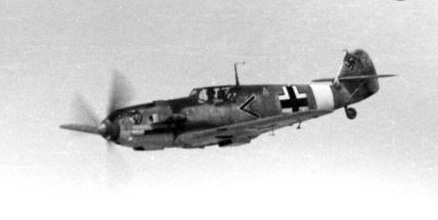
The Messerschmitt Bf 109

During the week before the raid both squadrons were taken off the bombing campaign to practice low level formation flying and bombing. The final practice flight took the bombers south to Selsey Bill, then north to a practice target in Inverness and finally back to base. On the morning if 17 April the crew members were called in to learn the target for their mission. Most were shocked to see the distance they had to go, and many in 97 Squadron laughed out loud, believing the map route must be some kind of joke, but it was not. For his part Dorehill was confident. "I thought flying at low level, with all the armament the Lancaster carried, I thought it would be an easy affair. I wasn't nervous at all." At 3:00 that afternoon they set out on their mission.

Shortly after they had crossed the French coast the course 44 Squadron took brought them along the outskirts of a German airfield. Unfortunately diversionary raids meant to draw German fighter aircraft away went off 40 minutes too early. Coming back from engaging the raiders, German fighters returning to base at Beaumont-le-Roger spotted Nettleton's Lancasters, veered off and went in pursuit of them. Led by II Gruppe commander Karl-Heinz Greisert, the German fighters closed the distance. Catching them, they set upon the rearward vic of aircraft, and one by one brought them down.

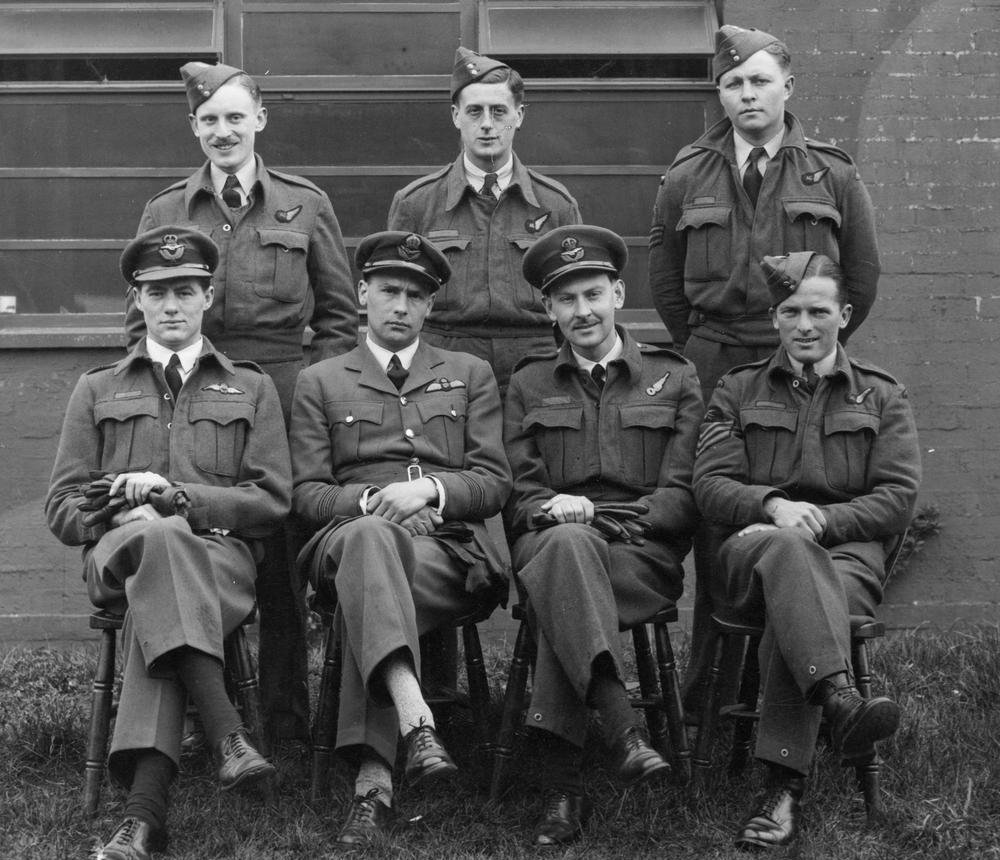
Nettleton and crew sit for a portrait after surviving the Augsburg raid. Dorehill is seated on the far left. Nettleton is seated next to him

With the loss of the trailing vic Dorehill's thoughts about the raid's chances changed. "Frankly I thought then, with the whole Luftwaffe up after us, that we'd never get there." At the point of the lead vic was Nettleton, with John Garwell flying the Lancaster to the left and "Dusty" Rhodes to the right. It was Rhodes' aircraft that was attacked next. His guns jammed from heavy firing, the bomber could no long put out defensive fire. The Lancaster was soon hit and engulfed in fire. His aircraft accelerated and pulled ahead of Nettleton's. Looking across Dorehill could see inside the cockpit, and it was all aflame. Dorehill watched as the aircraft suddenly pitched into a steep climb, and then dropped and dove into the ground. "Rhodes' aircraft only missed us by a fraction. You could see their faces in the cockpit. We raised up to escape being hit by him". Then came the blast of impact. The image of his friends struggling in the cockpit of their burning aircraft as it flashed past him haunted Dorehill the rest of his life.

Then suddenly the German fighters broke off and were not seen again. They still had over 300 miles of enemy occupied territory to go. “We could have escaped south,” Dorehill recalled, but Nettleton was determined to proceed — “quite rightly”.

Nettleton and Garwell continued on to the target, arriving shortly before the group of Lancasters from 97 Squadron, who had made the entire transit without being discovered by German fighters. Garwell was lost over the target, as were two aircraft from 97 Squadron. Of those 44 Squadron crews who had set out from Waddington that afternoon, Nettleton's crew was the only one that returned home. Dorehill was awarded the DFC for his part in the Augsburg raid, while Nettleton was awarded the Victoria Cross. A year later Nettleton would lose his life while returning from a long mission to Turin.

=== Completing first tour ===
Following the Augsburg raid Dorehill continued on with Nettleton shortly, going with him to the Air Fighting Development Unit at Duxford as Nettleton attempted to work out evasive tactics that could be used in the event of future fighter interceptions. Dorehill was then given his own Lancaster. He participated in the “Thousand Bomber” raid against Bremen on the night of 25/26 June 1942, the third thousand bomber raid put on by Bomber Command. When he had completed the 30 sorties that made up a first tour he was rotated off combat duty and spent the next year as an instructor at a heavy conversion unit. In December 1943 he returned to 44 Squadron to start his second tour.

== Second tour ==
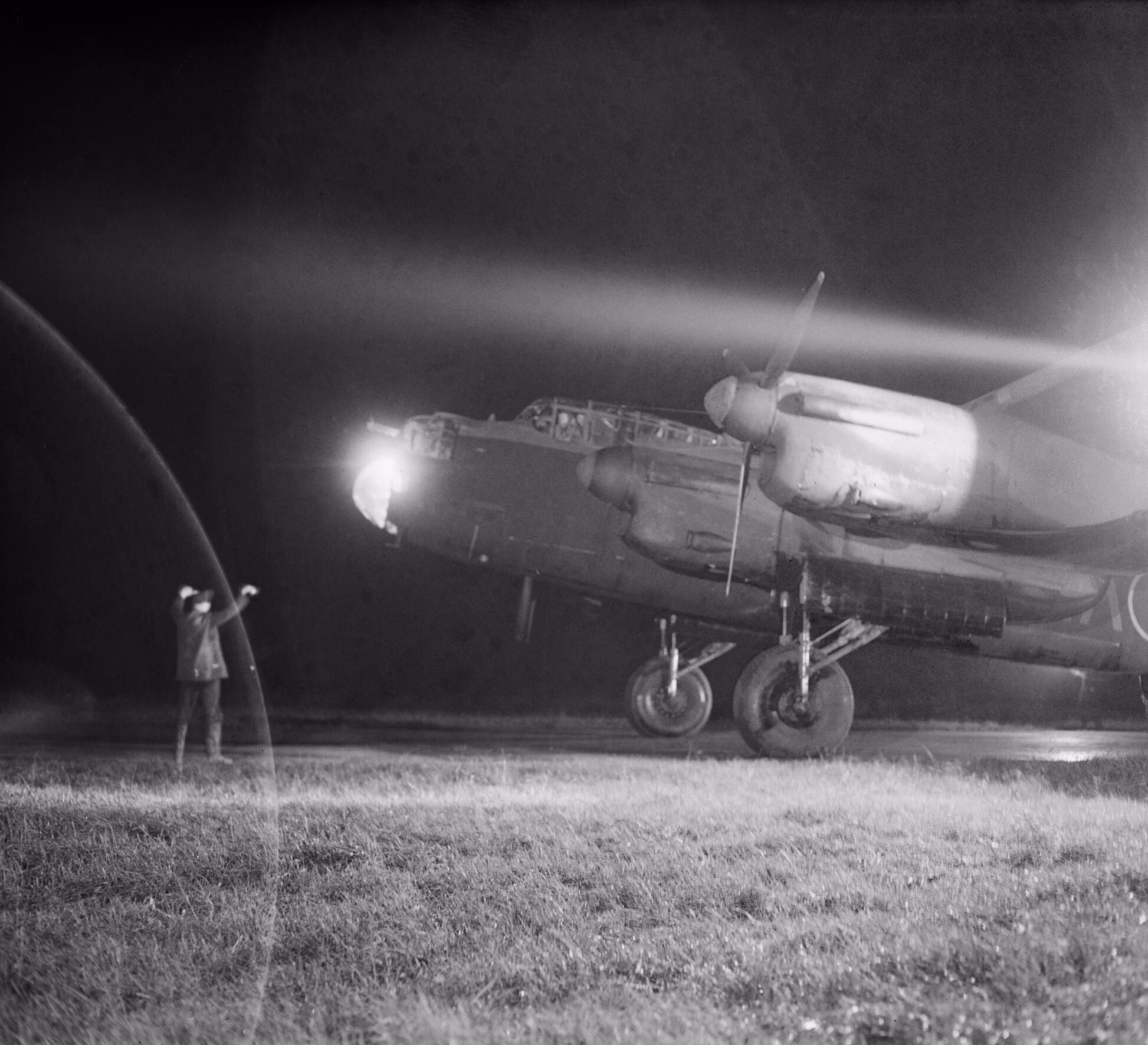
A Lancaster returning from a raid on Berlin

Dorehill's return to 44 Squadron coincided with Harris' Battle of Berlin. The "Big City", as Berlin was called by bomber crews, was a distant target. To reach it under the cover of darkness required the longer nights of winter. The campaign was commenced in November. Over the next three months Dorehill attacked some of the most heavily defended targets in Germany. He piloted seven trips to Berlin. On his way to Berlin in mid-April his aircraft was attacked by a German night fighter. The hydraulic system was knocked out. The aircraft suffered a large hole in its starboard wing, and there was damage to the rear of the fuselage. Nevertheless, Dorehill continued on to the target and delivered his bomb load. On his return to base Dorehill was forced to make a crash-landing. All his crew survived. Dorehill received a bar to his DFC for the raid, with the citation noting that his handling of the damaged aircraft had been "masterly". On 9 April Dorehill flew his 60th and final operation, a raid on Danzig. In September 1944, some four months after completing his second tour, Dorehill was awarded the DSO.

After completing his commitment for combat tours he spent a period of time as a pilot instructor on bombers. After a few months he was checked out on transport aircraft and in November 1944 was seconded to British Overseas Airways Corporation (BOAC), the British state-owned transport airline that had been created in 1940. He operated from Whitechurch, near Bristol. On 23 February 1945 he flew his first route, taking a Dakota to Castel Benito in Libya and then on to Egypt.

== Life after the war ==
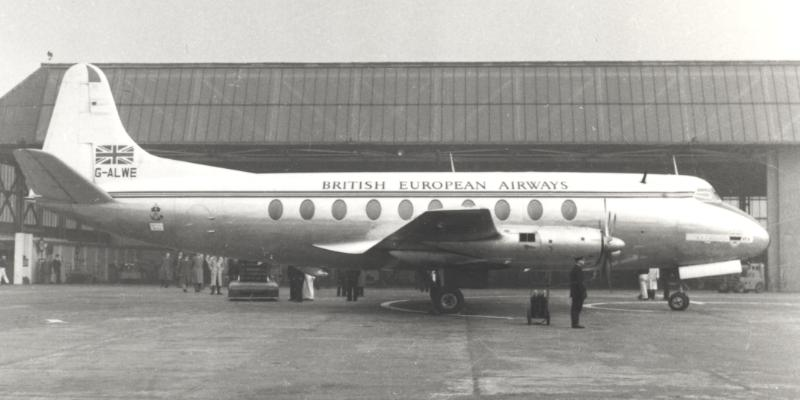
A Vickers Viscount of the British European Airways

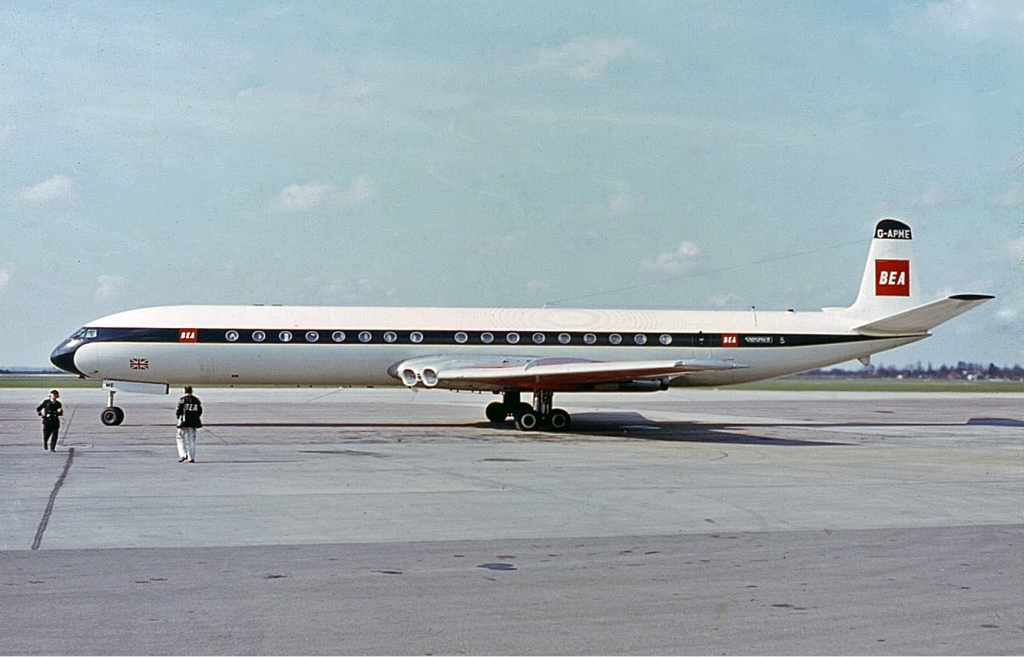
De Havilland Comet of the British European Airways

Dorehill relinquished his RAF commission in November 1945 and began to work for British European Airways (BEA). Flying the Vickers Viking, he took part in the Berlin Airlift in 1948. Afterwards he flew the Vickers Viscount for BEA before transferring to jets, where he flew the Comet and the Trident during a 31-year career with the airline and its successor British Airways. Towards the end of his career he served for a time as a training captain before returning to route flying as a senior captain. He retired from the airline in 1976.

== Personal life ==
Dorehill met Pauline Gamble during the war and in 1943 the two were married in Kensington. They had two sons and two daughters. His first wife died in 1978. He married his second wife, Dora, who in 1989 also predeceased him. In 1989 he married for the third time, to Hazel Payton. As a leisure pursuit Dorehill enjoyed golf throughout his life, achieving his second hole-in-one at the age of 91. Dorehill was a strict vegetarian.

Dorehill was an active participant in a number of veterans organizations, but was reticent to speak about the Augsburg raid. It was not until his later years, when he had become the last living survivor, that he offered to share his story. He did so for a commemorative event at Waddington on the raid's 70th anniversary, and for BBC News. A man with a pleasant disposition, his memories of the events that had occurred that day 70 years earlier were still strong enough to bring tears to his eyes.

In November 2015, Dorehill attended a Luncheon at the Royal Air Force Club in London for his alma mater, Michaelhouse. He was named the 'Khehla', an honour derived from the Zulu word meaning '(wise) old man'. Rising to his feet to accept, Dorehill remembered his formative years in the KwaZulu-Natal Midlands at the place he had not returned to since leaving in 1938 - some 77 years prior. He confessed to not having returned since leaving, but added that not a day had passed that he did not remember his School with fondness and gratitude. He said it had provided him the character and fortitude for what was to come. He then wept. Dorehill passed away seven months later.

== Awards ==
- Distinguished Flying Cross 28 April 1942
- Bar to Distinguished Flying Cross 29 February 1944 (Note: Citation reads: This officer has participated in a large number of sorties, involving attacks on most of the heavily defended targets in Germany. Recently he took part in an attack on Berlin. Before reaching the city his aircraft was attacked by a fighter. Flight Lieutenant Dorehill succeeded in evading the attacker but the bomber had been repeatedly hit by cannon fire, which damaged the fuselage and the tail plane and also put the hydraulic system out of action. Despite this, Flight Lieutenant Dorehill continued to the target which he bombed successfully. On return to base he effected a masterly crash-landing. He displayed great skill, courage and determination throughout. The second DFC was awarded as a bar for the ribbon of the first DFC.)
- Distinguished Service Order 14 July 1944 (Note: Citation reads: This officer has completed a second tour of operations during which he has attacked Berlin on 7 occasions. He has displayed outstanding skill, courage and devotion to duty and his determination to press home his attacks has won him much success. His record has been most impressive.)
