= Bombing of Augsburg in World War II =

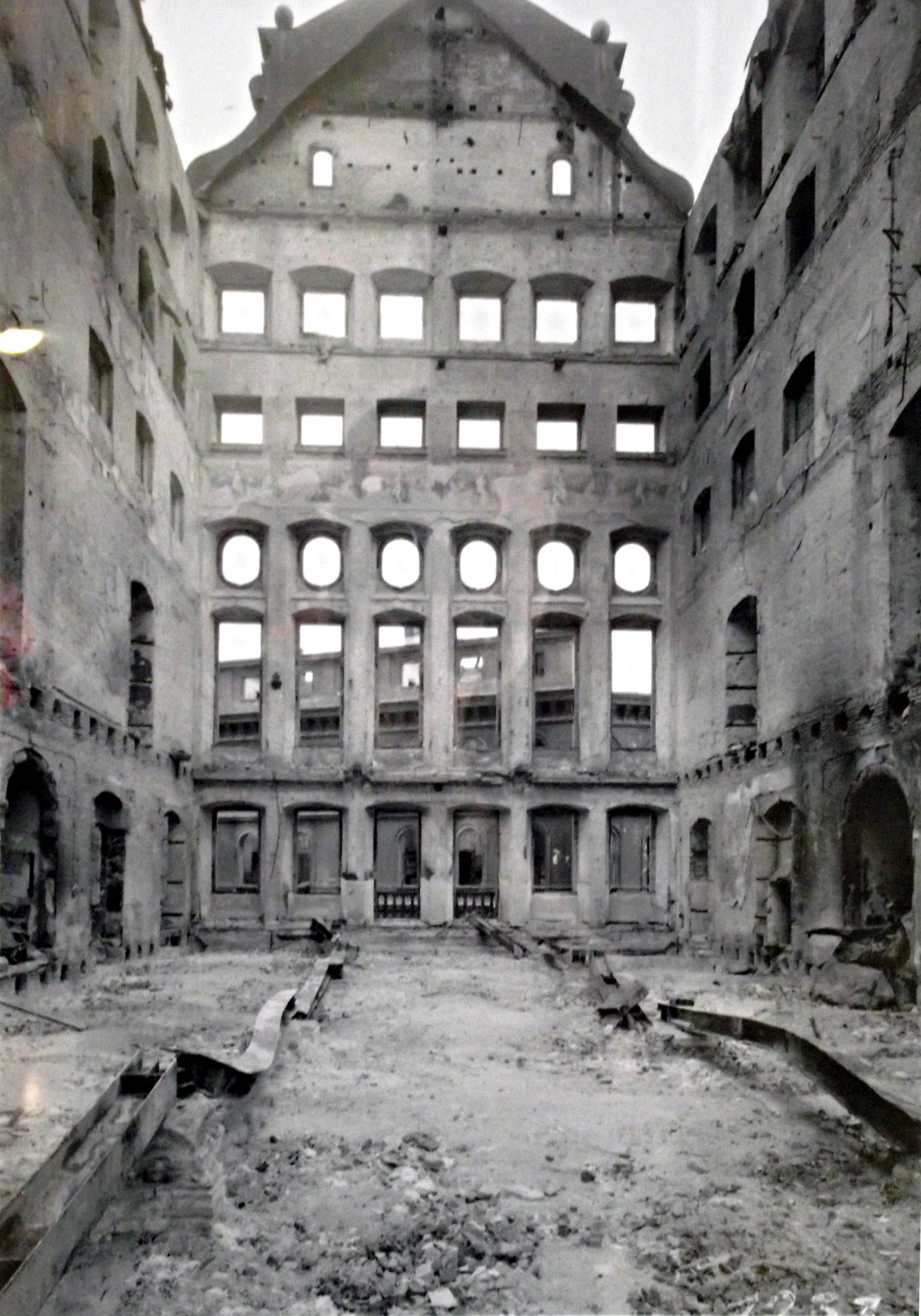
Interior of Augsburg Town Hall after the 25–26 February 1944 bombing

The bombing of Augsburg in World War II included two British RAF and one USAAF bombing raids against the German city of Augsburg on 17 April 1942 and 25/26 February 1944.

== 1942 raid: Operation "Margin" ==
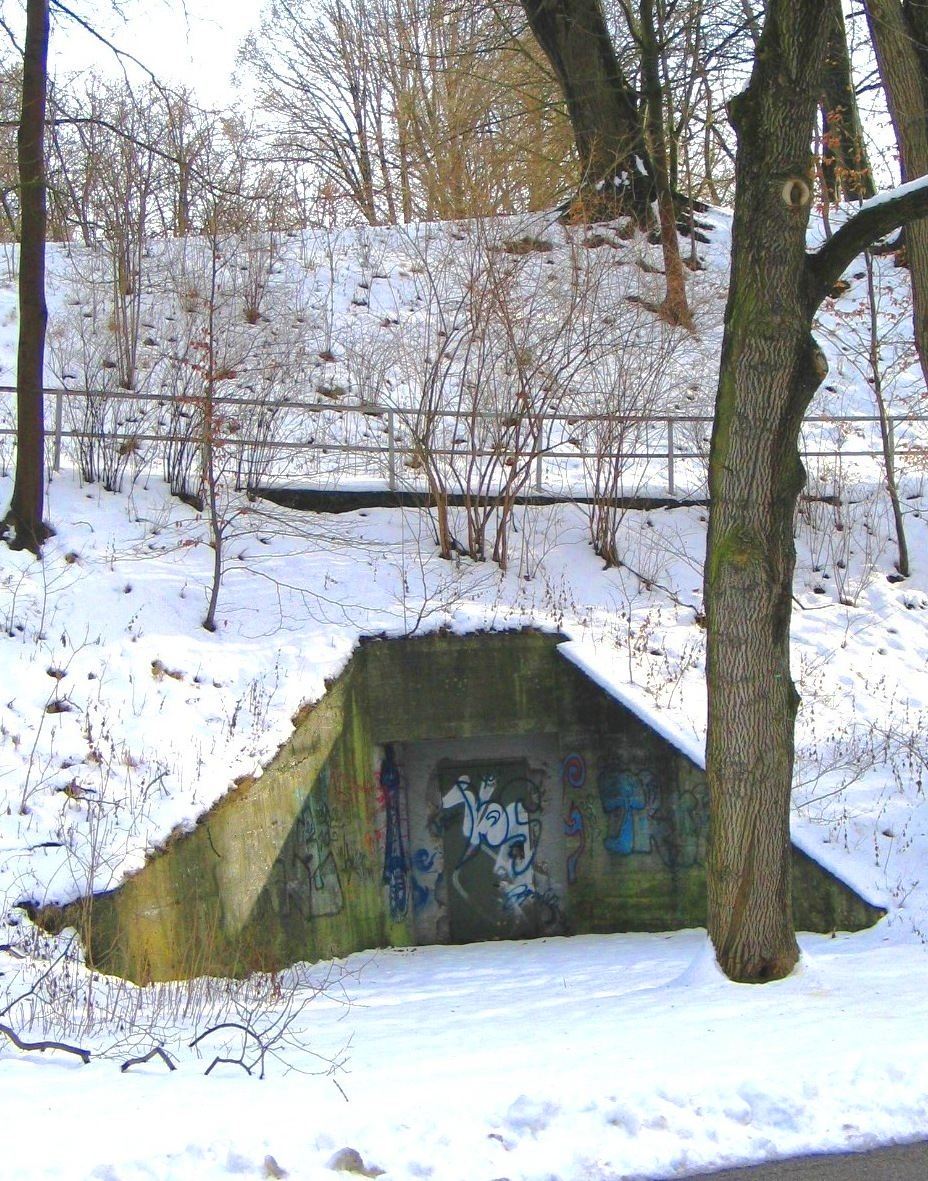
Bomb shelter in Wittelsbacherpark

In April 1942 RAF Bomber Command targeted the MAN U-boat diesel engine factory at Augsburg in Operation Margin. They hoped to take advantage of the capabilities of the new Avro Lancaster. The target was a long distance inside Germany, and a night-time attack would not have been as accurate, so the plan was to attack by day and cross enemy territory at low level. The bomber force was drawn from No. 44 (Rhodesia) Squadron at RAF Waddington and No. 97 Squadron at RAF Woodhall Spa. Each provided a flight of six aircraft. They practised low flying for a week. Thirty Douglas Boston medium bombers and a large Fighter Command effort were dispatched to targets in Northern France intending to draw off German fighters. One Boston was lost in these diversionary activities.

Flying at around 50 ft (15 m), the bombers crossed France but the aircraft of 44 Squadron, under Squadron Leader John Dering Nettleton, flew close by an airfield of II Gruppe/Jagdgeschwader 2. German fighters coming in to land set off in pursuit and shot down four Lancasters. The two remaining bombers flew on and attacked the target with four 1,000 lb (450 kg) bombs each. One was hit by flak and crash-landed with the loss of three of the crew. The other, Nettleton's, flew back. The second six, from 97 Squadron, attacked shortly after in two sections of three. The first attacked at roof height, flying lower after dropping their load to evade flak on the way out but one was hit and crashed exploding. Of the last three aircraft, two were hit and caught fire. One exploded after completing the attack, the others had also completed the bomb run and were able to return home. In the course of the raid, seven of the 12 Lancasters had been shot down with the loss of 49 crewmen, 37 killed and 12 taken prisoner. Seven bombers were claimed by Hpt. Walter Oesau (2), Fw. Otto Pohl (2), Fw. Alexander Bleymüller, Hptm. Karl-Heinz Greisert and Fw. Ernst Bosseckert.

Only two of the first formation of Lancasters dropped their bombs on the factory. Five of the next dropped their bombs. After attacking the surviving Lancasters flew home at higher level under cover of darkness. Squadron Leader Nettleton returned in a badly damaged aircraft, landing near Blackpool. For his outstanding determination and leadership, Nettleton, who had nursed his crippled Lancaster aircraft back to England, would be awarded the Victoria Cross later that same month. Many of the other officers and men who had survived the mission received recognition with the award of Distinguished Service Orders, Distinguished Flying Crosses and Distinguished Flying Medals.

The operation had propaganda value to the British public (having proved that Bomber Command could reach distant targets within Germany). However, Lord Selborne, the Minister of Economic Warfare, was infuriated that the target had not been one of those specified by his Ministry for attack. Post-war analysis indicated the damage inflicted on the enemy was minor; five of the bombs dropped had failed to explode. Eight machine tools were destroyed out of a total of 2,700, and five cranes out of 558. Courageous men and valuable aircraft had been lost although Bomber Command had already learned not to send unescorted bombers on such sorties. Another lesson was that the Lancaster bomber's rifle-calibre machine guns had proved quite inadequate against enemy fighters that were fitted with self-sealing fuel tanks.

== 1944 ==
In a final Big Week mission (#235), the Eighth Air Force bombed the Augsburg Messerschmitt works during the day on 25 February 1944. That night (25/26 February 1944), RAF Bomber Command followed with 594 aircraft and destroyed large parts of the centre of Augsburg. 21 RAF aircraft, 3.6% of the force was lost (at least four due to collision).

The last bombings killed 730 people and injured 1,335; 85,000 were left homeless, and nearly a quarter of all homes had been destroyed. There were 246 "large or medium sized" and 820 small fires. Due to the frozen hydrants and water surfaces (the temperature was minus 18 degrees Celsius) fire fighting was difficult.

== After World War II ==
During the Christmas holiday of 2016, 50,000 Augsburg residents were evacuated to remove a 3.8 tonne dud bomb.

== See also ==
- Strategic bombing during World War II
- List of strategic bombing over Germany in World War II

== References and notes ==
Notes

Bibliography

- Bowman, Martin E Legend of the Lancasters 2009, Pen and Sword Aviation, Barnsley
