= John Seymour Sherwood =

British bomber pilot

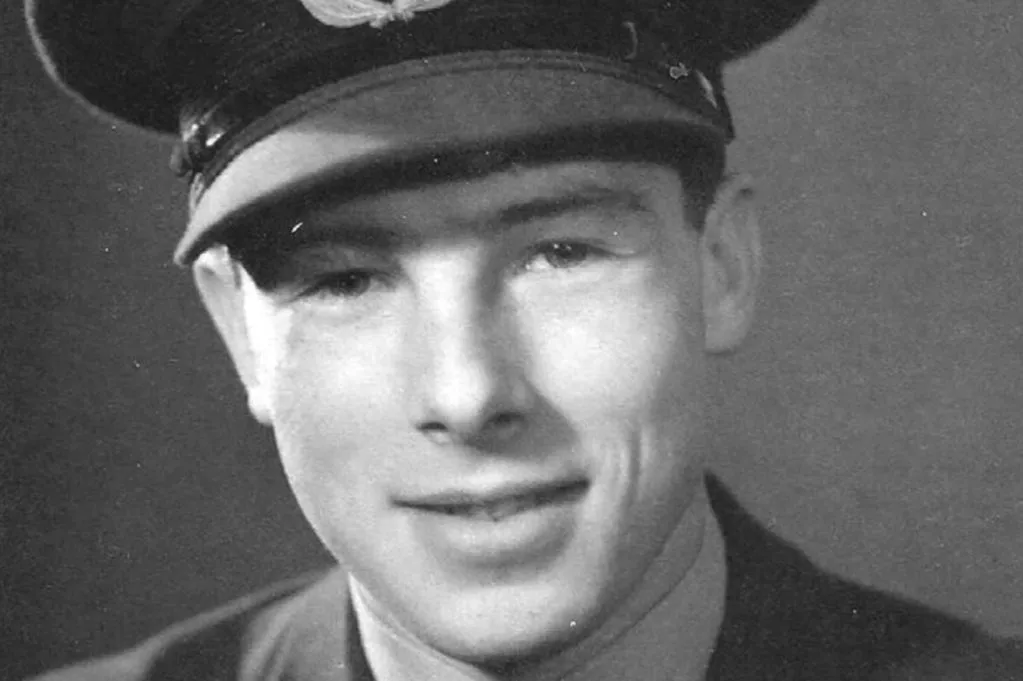
- Born: 16 March 1918; Suez, Egypt
- Died: 1973 (aged 54–55)
- Military career
- Allegiance: United Kingdom
- Branch: Royal Air Force
- Rank: Squadron leader
- Nickname: Flap
- Commands: No. 76 Squadron RAF; No. 97 Squadron RAF; No. 144 Squadron RAF
- Known for: British anti-invasion preparations of the Second World War: Augsburg raid
- Conflicts: World War II
- Awards: Distinguished Flying Cross (1940); Bar to the DFC (1942); Mentioned in dispatches (1942); Distinguished Service Order (1942)

John Seymour Sherwood, also known as Flap (16 March 1918 - 1973) was a British Royal Air Force fighter and bomber pilot during the Second World War.

He was awarded the Distinguished Flying Cross in 1940 for his early combat achievements, and the Distinguished Service Order in 1942 for his leadership in the Augsburg raid against a key German U-boat engine plant. During that mission, Sherwood’s Avro Lancaster was hit by anti-aircraft warfare and crashed near the target, killing six of the seven crew members. As the sole survivor, he was captured and held as a prisoner of war at Stalag Luft III, where he was a witness to the events surrounding the Great Escape.

== Early life and education ==
John Seymour Sherwood was born on 18 March 1918 in Suez, Egypt, the eldest of two sons of Charles Alexander Sherwood, Eastern Telegraph Company Cable ship CS Cambria's chief officer, and his wife Violet Anna Rose (née Pertwee), a nurse. At the age of ten, he moved to Kingston-upon-Thames, England, with his mother and brother.

Sherwood was commissioned into the Royal Air Force in 1936 after completing his education at a British school. The following year he was appointed pilot officer. In 1939 he was promoted to flying officer.

== World War II ==
During World War II Sherwood served with No. 144 Squadron RAF and later with No. 97 Squadron RAF, based at RAF Coningsby. On 17 April 1942, he departed from RAF Woodhall Spa in Lincolnshire and led a formation on a mission across German-occupied Europe. He successfully guided all his aircraft directly to their target in the Augsburg raid; the Maschinenfabrik Augsburg-Nürnberg (MAN) U-boat engine plant in Augsburg. His Avro Lancaster was destroyed by anti-aircraft warfare near target and crashed nearby, killing six of the seven crew. The only survivor of that crash Sherwood was subsequently imprisoned at Dulag Luft, Stalag Luft III in Sagan, and Belaria. While imprisoned he witnessed the Great Escape and subsequent Stalag Luft III murders.

== Awards ==
Serving as flight lieutenant with No. 144 Squadron RAF Sherwood was awarded the Distinguished Flying Cross in 1940. In January 1942 he received the Bar to the DFC. Though recommended for a Victoria Cross, he was awarded the Distinguished Service Order in June 1942.

The citation reads as follows:

CITATION

On the 17th April, 1942, Squadron Leader Sherwood was the leader of one of two formations of 6 Lancaster bombers detailed to deliver a low level attack in daylight on the diesel engine factory at Augsburg. He led the formation at very low level across 600 miles of enemy territory. On approaching the target heavy and accurate anti-aircraft fire was encountered. Nevertheless, showing fine daring and coolness, Squadron Leader Sherwood pressed home the attack at a very low level scoring hits on the factory with his bombs. His aircraft was then hit by anti-aircraft fire and set alight. He continued, however, to lead his section away from the target until his aircraft became uncontrollable. By his extreme devotion to duty Squadron Leader Sherwood contributed much towards the success of the operation and continued his daring leadership until his aircraft1 could no longer be flown. His conspicuous bravery on this occasion crowned along and distinguished career in the service of his country.

== Death ==
Sherwood died from cancer in 1973.

== Bibliography ==
- Sherwood, Gerald (2021). Bomber Command Pilot: From the Battle of Britain to the Augsburg Raid: The Unique Story of Wing Commander J S Sherwood DSO, DFC. Air World. ISBN 978-1-3990-1252-2.
