= List of accidents and incidents involving the Avro Lincoln =

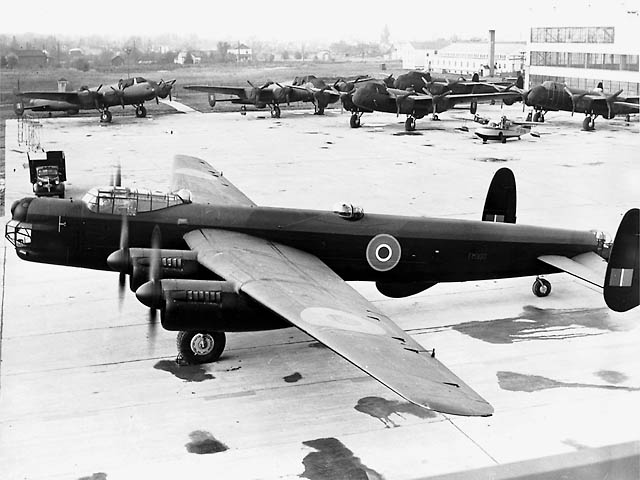

List of accidents and incidents involving the Avro Lincoln four-engined heavy-bomber and later used for signals intelligence, radar research and as an engine test bed.

== 1940s ==
1946

- 20 February 1946 RF385 of No. 57 Squadron RAF lost control in cloud and crashed near Barsby, Leicestershire, seven killed.
- 28 August 1946 RF441 of No. 61 Squadron RAF landing gear collapses while taxiing at RAF Waddington.
- 29 August 1946 RF485 of No. 97 Squadron RAF caught fire in a hangar at RAF Coningsby.
- 8 November 1946 RE285 of the Air Torpedo Development Unit was abandoned over Chirton, Wiltshire at night when the fuel was exhausted.

1947

- 24 February 1947 RF479 of No. 57 Squadron RAF hit snowbank on take-off. The landing gear collapsed on landing at RAF Woodbridge.
- 23 May 1947 RE365 of No. 61 Squadron RAF crashed on approach to RAF Waddington, two killed.
- 24 September 1947 RE373 of No. 97 Squadron RAF dived into the ground near Caistor, Norfolk, nine killed.
- 21 October 1947 RF467 of No. 83 Squadron RAF landing gear collapsed on landing at RAF Hemswell.

1948

- 26 January 1948 RE364 of the Empire Air Navigation School caught fire while being refuelled at RAF Shawbury, not repaired.
- 30 April 1948 RF474 of No. 9 Squadron RAF broke up in cloud and crashed near Istres, France, 11 killed.
- 2 July 1948 RF560 of the Aeroplane and Armament Experimental Establishment (A&AEE) spun into the ground near RAF Boscombe Down, four killed.
- 9 July 1948 RF518 of No. 61 Squadron RAF stalled on landing when pilot's seat collapsed at RAF Wittering.
- 31 August 1948 RF419 of No. 44 Squadron RAF flew into the ground while overshooting at RAF Wyton.
- 19 October 1948 RF475 of No. 100 Squadron RAF landing gear collapsed on take-off from RAF Hemswell.
- 10 November 1948 RF440 of No. 138 Squadron RAF crashed during an overshoot at Shallufa, Egypt and destroyed by fire.
- 10 November 1948 SX924 of WEE RCAF ditched into Watson Lake, Yukon, after experiencing fuel flow problems.

1949

- 3 February 1949 RE338 of No. 230 Operational Conversion Unit RAF had the landing gear collapse on landing at RAF Lindholme.
- 1 April 1949 RF359 of No. 61 Squadron RAF had the landing gear collapse on landing at Merignac, France.
- 7 April 1949 RE370 of No. 61 Squadron RAF had the landing gear collapse on landing at Shallufa, Egypt.
- 15 July 1949 RF471 of No. 61 Squadron RAF crashed four miles (6.4 km) from RAF Waddington, reason unknown, seven killed.
- 26 September 1949 RE374 of No. 57 Squadron RAF and RF407 of No. 61 Squadron RAF collide and crash over Shropshire, seven on each aircraft killed.
- 29 September 1949 SX990 of No. 35 Squadron RAF crashed into trees one mile (1.6 km) south of Shippea Hill, Suffolk, on a night approach to RAF Mildenhall.
- 1 November 1949 RF469 of No. 57 Squadron RAF swung on take-off at Shallufa, Egypt and the landing gear collapsed.
- 24 November 1949 RF470 of No. 57 Squadron RAF swung on overshoot at RAF Waddington.

== 1950s ==
1950

- 15 March 1950 RF472 of No. 100 Squadron RAF overshot on landing at night at RAF Hemswell and crashed, five killed.
- 15 March 1950 RF511 of No. 230 Operational Conversion Unit RAF flew into a mountain near Bethesda, Caernarvon, Wales, six killed.
- 14 April 1950 RE232 of the Aeroplane and Armament Experimental Establishment had the landing gear collapse on take-off at Silloth.
- 20 April 1950 RF408 of No. 230 Operational Conversion Unit RAF landed with wheels-up during an overshoot at RAF Scampton.
- 11 May 1950 SX957 of No. 148 Squadron RAF collided with a de Havilland Vampire (VZ188) during a dummy attack 12 miles (19 km) East-North-East of Fayid, Egypt, ten killed in Lincoln and one in Vampire.
- 27 June 1950 RF383 of No. 100 Squadron RAF was hit by RF498 while parked at RAF Tengah and damaged beyond repair.
- 12 December 1950 RE344 of No. 12 Squadron RAF crashed on landing at RAF Binbrook.

1951

- 18 January 1951 RA712 of No. 617 Squadron RAF undershot on landing at RAF Binbrook and hit two parked Lincolns, RF537 and SX958, one killed.
- 22 January 1951RA717 of No. 230 Operational Conversion Unit RAF flew into ground 2.5 miles (4.0 km) North-East of RAF Scampton during a beam approach.
- 5 February 1951 SX981 of No. 101 Squadron RAF was abandoned near Driffield following an engine fire.
- 24 April 1951 RA682 of No. 230 Operational Conversion Unit RAF swung on landing at RAF Scampton and landing gear collapsed.
- 14 July 1951 RA692 of No. 230 Operational Conversion Unit RAF flew into the ground 3 miles (4.8 km) East-North-East of RAF Scampton during a night approach, seven killed.
- 24 August 1951 RA679 of No. 12 Squadron RAF overshot on landing at RAF Binbrook and landing gear collapsed.
- 22 September 1951 RE302 of the Royal Air Force Technical College had the landing gear collapse on landing at RAF Marham.
- 26 September 1951 RA689 of No. 9 Squadron RAF had a collapsed landing gear on landing as Shallufa, Egypt.
- 10 October 1951 RE342 of No. 7 Squadron RAF flew into the ground on approach to RAF Upwood.
- 17 November 1951 RF337 of the Central Signals Establishment had engine failure on take-off at RAF Gibraltar and flew into the sea.
- 20 November 1951 RF353 of No. 230 Operational Conversion Unit RAF had the landing gear collapse on landing at RAF Scampton.
- 26 November 1951 RF500 of the Central Gunnery School crashed on approach to RAF Leconfield, two killed.
- 26 November 1951 SX939 of No. 100 Squadron RAF was overstressed and relegated to ground training duties.
- 1 December 1951 RF567 of No. 230 Operational Conversion Unit RAF hit a hangar at RAF Scampton during an overshoot, two killed.
- 20 December 1951 SX991 of the Radar Research Flight flew into the ground on approach to RAF Benson.

1952

- 22 January 1952 RE413 of No. 97 Squadron RAF crashed on approach to RAF Marham, Norfolk.
- 25 February 1952 SX928 of No. 230 Operational Conversion Unit RAF crashed near RAF Scampton after an overshoot in fog.
- 23 December 1952 RE424 of No. 61 Squadron RAF crashed at Westfield Farm, Lincolnshire on approach to RAF Waddington.
- 19 December 1952 RF453 of No. 7 Squadron RAF was damaged beyond repair after it crash-landed near Upwood following an engine fire on take-off.

1953

- 12 March 1953 RF531 of the Central Gunnery School was shot down by a Soviet fighter at Boizenberg in the Soviet Zone of Germany, seven killed.
- 17 December 1953 RF349 of No. 49 Squadron RAF stalled on take-off at Eastleigh, Kenya and landing gear collapsed.

1954

- 20 January 1954 RF335 of No. 100 Squadron RAF landing gear collapsed on take off at Eastleigh, Kenya.
- 22 March 1954 RE297 of No. 61 Squadron RAF flew into high ground in Kenya, five killed.

1955

- 9 April 1955 A73-64 of No. 10 Squadron RAAF crashed approximately 50m below the summit of Mount Superbus, west of Brisbane, Australia, while on a medical evacuation flight for a critically ill two-day-old baby girl from Townsville to Brisbane. Four crew, the baby and a nurse were killed. The aircraft was off course at night in bad weather.
- 26 June 1955 WD131 of No. 199 Squadron RAF collided with a USAF F-86D over Germany, six killed.
- 9 August 1955 RF574 of No. 83 Squadron RAF the landing gear was retracted instead of flaps during landing at RAF Hemswell.

1956

- 7 May 1956 RA673 of the Bomber Command Bombing School was damaged beyond repair when it hit the sea wall on approach to RAF Thorney Island.
- 28 September 1956 RA657 of No. 199 Squadron RAF bounced on landing at RAF Turnhouse, Scotland and ended up in a ditch.

1957

- 20 December 1957 RF557 of No. 199 Squadron RAF was damaged beyond repair on landing at RAF Hemswell.

1958

- 13 November 1958 SX934 of the Royal Air Force Flying College, landing gear collapsed on landing at RAF Manby.

== 1960s ==
1961

- 22 March 1961 WD144 of the Royal Air Force Flying College landed with wheels up at RAF Manby.
