= Royal Air Force daylight raids, 1940–1944 =

A strategic bombing campaign was waged by RAF Bomber Command against Nazi Germany and other Axis powers in Europe during the Second World War. Relatively few of these were daylight operations and the vast majority of these sorties were flown at night. After suffering heavy losses attempting daylight bombing raids over the Heligoland islands in the North Sea and over France during the first half of 1940, Bomber Command had largely withdrawn its aircraft from daylight attacks. Bomber Command, however, was still willing to risk aircraft to attack targets in daylight on occasion. These were usually targets that required highly precise delivery of bombs, such as warships or small factories. Industries located in occupied territories were another group of targets that required a high degree of accuracy when attacked to avoid casualties among the civilians of the occupied country.

In addition, after winning the Battle of Britain, Fighter Command went over onto the offensive. Fighter Command conducted provocative missions in what they termed the "Circus" operations. These missions were various fighter sweeps over northern France and Belgium conducted to engage the Luftwaffe. The Ramrod type raid was a Circus offensive operation where a small number of bombers were escorted to a target with a very large fighter escort. Bomber Command supported the effort by assigning No. 2 Group to work with Fighter Command. No. 2 Group squadrons were equipped with faster, more manoeuvrable medium bombers, and as a group it was set apart for conducting daylight raids against near targets. Except for occasional diversionary efforts, No. 2 Group did not participate in the Bomber Offensive over Germany.

== Missions ==
Name of mission	Squadrons involved	Date of mission	Target	Location of target	Objective
Operation Margin; Augsburg Raid	44 Squadron; 97 Squadron	17 April 1942	MAN plant	Augsburg, southern Germany	Destroy the MAN U-boat diesel engine factory
Operation Pandemonium	218 Squadron; 15 Squadron	16 July 1942	Lubecker Flender Werk AG plant	Lübeck, Germany	Destroy the U-boat assembly plant
Oslo Raid	No. 105 Squadron	25 September 1942	Oslo Gestapo headquarters	Oslo, Norway	Destroy the Gestapo headquarters in Oslo
Operation Robinson	No. 5 Group	17 October 1942	Schneider Works	Le Creusot in south central France	Destroy the Schneider steel and armaments plant
Operation Oyster	No. 2 Group	6 December 1942	Philips Electrical Works	Eindhoven, the Netherlands	Destroy the Philips electronics factory and radar research centre in Eindhoven
Ramrod No. 16	No. 107 Squadron RAF; 487 (RNZAF) Squadron (plus 5 fighter squadrons)	3 May 1943	Steelworks	IJmuiden, the Netherlands	Together with diversion raid attack on the Hemweg power station near Amsterdam.
Operation Jericho	No. 140 Wing; 21 Squadron RAF, 464 Squadron RAAF and 487 Squadron RNZAF.	18 February 1944	Amiens Gestapo Prison	Amiens, France	Breach the prison walls to allow French resistance fighters to escape

After the Allied invasion of the continent Allied control of the airspace over Europe was widespread, and daylight raids became much more common for Bomber Command crews. These later missions are not included in the above list.

== Bibliography ==
- Ashworth, Chris (1995). RAF Bomber Command 1936–1968. Somerset: Haynes. ISBN 1-85260-308-9.
- Maynard, John (1996). Bennett and the Pathfinders. London: Arms and Armour. ISBN 978-1-85409-258-8.
- Murray, Williamson (1989) [1983], Strategy for Defeat: The Luftwaffe, 1933–1945, Maxwell Air Force Base, Ala.: Air University Press, ISBN 978-0-933852-45-7 – via Hyperwar Foundation
