= John Nettleton =

John Nettleton may refer to:

- John Nettleton (actor) (1929–2023), British actor
- John Dering Nettleton, South Africa recipient of the Victoria Cross
