= Augsburg raid =

WWII bombing operation by the Royal Air Force

Operation Margin
- Part of Second World War
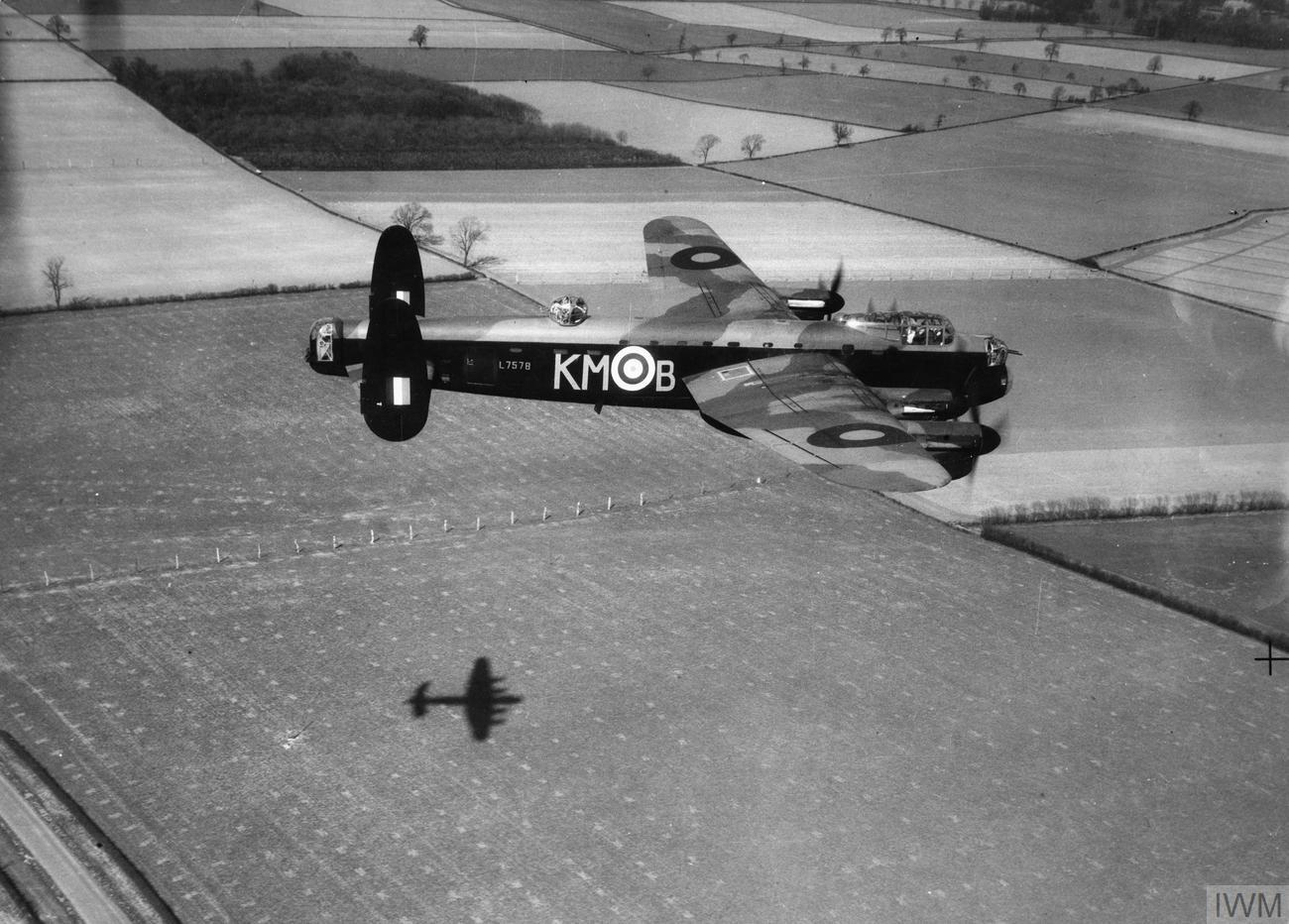
- Nettleton over England on his final practice run for the Augsburg raid
Date	17 April 1942
Location	Augsburg, Bavaria

Belligerents
United Kingdom	(Nazi Germany) Germany

Commanders and leaders
Sq. Ldr. John D. Nettleton	

Strength
12 Lancaster bombers	

Casualties and losses
7 aircraft shot down; 5 aircraft badly damaged	
- No significant damage inflicted upon the MAN U-boat engine plant.

The Augsburg Raid, also referred to as Operation Margin, was an attack by the Royal Air Force (RAF) on the Maschinenfabrik Augsburg-Nürnberg (MAN) U-boat engine plant in Augsburg during the daylight hours of 17 April 1942. It was carried out by No. 44 (Rhodesia) Squadron and No. 97 Squadron, both of which were equipped with the new Avro Lancaster. The speed of the Lancaster and its large bombload capacity gave reason for optimism that the raid might succeed. It was the first of the attacks upon German industry in Augsburg.

== Background ==
For Arthur Harris, RAF Bomber Command's commander-in-chief, the Augsburg attack was a gamble. He had assumed command some two months earlier, and had inherited a bankrupt concern that was on the ropes. Bomber Command had been attacking German industry at night for two years, and had little to show for it. Losses had been significant. The strain upon his command was high, and morale among his crews brittle. The costs of the bombing offensive both in terms of personpower and of scarce war materiel was great. A good deal of pressure was upon Harris to release aircraft to help the Royal Navy in the battle of the Atlantic against German U-boats, but he was not prepared to dissipate his strength, preferring to assist in the U-boat war by attacking the U-boats at their bases. The MAN U-boat engine plant in Augsburg presented a different type of opportunity to address the U-boat problem. Harris believed striking this target would show his command was capable, and demonstrate his commitment to the anti-U-boat campaign.

The MAN plant produced half of all the U-boat engines built. Destroying this plant would greatly impede U-boat production. Among the difficulties for Bomber Command was that the factory was a fairly small target. Bomber Command's night raids had not proven to be very accurate thus far. The target did not lend itself to area bombing from large formation attacks; to damage it required accuracy. In addition, the factory was located on the periphery of a city in Bavaria, southern Germany. To reach it would require flying nearly 970 kilometres (600 mi) over enemy occupied territory.

44 Squadron had been working with the Lancaster prototype since its arrival there in September, and had laid sea mines with the aircraft in March to gain some operational experience, but the Lancaster was still unknown to the Germans. This would be the aircraft's first major test. It would be an experimental attack which would take advantage of the speed, range and bombload of the Lancaster.

== Planning ==
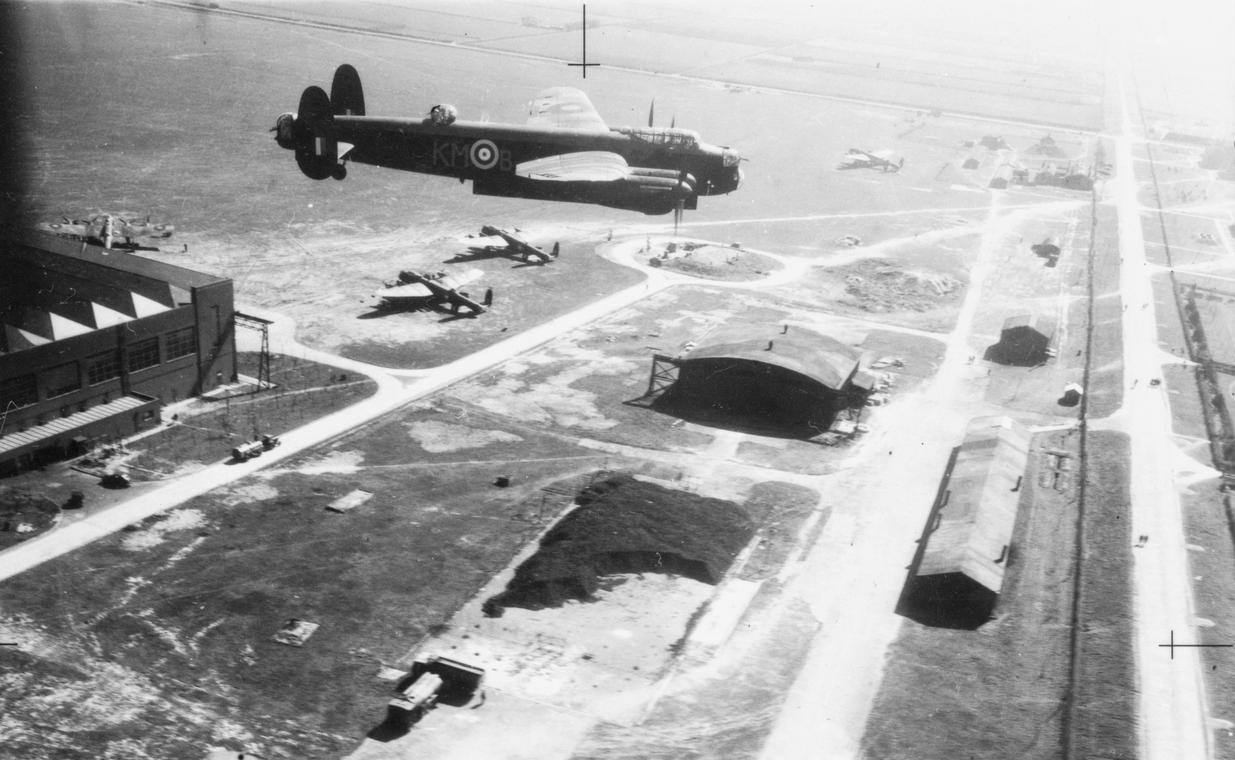
A Lancaster over Waddington airfield at the end of a practice mission

It was hoped that a daylight raid would enable accurate bombing, whilst low level flight would mean that they would be undetected by radar and perhaps achieve surprise. Seven Lancasters from No 44 Squadron and seven from No 97 Squadron would practice long low level flights around Britain and make simulated raids on Inverness, Scotland as preparation for the raid. This training led many of the crews to speculate that their target would be the German naval facility at Kiel.

German fighter bases in the west were concentrated in northern France, Belgium and Germany. British fighter escorts could only protect the bombers for the first 320 kilometres (200 mi) of their journey; afterwards they would be on their own, unprotected. Since the bombers could not be escorted to the target it was decided to try to slip the Lancasters past the German defenders unnoticed. Fighter Command would put on a large diversionary circus operation. A "Ramrod" attack would be carried out by a force of 30 Douglas Boston medium bombers from No. 2 Group’s 88 and 107 Squadrons accompanied by a heavy fighter escort. One group of bombers would attack the port facilities at Cherbourg while a second group attacked the shipyard at Rouen to the east. Meanwhile, large "Rodeo" operations would be conducted to the north in the Pas de Calais. These diversionary attacks were intended to divert the German fighters away from the entry point for the Lancaster force, allowing them to get past the coast defences and into northern France. To avoid radar detection the Lancasters would fly at low altitude all the way to the target.

The bomber force was drawn from the two squadrons which had been issued the Lancaster: No. 44 (Rhodesia) Squadron and No. 97 Squadron. The aircraft would leave in the afternoon, cross northern France to Germany, make their attack as light faded, and then fly a direct return under the cover of darkness. 44 Squadron had the longest experience with the new aircraft, having received the prototype in September 1941. In command of the raid was Squadron Leader John Nettleton of 44 Squadron. A South African, he was an experienced pilot nearing the end of his first tour. 97 Squadron would be led by Squadron Leader John Sherwood.

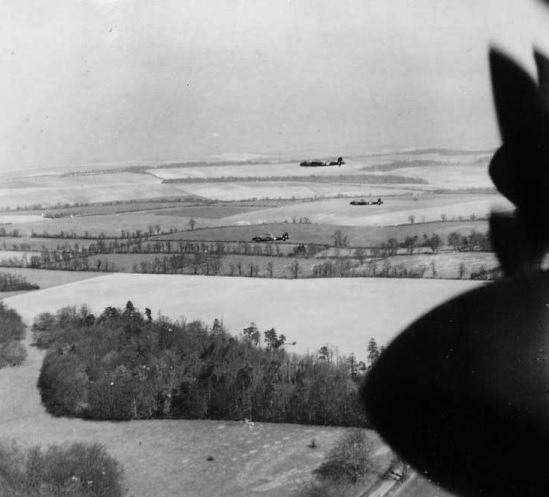
97 Squadron Lancasters over the English countryside on their way to a mock target in Scotland

Bomber Command crews were trained to fly on their own at altitude in trail and during the night. The crews were unfamiliar with low level flying, and they never performed formation flying, which was needed for the aircraft to combine their defensive fire into a formidable shield. A week before the operation the two squadrons were withdrawn from the bomber offensive and began training in low level formation flying. Each squadron would prepare seven Lancaster crews for the mission, but only six aircraft would go, with the seventh prepared as a spare.

For the mission each squadron would fly to the target in two flights of three. The Lancasters would each carry four 450-kilogram (1,000 lb) high explosive bombs. The bombs were to be released just above roof top height of 15 metres (50 ft). They were therefore fused with 11-second delayed action fuses to give the aircraft time to get away from the target area before the bombs went off.

It was the first raid over enemy territory in the Lancaster, though crews from 44 Squadron had been working up in the aircraft for some time. Their previous aircraft had been the Handley Page Hampden medium bomber. The Lancaster was a much bigger, stronger aircraft, and it had much greater defensive fire power. From the 2–3 defensive guns of the Hampden, crews would now be fending off attacks with eight guns in three turrets.

== The raid ==
On 17 April 1942 eight Lancasters in each squadron were prepared for the mission. Their petrol tanks were filled to their maximum capacity of 9,790 litres (2,154 imp gal), and the aircraft were each armed with four 450-kilogram (1,000 lb) bombs. The crews were summoned to the briefing room, airfield security required them to present proof of their identities, and they were brought in to learn the details of the mission they had been training for. The target they were to fly to in daylight was more than 800 kilometres (500 mi) beyond the French coast, and that the target itself was a single building the size of a football pitch. Most of the crews were incredulous, but Patrick Dorehill, Nettleton's flight engineer for the raid, was confident in their new aircraft: "I thought six Lancasters, with all the armament we had, we would be a match for any fighter."

Seven Lancasters of 44 Squadron took off from RAF Waddington in mid-afternoon. Nettleton's force formed into two sections of three aircraft plus a spare and headed south. Ten miles to the east at RAF Woodhall Spa, seven more Lancasters headed south, with Sherwood leading his two flights of three plus a spare. The two groups did not link up, which was not troubling to either group. The sky was clear and the weather warm. The 14 aircraft flew to Selsey Bill, a headland jutting into the Channel just east of Portsmouth that served as a prominent navigation point. At Selsey Bill the back-up Lancasters turned back to their airfield. The remaining aircraft flew on, as they crossed the coast they made a hard 90 degree turn to the left and dropped down to 15 metres (50 ft) to cross over the English Channel. Nettleton's group were ahead flying slightly north of the intended flight path. Sherwood spotted Nettleton's group as they approached the French coast, but Sherwood's navigator confirmed his position and course were correct, and he did not attempt to close the gap. They reached the French coast at Dives sur Mer while the diversionary operation was well underway. Flying under German radar, the 12 aircraft moved inland unnoticed. Nettleton's group passed over Lisieux, where they came under anti-aircraft fire. Some aircraft were hit but no significant damage resulted. A little behind, Sherwood's group kept a flight path a little farther south. As the two "vic" formations of 44 Squadron approached Evreux they passed just to the east of the French airfield at Beaumont-le-Roger, which was in use by Jagdgeschwader 2. Unfortunately, through an error in orders issued to the Boston bombers and their escorts, the diversionary attacks had been run 40 minutes ahead of schedule. The German fighters that had been sent up to engage them were returning to base when Nettleton's aircraft passed by. For a moment the Lancaster crews thought they had gone unnoticed, but several German fighters were seen to snap up their undercarriages and veered in their direction.

As the German fighters caught up they engaged the bombers in a running fight. The Germans had never encountered the four engine bombers, and soon were taking defensive fire from the four .303 machine guns of the tail turret and the paired .303s of the mid-upper turret. Closing the gap, they attacked the trailing vic first. Warrant Officer Crum's Lancaster on the left took machine gun and cannon fire. Bullets shattered the cockpit's canopy, showering Crum and his navigator, Rhodesian Alan Dedman, with shards of Perspex. Dedman could see blood streaming down Crum's face, but when he reached over to help Crum just grinned and waved him away. Some 20 to 30 fighters attempted to chase down Nettleton's six Lancasters. Unfamiliar with the new aircraft type, the attacks were tentative at first, and the Lancasters closed up tighter. Soon the German pilots realized the Lancaster's defensive armament, though formidable, was limited to .303 machine guns and they began to press home their attacks. The Luftwaffe's preferred attack was from above and behind, diving through the formation to escape below, but the Lancasters were too low to allow this tactic. Instead the German pilots attacked the big bombers from the quarter, opening fire with 20 mm cannon at about 640 metres (2,100 ft) before breaking off sharply at 370 metres (1,200 ft), just beyond effective range of the defensive fire. Opposite Crum in the trailing vic Warrant Officer Beckett's aircraft took cannon strikes to his starboard wing root over the fuel tank, and a great ball of orange flame suddenly flared out. The bomber was soon a mass of fire and its nose tipped down. A moment later Beckett's Lancaster hit a clump of trees and disintegrated.

Next, Crum's Lancaster was attacked again. Taking fire, both the rear and mid-upper gunners were wounded. Then the port wing fuel tank was hit and burst into flames. Crum, half blinded by the blood streaming from his face, fought to hold the wings level and ordered Dedman to jettison the bombs (which had not yet been armed). The 450-kilogram (1,000 lb) bombs dropped away, and a few moments later Crum managed to put the crippled aircraft down on her belly. The Lancaster tore across a wheat field and came to a stop. The crew, badly shaken and bruised, evacuated the wreck very quickly, convinced that it was going to explode in flames, but the fire in the wing went out. Crum was under orders not to allow his aircraft to fall into German hands. With an axe from the bomber's escape kit, he cut holes in the fuel tanks and threw a match into the resulting pool of petrol. The wreck was soon completely ablaze. He and his crew then split up into pairs to attempt to escape occupied France along one of the aircrew escape lines through Bordeaux and Spain. However, they were all apprehended by the Germans and spent the rest of the war in Luftwaffe prisoner of war camps.

Flight Lieutenant Sandford's aircraft was the last of the second section. In a bid to shed his pursuers he brought his bomber down to pass under a group of high tension cables. In doing so his right wingtip brushed the ground, causing the aircraft to cart-wheel and then explode. All occupants were killed in the crash.

Now the pursuers moved up to the lead vic of aircraft. Warrant Officer "Dusty" Rhodes, flying to the right and some distance behind Nettleton, was attacked first. His Lancaster was hit by Walter Oesau, an expert (experte) fighter pilot and the commander of Jagdgeschwader 2. The Lancaster was struck in the wing root fuel cells and was soon on fire. The aircraft accelerated forward and moved slightly ahead of the other two bombers in the vic. It then pitched up into a brief, steep climb before winging over sharply and crashing into the ground. It was Oesau's 101st victory.

This left only Nettleton and Garwell. Both aircraft had suffered multiple hits, but no attempt to escape to the south was made. Nettleton was a determined flight leader. Then something unexpected happened. Without warning the enemy fighters suddenly broke off their attacks and turned away. Whether due to lack of fuel or lack of ammunition is not known, but it allowed the two surviving Lancasters to escape. Nettleton's group had one more touch of bad luck as they flew over a German supply depot and faced heavy anti-aircraft fire. However both aircraft came through unscathed, and they were not challenged again until they were over the target.

Meanwhile, to the south Sherwood's group of six Lancasters from 97 Squadron had slipped by unseen. Both groups of aircraft continued south independently. They passed to the west of Paris and then turned east for their long trek across northern France, passing first over Sens. They received the occasional wave from a French person, but otherwise passed through the rest of the country unnoticed. Reaching Sens, they bent their path southeast and headed for the frontier, skirting along the Swiss border till they reached Lake Constance. Here they turned northeast on course for Munich till they came to a large lake known as the Ammersee where they made a hard turn to the north, headed over a rise and came into view of their target, Augsburg.

Their arrival at Augsburg did not go unnoticed. Nettleton's two aircraft arrived first, coming in low over the roof tops. Soon they were met with anti-aircraft fire of great intensity and accuracy. Though fired upon from point blank range they held course and delivered their bombs on the target. Pulling away, Garwell's aircraft was hit in a fuel tank and set afire. Garwell brought it down and crash landed. Three of his crew died in the crash, but Garwell and three others survived.

Shortly after Nettleton's aircraft cleared the target came Sherwood's two flights of three, up to this point unchallenged by the German defenses. Sherwood had brought his formation across nearly 970 kilometres (600 mi) of enemy territory at very low level, arriving directly on time upon the target. The plant was now marked by smoke from the initial attack. Going in at rooftop level in line astern, they released their bombs, then dropped to street level to get under the flak and out of town. Sherwood's aircraft was hit and caught on fire. He continued to lead his section away from the target with one wing well alight until suddenly the aircraft became uncontrollable, dropped a wing, flew straight into the ground and exploded.

In the second group all three pilots saw Sherwood go down before they made their attack. Warrant Officer Mycock's aircraft was hit in his run in and became engulfed in flames, but in a display of uncommon bravery and devotion to his task he pressed on and delivered his bombs on the target just before his aircraft exploded, killing everyone aboard. Flying Officer Deverill's aircraft was also hit and set afire. He released his bombs on the target as well. Soon after his crew controlled the fire, but his aircraft had suffered a 3-metre (10 ft) gash along its fuselage. He was able to form up with another 97 Squadron aircraft as darkness fell and the two returned to base together.

The 97 Squadron aircraft made it back to Woodhall Spa before Nettleton got to Waddington. Nettleton had returned in a badly damaged aircraft. Finally breaking radio silence they requested navigational assistance and learned they had flown out over the Irish Sea. Turning around they landed at Squire's Gate aerodrome, near Blackpool in North West England. Upon landing he telephoned Waddington to report on the mission and ask about survivors. Five aircraft had made it back. Of the 85 crewmen who had set out that afternoon, 49 were listed as missing.

== Aftermath ==
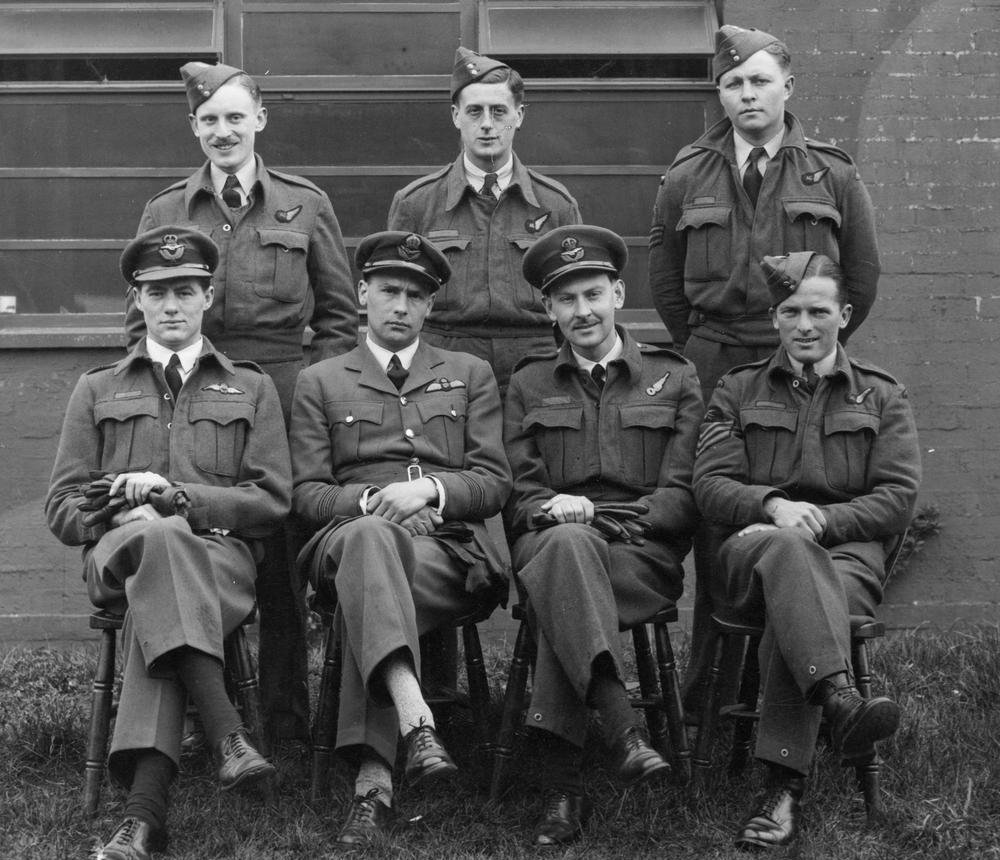
Nettleton and crew sit for a portrait after surviving the Augsburg raid. Nettleton is seated, second from left.

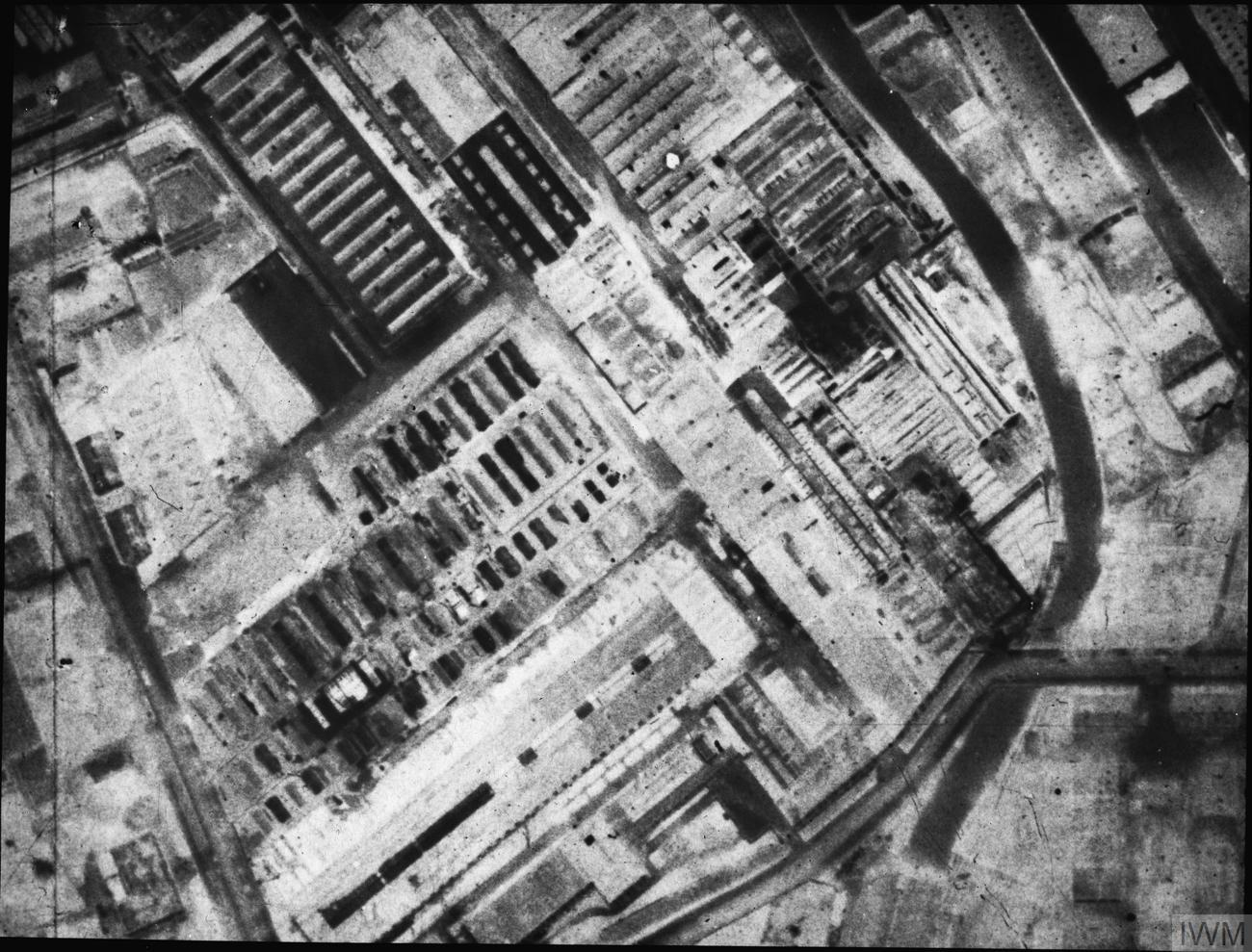
Post mission photo-reconnaissance image of the MAN factory

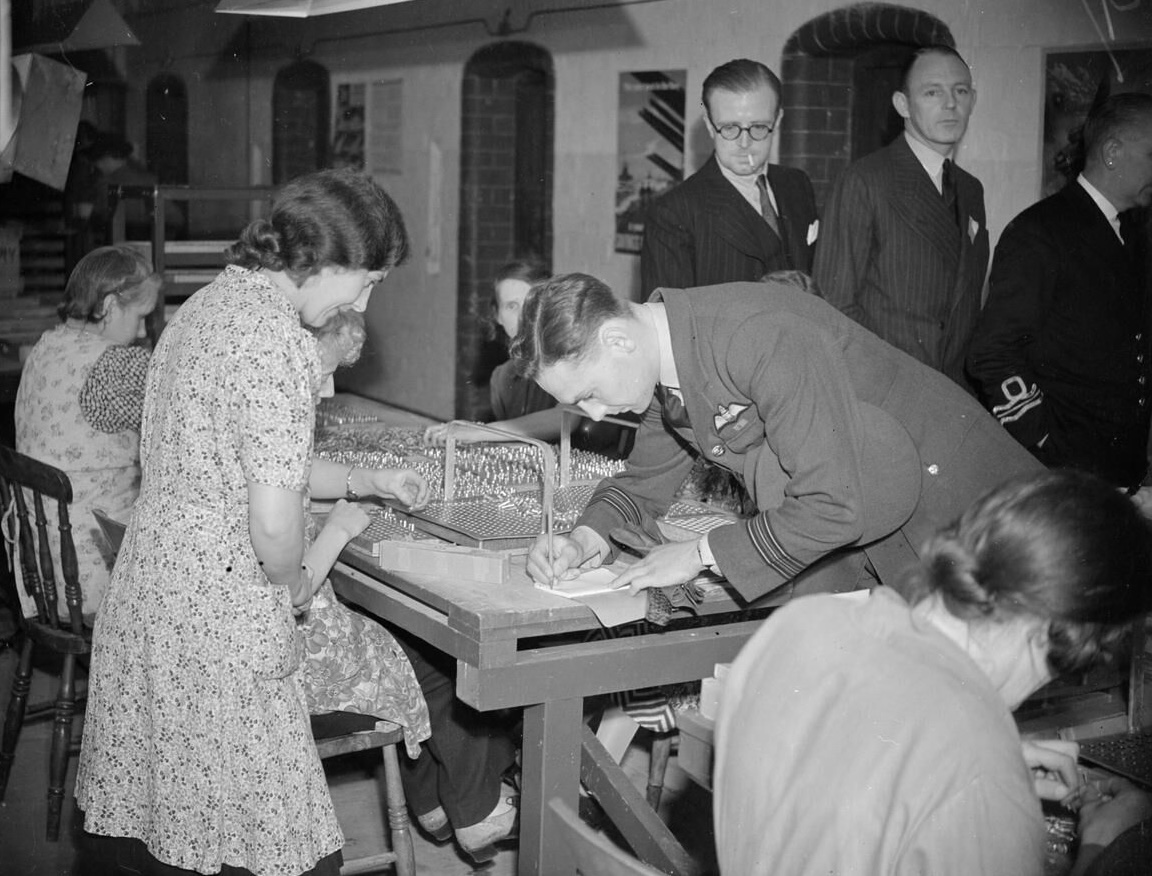
Nettleton signing an autograph for a factory worker

The raid had not ended well. Four of the Lancasters in the 44 Squadron group were shot down over northern France, and another was lost over the target. Flak defenses at Augsburg claimed two more aircraft from 97 Squadron. Only five aircraft returned from the raid, a 58% loss rate. Of the five that got back, one was damaged beyond repair and had to be written off, while the others had all suffered significant damage as well. Surviving crews felt numb over the losses. They were given three days leave to help get their feet back under them. Nettleton then took his crew up to the Air Fighting Development Unit at Duxford to try to work out evasive tactics that could be used in the event of future fighter interceptions.

The Prime minister, Winston Churchill, said:

We must plainly regard the attack of the Lancasters on the U-boat engine factory at Augsburg as an outstanding achievement of the Royal Air Force. Undeterred by heavy losses at the outset, 44 and 97 Squadrons pierced and struck a vital point with deadly precision in broad daylight. Pray convey the thanks of His Majesty’s Government to the officers and men who accomplished this memorial feat of arms in which no life was lost in vain.

Harris recommended both Nettleton and Sherwood for the Victoria Cross (VC). Nettleton was gazetted for the award on 24 April 1942. He was the first South African of the war to win the VC. The Air Ministry declined to award Sherwood the VC, though they did offer to award him the Distinguished Service Order if it was discovered he had survived. To everyone's surprise, he had. When his aircraft hit the ground the pilot seat broke from its mounting and was thrown from the wreckage. Sherwood was still strapped in, and was the sole survivor from the crash. Many other officers and men who had survived the mission were awarded recognitions as well.

The raid was hailed by the Ministry of Information as a triumph, and was given widespread publicity in Britain. The surviving crews were put to use to encourage morale for the war effort. This did not set well with Nettleton, who felt responsible for the loss of so many crews, but he did what the government asked of him.

Though the MAN plant had been hit, its U-boat engine production continued. The crews believed they had destroyed their target, as they had seen their bombs strike the plant. In fact they had placed 17 450-kilogram (1,000 lb) bombs on the main tool shop, causing significant damage to the roof and walls, but the machine tools themselves were largely still functional. Only 12 of the 17 bombs that struck the tool shop detonated. The 29% failure rate was somewhat higher than the usual 20% failure rate that was typical of UK-produced high explosive bombs. The bombing resulted in significant structural damage to the building housing the tool shop, but few of the tools inside were damaged. U-boat engine production continued without apparent disruption.

The Augsburg mission was the longest low level penetration raid ever undertaken during the Second World War. However, a loss rate of 58% was clearly unsustainable. The results indicated daylight attacks against defended targets were no more practical in 1942 than they had been in 1940. The failure of the raid was an impetus for Bomber Command to press forward with the formation of the Air Ministry's proposed Target Finding Force. In addition, Bomber Command continued to attempt occasional daylight raids against small, high value targets.

Aviation historian Robert Owen has described the Augsburg Raid as one of the most audacious attacks ever mounted. In terms of airmanship, courage, determination and skill, he considers the raid as one of Bomber Command's best examples.

== Sources ==
- Ashworth, Chris (1995). RAF Bomber Command 1936-1968. Somerset, UK: Haynes Publishing. ISBN 1-85260-308-9.
- Bowman, Martin W (2016) [2015]. Nachtjagd, Defenders of the Reich 1940-1943. Barnsley, South Yorkshire: Pen & Sword Aviation.
- Currie, Jack (1987). The Augsburg raid: the story of one of the most dramatic and dangerous raids ever mounted by RAF Bomber Command. London: Goodall Publications.
- Jackson, Robert (2005). Hit & run: daring air attacks in World War II. Barnsley: Pen & Sword Aviation.
- Longmate, Norman (1983). The Bombers: The RAF offensive against Germany 1939–1945. London: Hutchinson. ISBN 0-09-151580-7.
- Mahaddie, T.G. (1989). Hamish: the memoirs of Group Captain T.G. Mahaddie DSO, DFC, AFC, CZMC, CENG, FRAeS. London: Ian Allan.
- Maynard, John (1996). Bennett and the Pathfinders. London: Arms and Armour.
- Morgan, Eric B.; Shacklady, Edward (1993). Spitfire: The History. London: Key Publishing. ISBN 0-946219-10-9.
- Murray, Williamson (1989) [1983]. Strategy for defeat: the Luftwaffe, 1933-1945. Maxwell Air Force Base, Alabama: Air University Press. ISBN 978-0-933852-45-7.
