= John Dering Nettleton =

RAF officer (1917–1943)

John Dering Nettleton VC
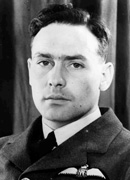
- Born: 28 June 1917; Nongoma, Natal Province, South Africa
- Died: 13 July 1943 (aged 26) near Brest, France
- Military career
- Allegiance: United Kingdom
- Branch: Royal Air Force
- Service years: 1938–1943
- Rank: Squadron leader
- Units: No. 207 Squadron RAF; No. 98 Squadron RAF; No. 185 Squadron RAF; No. 44 (Rhodesia) Squadron
- Conflicts: Second World War: European air campaign †; Augsburg bombing campaign; Augsburg raid
- Awards: Victoria Cross; Mentioned in Despatches (2)

John Dering Nettleton, VC (28 June 1917 – 13 July 1943) was a South African officer in the Royal Air Force (RAF) during the Second World War. He is most famous for leading the Augsburg raid, a daylight attack against the MAN U-boat engine plant in Augsburg on 17 April 1942. For his role in this mission he was awarded the Victoria Cross, the highest award for gallantry in the face of the enemy that can be awarded to British and Commonwealth forces.

== Early life ==
Born on 28 June 1917 in Nongoma, Natal Province, South Africa, Nettleton was the grandson of Admiral A.T.D. Nettleton. He was educated at Western Province Preparatory School in Cape Town from 1928 to 1930. Nettleton served as a naval cadet on the General Botha training ship, and then for 18 months in the South African Merchant Marine. He took up civil engineering, working in various parts of South Africa.

== Second World War ==
Commissioned in the Royal Air Force (RAF) in December 1938, Nettleton then served with Nos. 207, 98 and 185 Squadrons before joining No. 44 Squadron flying the Handley Page Hampden. He took part in a daylight attack on Brest on 24 July 1941 and in a series of other bombing raids and was mentioned in despatches in September 1940. Nettleton was promoted flying officer in July 1940, flight lieutenant in February 1941 and was a squadron leader by July 1941. No. 44 Squadron was based at RAF Waddington, Lincolnshire at this time and had taken delivery of Lancasters in late 1941.

In 1942 a daylight bombing mission was planned by RAF Bomber Command against the MAN U-boat engine plant in Augsburg in Bavaria, responsible for the production of half of Germany's U‑boat engines. It was the first major mission flown using the new Avro Lancaster, a four engine bomber with tremendous lift, great range, and a heavy defensive armament. It would be the longest low‑level penetration raid made during the course of the Second World War. Nettleton was nearing the end of his first tour, and was placed in command of the mission. The operation would require the force to fly at very low level to avoid detection from German radar. To prepare for the raid the two squadrons committed were pulled out of the bombing campaign against Germany to practice low level formation flying.

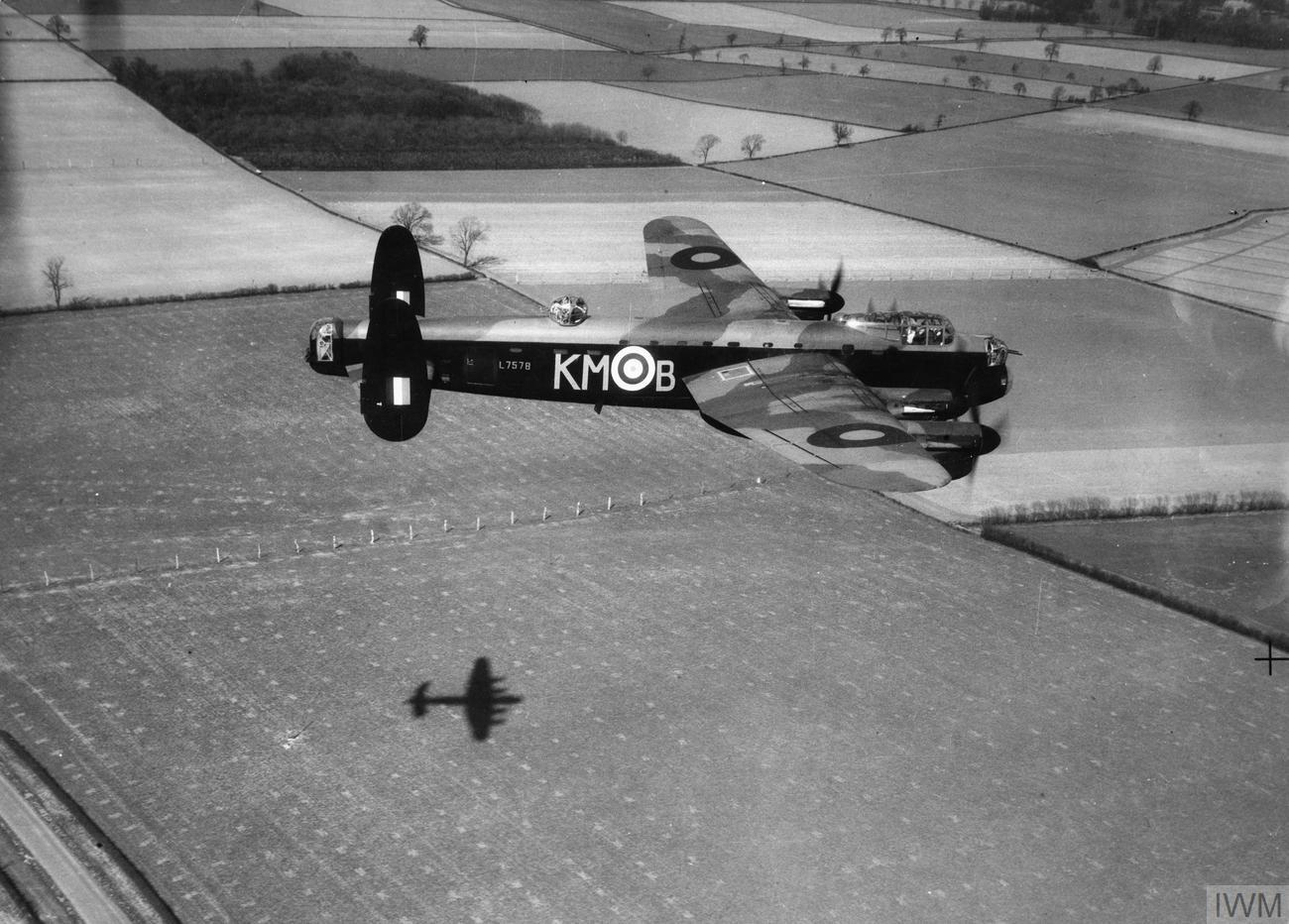
Nettleton on his final low level practice flight over England in preparation for the Augsburg raid

The Augsburg raid commenced on the afternoon of 17 April 1942, when Nettleton led six Lancaster bombers from RAF Waddington south in two flights of three. A few miles away at RAF Woodhall Spa, six more Lancasters from No. 97 Squadron took to the air and headed south as well. The two groups did not link up, which was not required as part of their mission. Both groups reached Selsey Bill independently, flew out over the channel and turned toward the French coast. The No. 97 Squadron group caught sight of the No. 44 Squadron aircraft as they approached the continent, but the No. 44 Squadron aircraft were running a course slightly to the north of what was planned and the No. 97 Squadron commander chose not to close up. Shortly after Nettleton's group crossed the French coast near Dieppe, German fighters of Stab and II./JG 2, returning after intercepting a planned diversionary raid which had been organised to assist the bombers, attacked the No. 44 Squadron aircraft a short way inland. Four of the Lancasters were shot down. Nettleton continued towards the target, and his two remaining aircraft attacked the factory, bombing it amid heavy anti aircraft fire. Both aircraft dropped their bombs but were hit as they flew away from the target. Nettleton's aircraft limped back on three engines. His companion's Lancaster caught on fire and crashed. At the end of his return flight Nettleton's aircraft overflew the United Kingdom and was out over the Irish Sea before turning back and finally landing near Blackpool. He was awarded the Victoria Cross, gazetted on 24 April 1942. His award citation read:

Squadron Leader Nettleton was the leader of one of two formations of six Lancaster heavy bombers detailed to deliver a low-level attack in daylight on the diesel engine factory at Augsburg in Southern Germany on April 17th, 1942. The enterprise was daring, the target of high military importance. To reach it and get back, some 1,000 miles had to be flown over hostile territory. Soon after crossing into enemy territory his formation was engaged by 25 to 30 fighters. A running fight ensued. His rear guns went out of action. One by one the aircraft of his formation were shot down until in the end only his own and one other remained. The fighters were shaken off but the target was still far distant. There was formidable resistance to be faced.

With great spirit and almost defenceless, he held his two remaining aircraft on their perilous course and after a long and arduous flight, mostly at only 50 feet above the ground, he brought them to Augsburg. Here anti-aircraft fire of great intensity and accuracy was encountered. The two aircraft came low over the roof-tops. Though fired at from point blank range, they stayed the course to drop their bombs true on the target. The second aircraft, hit by flak, burst into flames and crash-landed. The leading aircraft, though riddled with holes, flew safely back to base, the only one of the six to return.

Squadron Leader Nettleton, who has successfully undertaken many other hazardous operations, displayed unflinching determination as well as leadership and valour of the highest order."

On the night of 12/13 July 1943, Bomber Command put in a raid of 295 Lancasters against Turin in northern Italy. The object of the raid was to encourage the fascist government of Italy to withdraw from the war. Turin was a distant target, and being summer the nights were relatively short. With limited darkness, the return to England could not be flown direct, and had to be routed over the Bay of Biscay to avoid German day fighters. Flying Lancaster KM-Z (ED331), Nettleton took off from RAF Dunholme Lodge in Lincolnshire at 10:23 pm. Another Lancaster on the mission was that of Leonard Bradfield. As dawn rose a number of Lancasters caught sight of each other and grouped together for protection. Also returning from the mission, Bradfield and his crew spotted a group of Lancasters off their starboard side, on a track some 30 degrees to their west. Bradfield was confident he was on the correct course. He had a good visual, and his position had been confirmed with a strong signal from Gee. The Lancasters to their west were too near the coast. Bradfield's aircraft signalled, but they received no response.

At about 6:30 am the group of Lancasters with Nettleton were intercepted by German day fighters that had been scrambled from their base south of Brest. Among the Lancaster losses from the mission, three aircraft were known to have been shot down over the Bay of Biscay, while six more were lost without a trace. Nettleton and his crew were among the losses. Their bodies were never recovered. All are commemorated on the Runnymede Memorial.

== Legacy ==
Following the war the government of Southern Rhodesia named a new school after Squadron Leader Nettleton: Nettleton Junior School, Braeside, Salisbury, Southern Rhodesia (present-day Harare, Zimbabwe).

On 2 March 1994, a Junior Rank accommodation block was formally opened at RAF Shawbury under the name of Nettleton. A commemorative plaque is located inside detailing Nettleton's life and service.
