= No. 44 Squadron RAF =

Defunct flying squadron of the Royal Air Force

No. 44 (Rhodesia) Squadron RAF
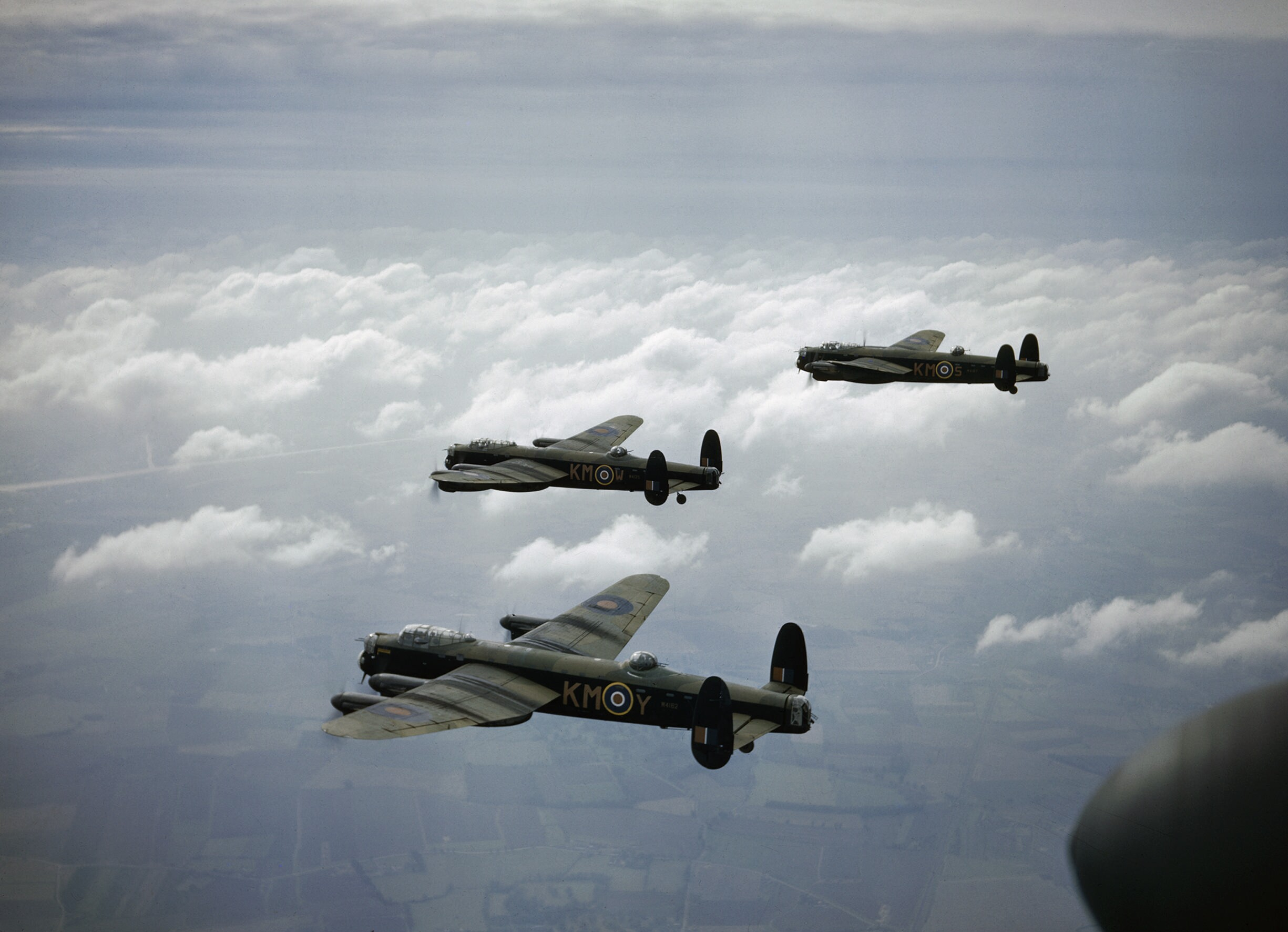
- No. 44 Sqn Avro Lancaster B.I in flight, 29 September 1942
- Active: 24 July 1917 – 1 April 1918 (RFC); 1 April 1918 – 31 Dec 1919 (RAF); 8 March 1937 – 16 July 1957; 10 August 1960 – 21 Dec 1982
- Branch: Royal Air Force
- Mottos: Latin: Fulmina regis iusta ("The King's thunderbolts are righteous")
- Battle honours: Home Defence, 1917–18*; Channel & North Sea, 1939–45*; Invasion Ports, 1940*; German Ports, Baltic, 1940–45; France & Low Countries, 1940; Biscay Ports, 1940–44; Ruhr, 1940–43 & 1945*; Berlin 1940–44*; Atlantic, 1942; Normandy, 1944*; Rhine, 1940–44*; Fortress Europe, 1940–44*; France & Germany, 1944–45; Walcheren. Honours marked with an asterisk* are those emblazoned on the Squadron Standard

Commanders
- Notable commanders: Arthur "Bomber" Harris

Insignia
- Badge: On a mount, an Elephant
- Squadron Codes: JW (Oct 1938 – Sep 1939); KM (Sep 1939 – Jan 1951)

Number 44 (Rhodesia) Squadron was an aviation unit of the Royal Air Force. It was active between 1917 and 1982. For most of its history it served as a heavy bomber squadron.

== History ==
=== The World Wars (1917–1945) ===
No. 44 Squadron was formed on 24 July 1917 as a Home Defence unit forming part of the London Air Defence Area. The squadron, based at Hainault Farm, Essex, pioneered the use of the Sopwith Camel in night fighter operations. By the end of the First World War it was commanded by Arthur Harris, later known as Bomber Harris.

Disbanding on 31 December 1919, the squadron was reformed as a bomber squadron in March 1937 and equipped with Hawker Hinds. Moving to RAF Waddington later that year, it was equipped with Bristol Blenheims before changing to Handley Page Hampdens. During the war the squadron was subsequently based at RAF Dunholme Lodge, near Dunholme, then RAF Spilsby at Great Steeping in Lincolnshire.

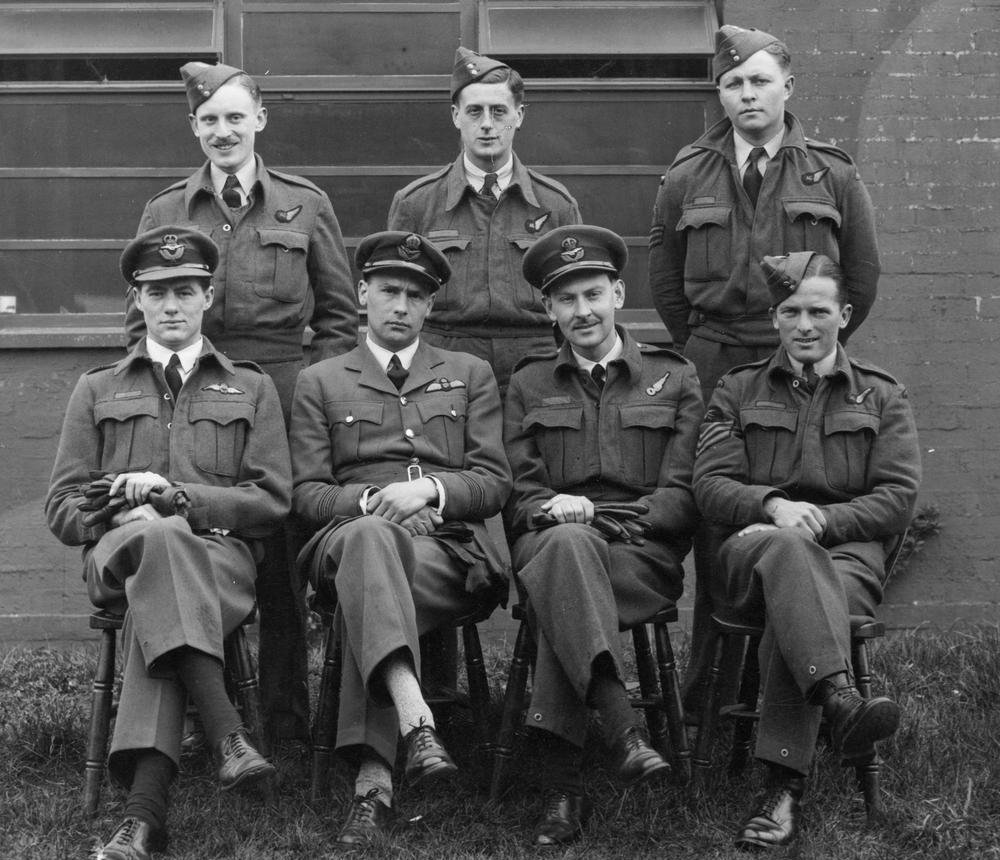
Sole surviving crew of 44 Squadron following the Augsburg raid. John Nettleton is sitting second from the left.

At the outbreak of the Second World War, as part of Bomber Harris' No. 5 Group, the squadron was commanded by John Boothman, winner of the Schneider Trophy in September 1931. It was one of only two squadrons to operate continuously throughout the war. There were two squadron commanders who held the Victoria Cross – Wing Commanders Roderick Learoyd and John Nettleton.

In 1941, the squadron was renamed No. 44 (Rhodesia) Squadron in honour of that colony's contribution to Britain's war effort, and also to recognise that up to 25% of the ground and air crew were from South Africa, including John Nettleton who was born and raised there, and Southern Rhodesia. The badge is based upon the seal of Lo Bengula, the chief of the Matabele on conquest. The seal shows an elephant which, in the case of this unit, is intended to indicate heavy attacks.

No. 44 Squadron received its first Avro Lancaster, in late 1941 and became the first squadron to convert completely to Lancasters, flying their first operational missions in the aircraft on 3 March 1942. Total sorties and losses for the war were:

- Handley Page Hampden – 2,043 sorties (43 lost)
- Avro Lancaster – 4,362 sorties (149 lost, plus 22 destroyed in crashes)

The squadron suffered the third highest overall casualties of RAF Bomber Command. In July 1945, the squadron exchanged places with No. 75 Squadron in RAF Mepal in Cambridgeshire to prepare for transfer to Tiger Force in the Far East for the war on Japan.

=== Cold War (1946–1982) ===
After the war (from 1946–1947) the squadron was re-equipped with Avro Lincolns, converting to the Boeing Washington B.1 in 1951 and then the English Electric Canberra during the Suez Crisis before disbanding on 16 July 1957.

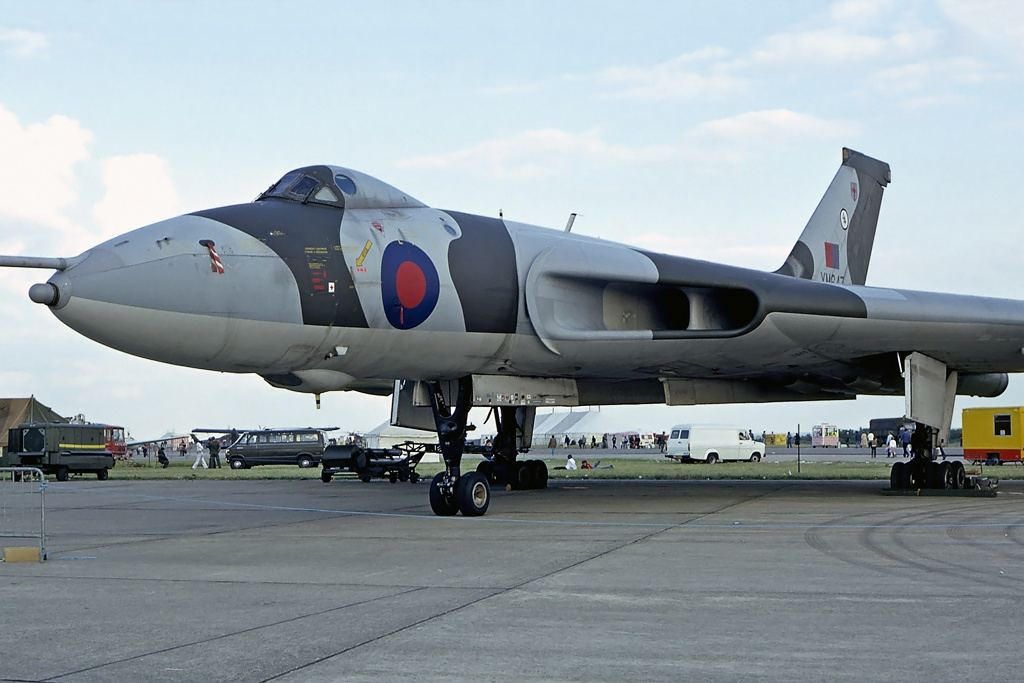
Avro Vulcan B.2 XM647 of No. 44 Squadron at RAF Greenham Common, 1980.

Reforming yet again at RAF Waddington on 10 August 1960, as part of RAF Bomber Command's V bomber force maintaining the UK's strategic nuclear deterrent, the squadron was equipped with the Avro Vulcan B.1 before upgrading to the Vulcan B.1A in January 1961. Both types were equipped with various free-fall nuclear weapons. These may have included Blue Danube, the U.S. Mark 5 nuclear bomb supplied under Project E, Red Beard, Yellow Sun Mk.1, and certainly Yellow Sun Mk.2.

After the advent of effective Soviet surface-to-air missiles forced Bomber Command to reassign V bombers from high-altitude operations to low-level penetration operations, the squadron's Vulcans adopted a mission profile that included a 'pop-up' manoeuvre to 11,000 ft for safe release of Yellow Sun Mk. 2. The aircraft was then leveled off at about 10 miles or less from the target. In training this distance tended to creep until the aircraft would have been vulnerable to SAM. A new manoeuvre was developed by the research branch and the Bomber Command Development Unit. This required aircraft to home to a specific point at a distance from the target based on the mark of aircraft and its engines. In the case of No. 44 Squadron with the Vulcan B.1A, this point was some 21,000 yards from the target. The aircraft would then be set in a climb at a specified angle of about 12 degrees for the Mk1a. As the aircraft passed 10,500 feet the bomb would be released. This was crude dead reckoning, and the Mk 1 crews realized that the ballistic computer in the NBC could calculate a much more accurate release point. The crews determined to use the automatic computing. Occasionally in training the pull up was late and the release would occur at a much lower altitude. This risked either a weapon failure or suicide from an early burst. In January 1968 the squadron was re-equipped with eight Vulcan B2 aircraft and eight WE.177B laydown bombs which improved aircraft survivability by enabling aircraft to remain at low-level during weapon release.

Following the transfer of responsibility for the nuclear deterrent to Royal Navy submarines the squadron was reassigned to NATO's Supreme Allied Commander Europe (SACEUR) for tactical strike missions. In a high-intensity European war the squadron's role was to support land forces resisting a Soviet attack into Western Europe by striking deep into enemy-held areas beyond the forward edge of the battlefield, striking at enemy concentrations and infrastructure, first with conventional weapons and secondly with tactical nuclear weapons as required, should a conflict escalate to that stage.

The squadron's Vulcan B2.s served mainly in that low-level penetration role until 1982 when they saw action during the Falklands War. No. 44 Squadron was then disbanded on 21 December 1982.

== Honours ==
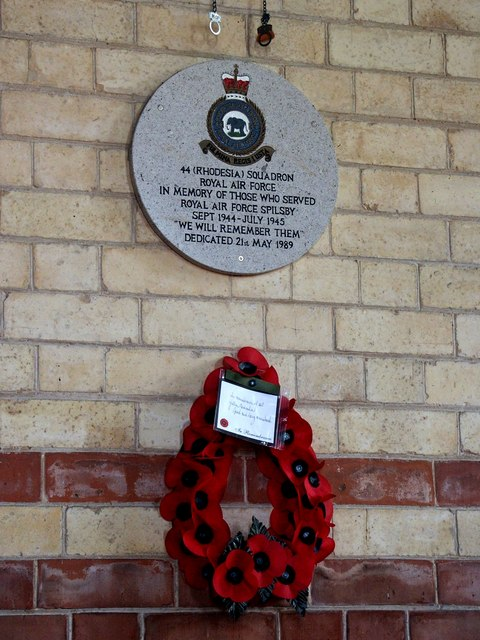
A memorial plaque in All Saints Church, Great Steeping, to the members of 44 Squadron who flew from RAF Spilsby

During World War II, a number of decorations were awarded to members of 44 Squadron. These included one Victoria Cross awarded to Wing Commander J.D. Nettleton, six Distinguished Service Orders, one Conspicuous Gallantry Medal, one Air Force Medal, one British Empire Medal, 151 Distinguished Flying Crosses, one bar to a DFC and 97 Distinguished Flying Medals.

== Aircraft operated ==
Aircraft operated include:

- Sopwith 1½ Strutter (July 1917–Sep 1917)
- Sopwith Camel (Aug 1917–June 1919)
- Hawker Hind (Mar 1937–Dec 1937)
- Bristol Blenheim Mk.I (Dec 1937–Feb 1939)
- Avro Anson Mk.I (Feb 1939–June 1939)
- Handley Page Hampden Mk.I (Feb 1939–Dec 1941)
- Avro Lancaster Mk.I (Dec 1941–Sep 1947)
- Avro Lancaster Mk.III (Dec 1941–Sep 1947)
- Avro Lincoln B.2 (Oct 1945–May 1946; Dec 1946–Mar 1947; May 1947–Jan 1951)
- Boeing Washington B.1 (Feb 1951–Jan 1953)
- English Electric Canberra B.2 (Apr 1953–July 1957)
- Avro Vulcan B.1 (Aug 1960–Sep 1962)
- Avro Vulcan B.1A (Jan 1961–Sep 1967)
- Avro Vulcan B.2 (Sep 1966–Dec 1982)

== See also ==
- List of Royal Air Force aircraft squadrons
- Royal Rhodesian Air Force
