= No. 97 Squadron RAF =

Defunct flying squadron of the Royal Air Force

No. 97 (Straits Settlements) Squadron RAF
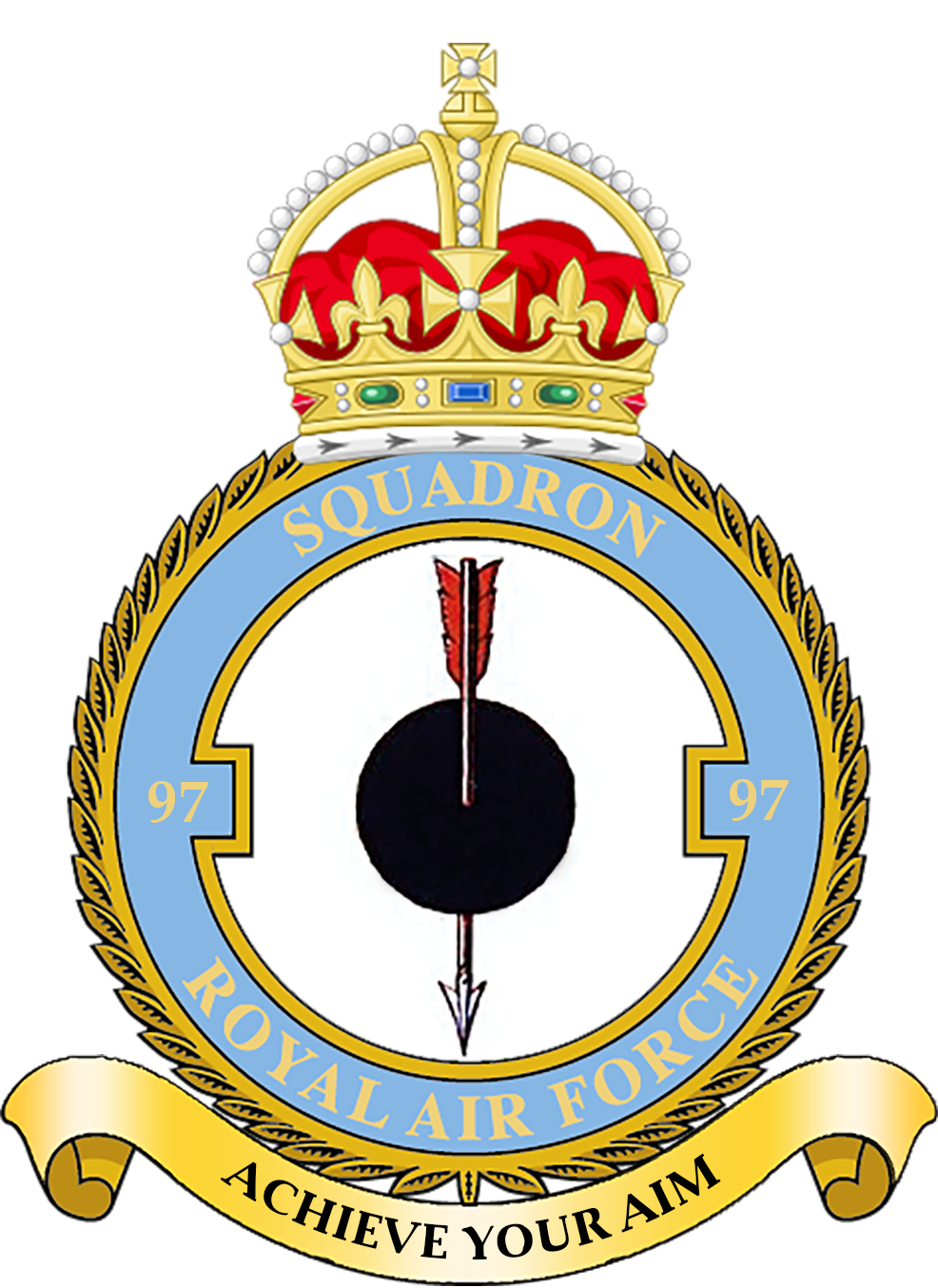
- Squadron badge
- Active: 1 December 1917 to 1 April 1920; September 1935 to 20 May 1940; 25 February 1941 1 January 1956; 1 Dec 1959 to 2 January 1967
- Country: United Kingdom
- Branch: Royal Air Force
- Nickname: Straits Settlements
- Motto: "Achieve your aim"

Insignia
- Squadron Badge heraldry: An ogress pierced by an arrow, point downwards. The badge is indicative of accurate aim.

No. 97 (Straits Settlements) Squadron, was a Royal Air Force squadron formed on 1 December 1917 at Waddington, Lincolnshire, serving in France as a heavy bomber unit until the end of the First World War.

The squadron reformed and served again flying heavy bombers during the Second World War, becoming a Pathfinder Force unit in 1943. In peacetime, the squadron continued in a variety of roles until final disbandment in 1967.

== World War I ==
The squadron formed on 1 December 1917 at RAF Waddington, and was initially a training unit. The squadron re-equipped with the Handley Page O/400 heavy bomber before moving to France in August 1917. In total, it flew 91 bombing sorties and dropped 64 tons of bombs before the end of the First World War.

== Between the Wars ==
From 17 November 1918, 97 Squadron was based at RAF Saint Inglevert, departing on 4 March 1919, and re-equipping with the Airco DH.10 Amiens. The squadron was later posted to India, where it remained until disbanding on 1 April 1920, after being re-numbered No. 60 squadron.

The squadron reformed on 16 September 1935 at RAF Catfoss, and was equipped with the Handley Page Heyford.

== World War II ==
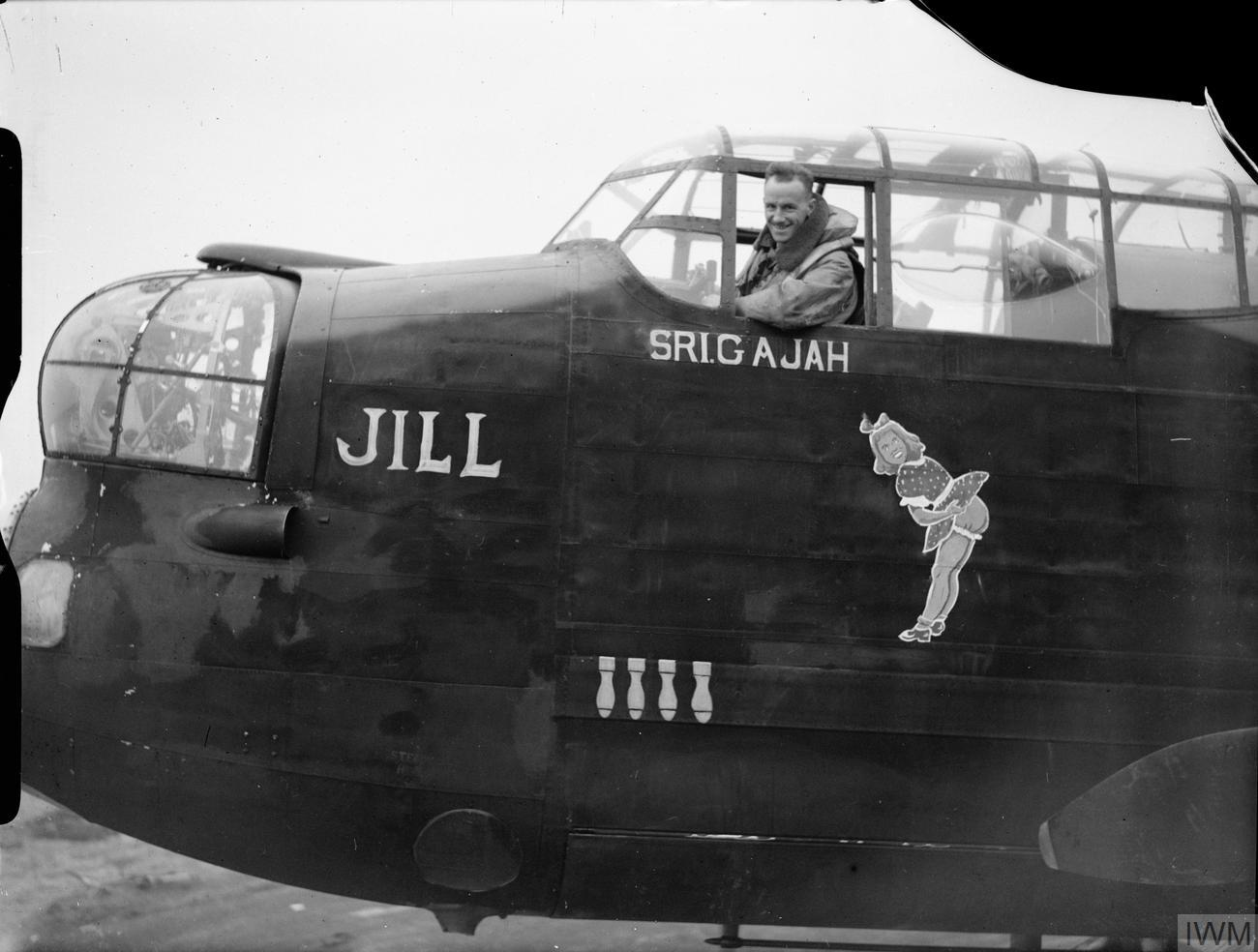
97 Squadron Avro Manchester at RAF Coningsby

The squadron was disbanded again in April 1940.

The squadron reformed again on 25 February 1941 at Waddington, and was equipped with the Avro Manchester bomber. Later the squadron was re-equipped with the Avro Lancaster, and in April 1943 became a Pathfinder Force squadron.

The squadron also trained several pilots who were later transferred to 617 Squadron to participate in Operation Chastise.

== Postwar ==
In July 1946, the squadron re-equipped with the Avro Lincoln, and remained operational until disbanding at Hemswell on 1 January 1956.

The squadron was reformed – as 97(SM) Sqn. – on 1 December 1959 as one of 20 Strategic Missile (SM) squadrons associated with Project Emily. The squadron was equipped with three Thor Intermediate range ballistic missiles. and based at RAF Hemswell.

In October 1962, during the Cuban Missile Crisis, the squadron was kept at full readiness, with the missiles aimed at strategic targets in the USSR. The squadron was disbanded on 24 May 1963 when the Thor Program in Britain was terminated.

The squadron was then reformed again, via the re-numbering of No. 151 Squadron. The reformation took place at RAF Watton on 25 May 1963, the squadron flying the Vickers Varsity T.1, Canberra Mk B.2 and the Hastings C.2. On 2 January 1967 the squadron was disbanded for the final time, still at Watton.

== See also ==
- List of UK Thor missile bases
