= Bombardment of Mailly-le-Camp =

- Part of Second World War
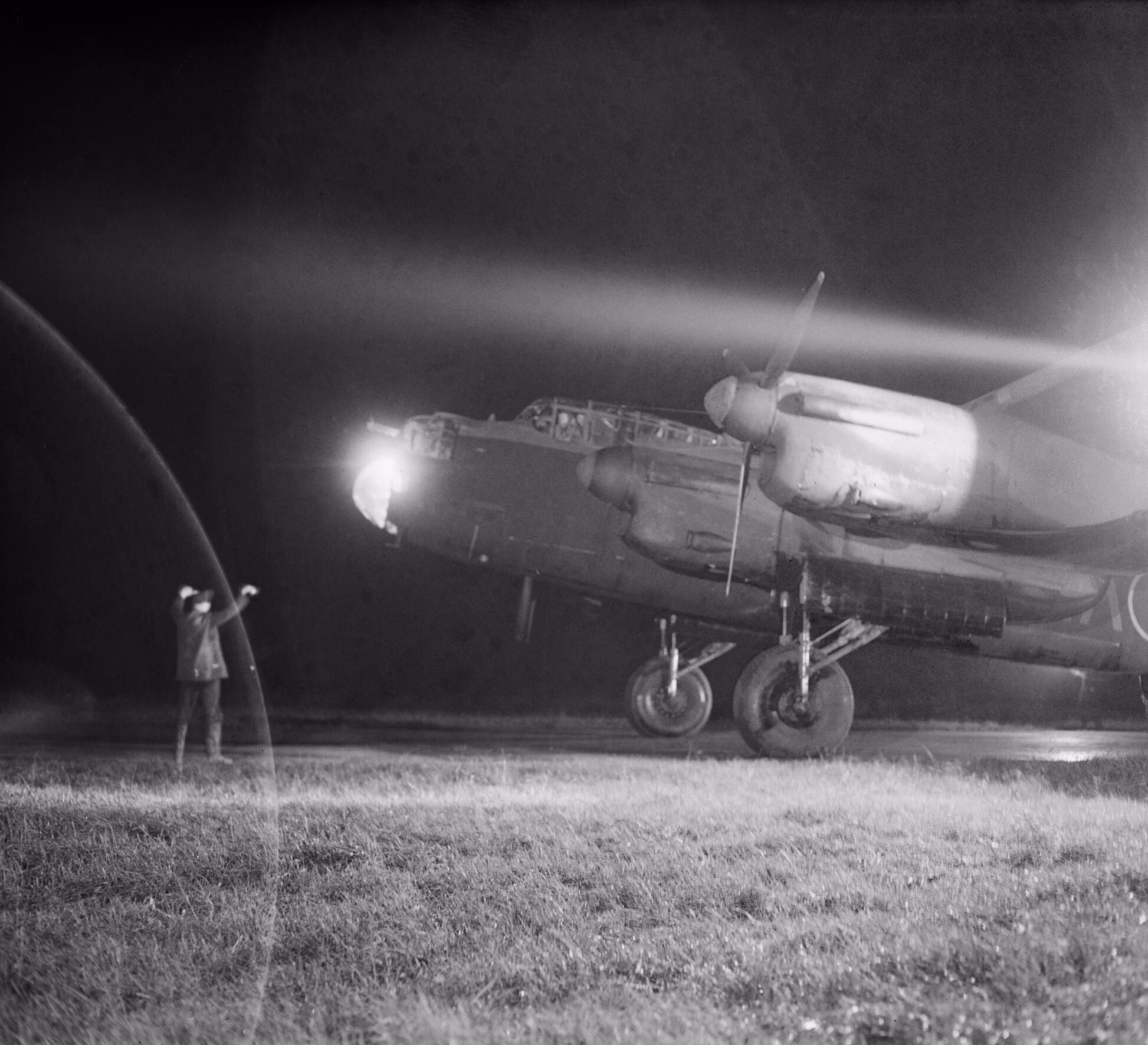
- The Avro Lancaster at the completion of a mission
Date	3/4 May 1944
Location	Mailly-le-Camp, France 48.6686°N 4.2078°E
Result	Training base destroyed

Belligerents
United Kingdom	(Nazi Germany) Germany

Commanders and leaders
Leonard Cheshire; Laurence Deane	unknown

Strength
346 Lancaster heavy bombers 14 Mosquito marker aircraft	Approximately 60 nightfighters

Casualties and losses
Air: 42 aircraft shot down, 1 written off after returning	Air: 3 Bf 110 night-fighters shot down; Ground: 61 buildings, 65 vehicles & 37 tanks destroyed, 218 killed & 156 wounded.

The Bombardment of Mailly-le-Camp was an RAF raid against a German panzer training center located in northern France undertaken during the night of 3/4 May 1944. The mission was a part of the "softening up" campaign Bomber Command conducted prior to the D-Day invasion. The operation was assigned to No. 5 Group, which was joined by No. 1 Group. Estimated a lightly defended target, confusion in the mission plan and communication problems led to the force being held up at the assembly point, where German night fighters slipped in among the bombers. Though the bombers succeeded in destroying the training camp, the victory was achieved at a heavy price.

== Planning ==
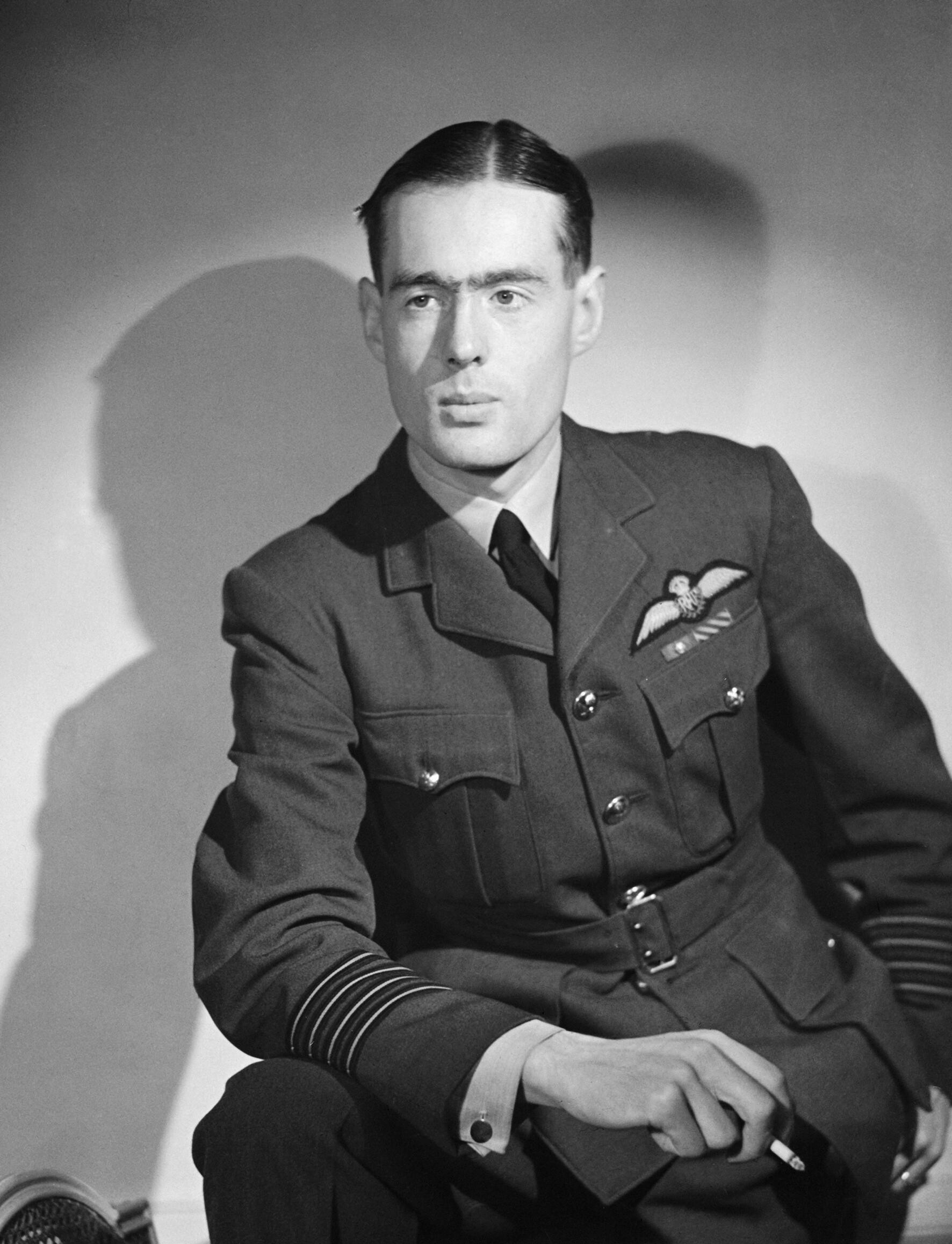
A portrait of Cheshire in 1945

=== Mailly chosen as target ===
The military base at Mailly was just north of the community of Mailly-le-Camp, 80 miles east of Paris along the national road linking Châlons-sur-Marne to Troyes. It was built in 1902 as a barracks and training ground for the French army. In the 1930s it was used for their armoured formations, but since the fall of France it had been taken over by the Germans and used to train replacement crews for panzer units refitting from losses suffered in the east. In the autumn of 1943 requests to monitor the installation were sent to l'Armée Secrète. The organization's Brutus-Nord network was given the assignment of producing detailed plans of the panzer training grounds, and for providing a regularly updated inventory of the German units present.`In the spring of 1944 the group reported the arrival of elements of the 21st Panzer Division.

In April 1944 Bomber Command shifted its bombing campaign from German industrial centers to the destruction of the Wehrmacht's infrastructure in occupied Europe. The new directive was known as the Transport Plan, and was in preparation and support for the D-Day landings. On 2 May Intelligence sent the Mailly target to the Chiefs of Staff Committee, which in turn issued the request to destroy the camp at Mailly to Bomber Command. Bomber Command chief Arthur Harris assigned the mission to Ralph Cochrane and 5 Group.

=== 5 Group Op ===
5 Group had developed a low level marking technique that was very accurate. Since proving it to Harris a week earlier in a raid against the railyards at Munich, 5 Group had been given a measure of autonomy from the rest of Bomber Command. Harris had provided four Mosquitos to 617 Squadron to effect their low level marking. In addition, he transferred 627 Squadron (Mosquitos) from the Pathfinder Force, along with the Lancaster formations 83 Squadron and 97 Squadron. With the transfers, 5 Group had its own small marking force.

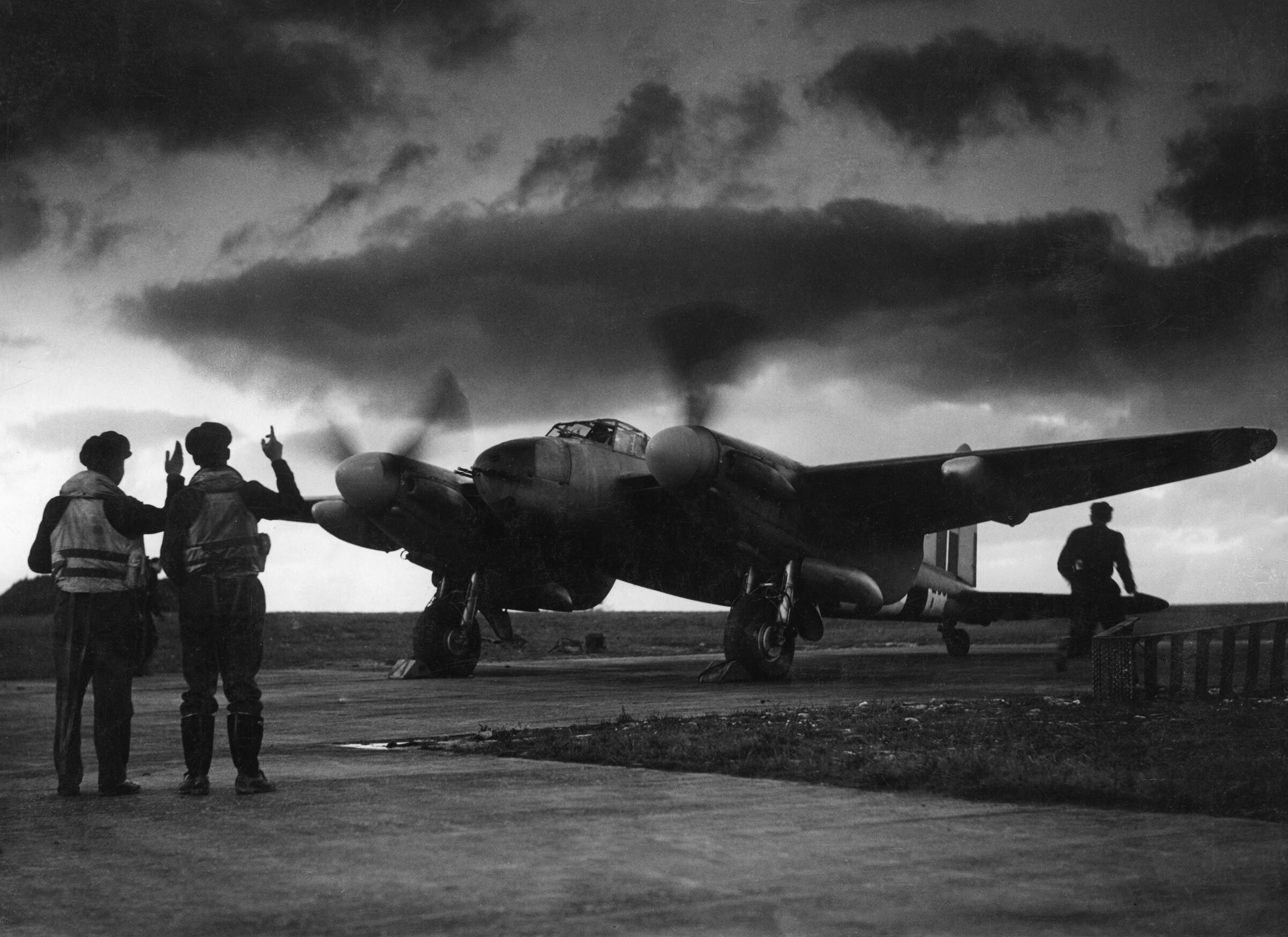
A Mosquito prepares to launch into the night

The mission was run the 5 Group way. Unlike a mission guided by the Pathfinder Force, there would be no Master Bomber. The 5 Group method used a Marker Leader who was in charge of marking the target, and a Main Force Controller in charge of the bombing force. In this case, Leonard Cheshire was the Marker Leader, who would make a low level marking of the target from his Mosquito. To support him were the three other Mosquitos of 617 Squadron, but the Lancasters of 617 Squadron were assigned a practice flight for a deception mission involving the delivery of Window at low level. In their place the aircraft backing up Cheshire's target markers were Lancasters from 83 and 97 squadrons, the PFF squadrons newly arrived to 5 Group. In addition, a number of Oboe equipped Mosquitos were assigned to the mission from the Pathfinder Force to drop shielded illumination flares over Mailly, and the yellow marker flares over the assembly point. The Main Force Controller was wing commander Laurence Deane, the CO of 83 Squadron. He was backed up by his Deputy Controller, squadron leader Neville "Ned" Sparks.

The planners hoped to catch the 21st Panzer Division in their barracks. As curfew for troops on the continent was midnight, Cheshire was to drop his target marking flares at 12:01, one minute after soldiers were required to return to barracks. Seeking to gain greater punch, Cochrane called upon Air Vice-Marshal Edward Rice, the CO of 1 Group, and asked him to join his force with Cochrane's for the mission. Like Cochrane, Rice wanted his group to operate independent of the Pathfinder Force, and was developing his own marker force. The unit of 6 Lancasters was called the Special Duty Flight. Cochrane stated that both groups would hit the depot buildings, but enticed Rice by noting the base had a tank repair facility that was a special target. The target could be destroyed by the aircraft of a couple squadrons, and could be marked by Rice's Special Duty Flight.

Cheshire had worked out his marking technique with 617 Squadron, with Cheshire or Martin marking, while the rest of the squadron waited to hear from him before coming over the target one at a time at altitude.

The seeds for disaster were sown with 5 Group's hasty preparation, the lack of a clear understanding of the mission in the minds of the various flight leaders, a lack of familiarity with Cheshire's method, and problems that developed in radio communication that were not apparent until the Main Force Controller was over the target.

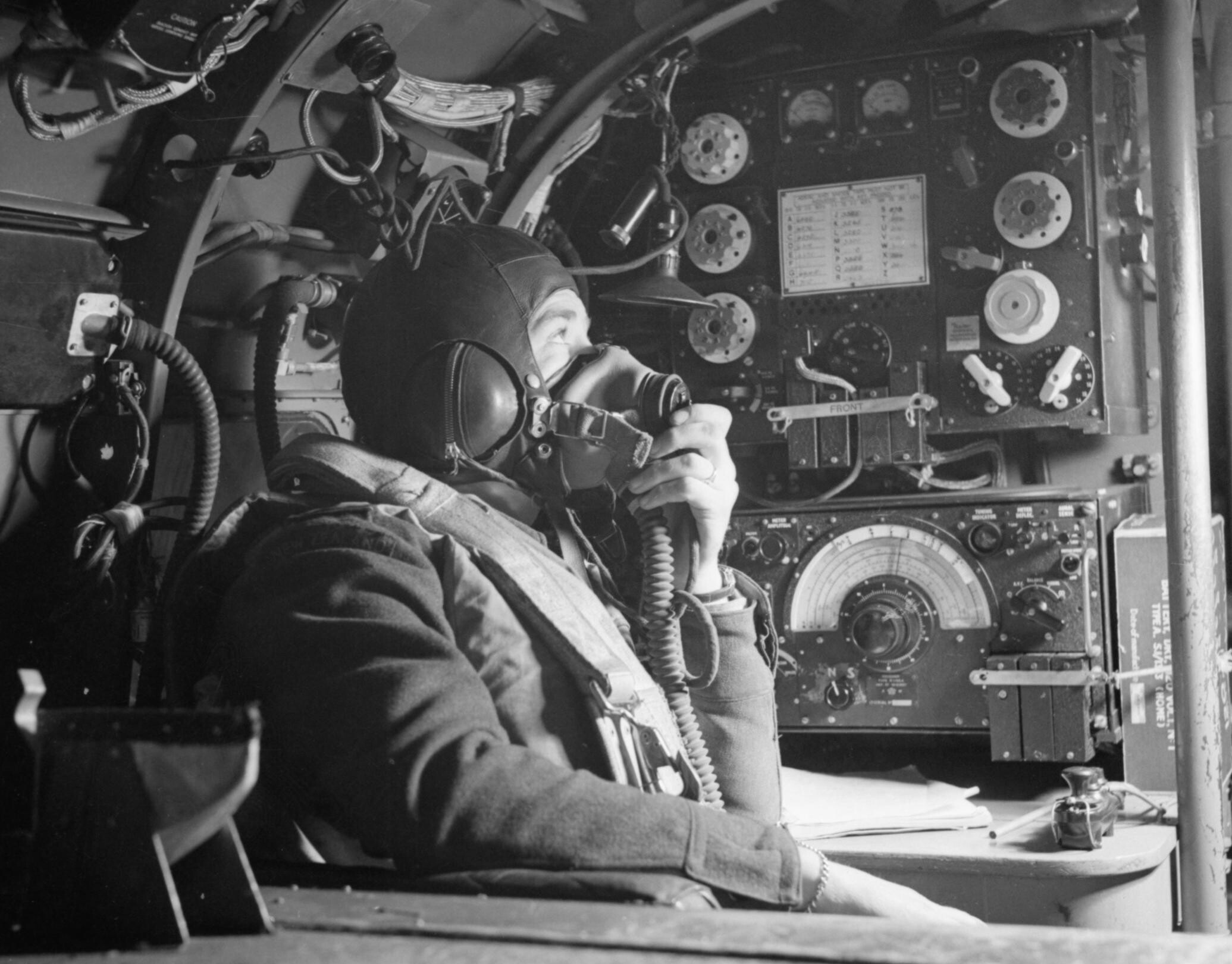
The wireless operator at his post aboard a Lancaster

Throughout the bombing campaign against Germany, Bomber Command aircraft had used HF for Radio Transmission on those occasions when radio silence was broken. The primary use was for the PFF Master Bomber to guide in the Main Force bombers during an attack. These were one-way conversations, and radio discipline was maintained. Cochrane had learned that Fighter Command had switched to VHF as it gave a clearer transmission of voice between aircraft. Never one to allow a technical advance to pass by him, Cochrane converted 5 Group to VHF as well. It was the belief of 5 Group planners that 1 Group was still using HF, so it was decided that Deane would transmit his orders to the bombing force by Wireless Transmission in Morse. Ironically, unbeknownst to Cochrane, Rice had followed his lead and converted 1 Group to VHF. Worse, a Wireless Operator was not a part of the crew in the Mosquito. Cheshire would not be able to communicate to the Main Force by wireless.

=== Mission plan ===
With only a day to prepare, 5 Group planners were very busy setting out all that needed to be accomplished before the aircraft took off for their targets. The plans for the mission were hurriedly put together. A route to target was picked, fuel requirements calculated, bombing heights set and bomb loads worked out.

The route took the bombers south from Lincolnshire, climbing as they crossed over England and turning southwest over Reading. Continuing on they would reach Beachy Head, where they would head out over the Channel. Continuing to climb, they would reach 12,000 feet before arriving over the French coast, crossing it north of Dieppe. Here they would turn slightly to the north, and make their 156-mile trek across northern France, losing altitude along the way, to reach the assembly point 15 miles north of Mailly-le-Camp. The location would be marked with yellow flares by Oboe equipped Mosquitos from the Pathfinder Force. From the assembly point the bombers would fly due south to the target, drop their bombs on the markers present and exit to the south. Continuing on for ten miles, they would reach Troyes. Here they would make a 90 degree turn to the west and head toward Fontainebleau. At Fontainebleau their course would bend slightly to the north, passing by Chartres on the way to a pinpoint near Flers. There they would make a second 90 degree turn, coming north to Bayeux 20 miles northwest of Caen, heading back across the Channel for Selsey Bill and England.

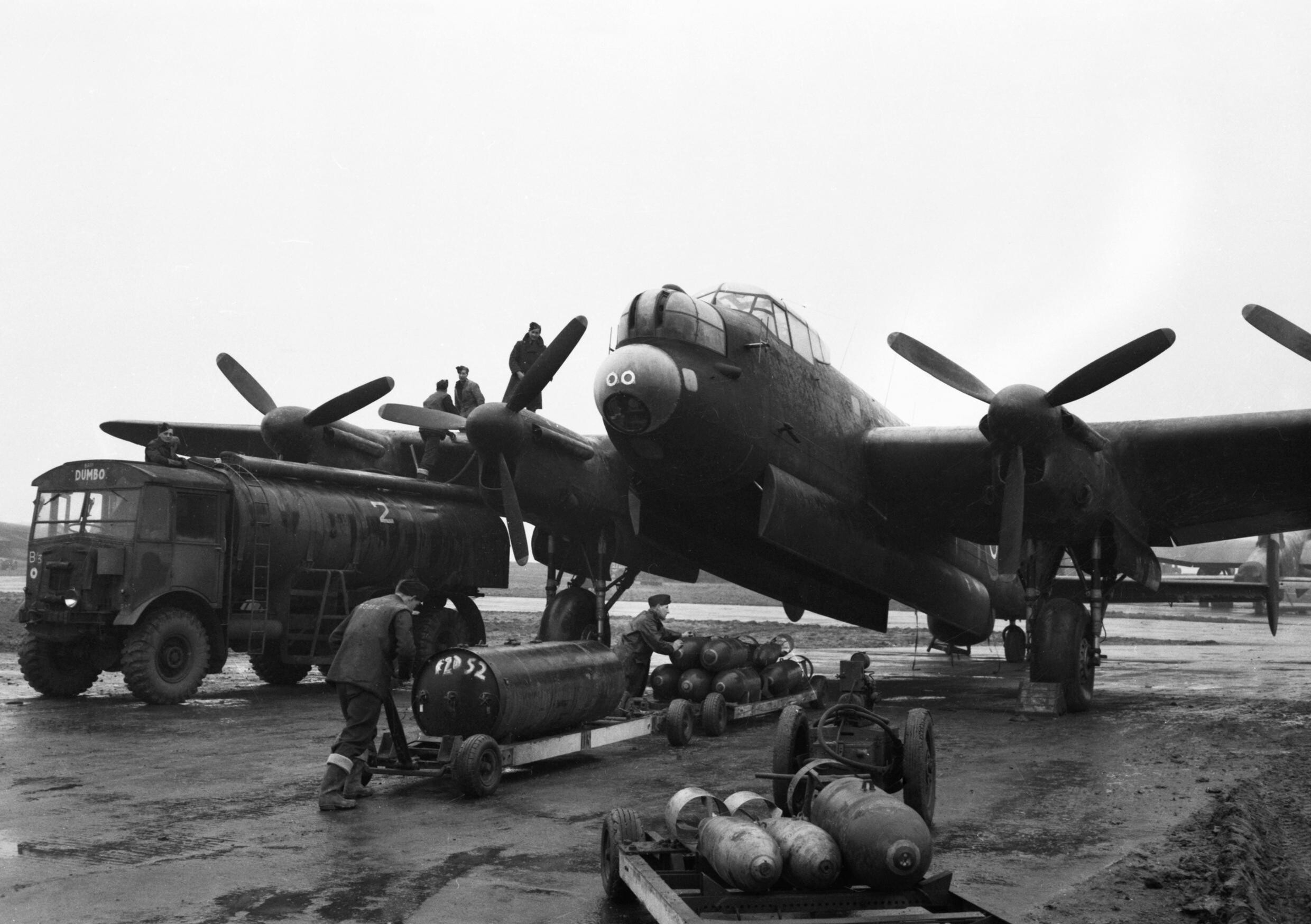
Ground crews refuelling and bombing up an Avro Lancaster. The bomb load includes a 4,000-lb HC 'cookie'

The bombing of the target could not be completed in the normal fashion for two main reasons. First, there was a French village nearby. Casualties among French civilians were to be kept to a minimum. It was decided to use a low bombing altitude to improve accuracy and avoid casualties among the French. Secondly, the marker aircraft would be using Cheshire's low level marking technique. For every thousand pounds of HE in a bomb, a heavy bomber had to have a thousand feet of clearance above the blast to avoid being knocked down by it. It was worse for a Mosquito. A Mosquito at 5,000 feet or less was unlikely to survive the bomb blast of a 4,000 pound "cookie" going off below it. The initial laying down of markers was not a problem, but if a second aiming point was needed mid-mission, the bombing would have to be halted while the new markers were being laid on if the marker crews were to survive their mission.

Bomb loads were set at one 4,000-pound "cookie", with 15 or 16 500 pound HE bombs, depending on the distance of the plane's field to the target. Though incendiaries usually made up 50% of the bomb load against a German city, no incendiaries were used on this raid. In addition, though a normal bombing mission over Germany would be flown at 18,000 to 21,000 feet, the raid to Mailly would be flown much lower. Bombing height would be from 6,000 to 8,000 feet to minimize scatter and improve accuracy. The low altitude of the bombers would place them in range of light flak, but the lowest aircraft would still be 2,000 feet above the height of the bomb blast shock delivered by the "cookies".

The mission was to unfold as follows: just before midnight Mosquitos from PFF were to drop shielded illumination flares over Mailly-le-Camp, using Oboe to confirm their location. Time on target was 12:01, when Cheshire would mark the east end of the camp. He had 6 minutes to check and reset these markers. If satisfied he would signal the Main Force Controller, Laurence Deane. Deane would call in the 173 Lancasters of 5 Group to bomb with the signal "Rat One, bomb". Over the next 6 minutes they would drop their loads upon the east end markers. After the first wave of bombers had passed over the target the bombing would be halted, while Cheshire used the next 9 minutes to return over Mailly and mark the west end of the camp. Now at 12:20, the marker aircraft would get out of the way and the second wave of 140 Lancasters from 1 Group would be called in with the signal "Rat Two, bomb". Over the next 6 minutes they would drop their bomb loads over the target. By 12:26 all aircraft would be out of the target area.

An assembly point was set up 15 miles north of Mailly near Germinon. Three 627 Squadron Mosquitos were assigned to keep the assembly point marked by yellow target indicator flares. As aircraft arrived they would make large left hand circles there until they received word that the target was accurately marked, so they could begin their bomb runs.

Being a target in France, little resistance was expected. The Met prediction was for clear skies and a 3/4 moon. One Commanding Officer said it would be like falling off a log. "Just go in, wipe it off the map and come home." The mission was expected to be the proverbial "piece of cake." Said wireless operator Ron Story of 166 Squadron "We were to bomb from 8,000 feet. On reaching the assembly point, we were to circle the avenue of flames, and await the instructions from the Master Bomber who would give the go ahead to head for the target and bomb precisely on the markers. It all sounded so simple, and we were in such good spirits."

Though the target itself would not be heavily defended by Flak placements, a problem lay in the fact that four German night fighter airbases were within easy reach of the assembly point: III/NJG-1 at Athies-sous-Laon, I/NJG-4 at Florennes, II/NJG-4 at Coulommiers, III/NJG-4 at Athies, plus III/NJG-5 and I/NJG-5 at St. Dizier. Of the 92 aircraft on inventory for these units, approximately 60 could be expected to be serviceable at any one time. In reviewing the mission, author and former RAF bomber pilot Jack Currie noted "That a planning staff could contemplate, or a commander countenance, any plan of action in which a possibility existed - even a remote one - of several hundred fully-laden Lancasters orbiting a marker, in bright moonlight, within striking range of at least four night-fighter bases, staggers the imagination. That criticism, however, is formed with the advantage of hindsight. It is clear that, at the time, no one saw reason to expect a disaster." As in any mission, delays near the target area could prove costly.

== The raid ==
=== Flight out ===
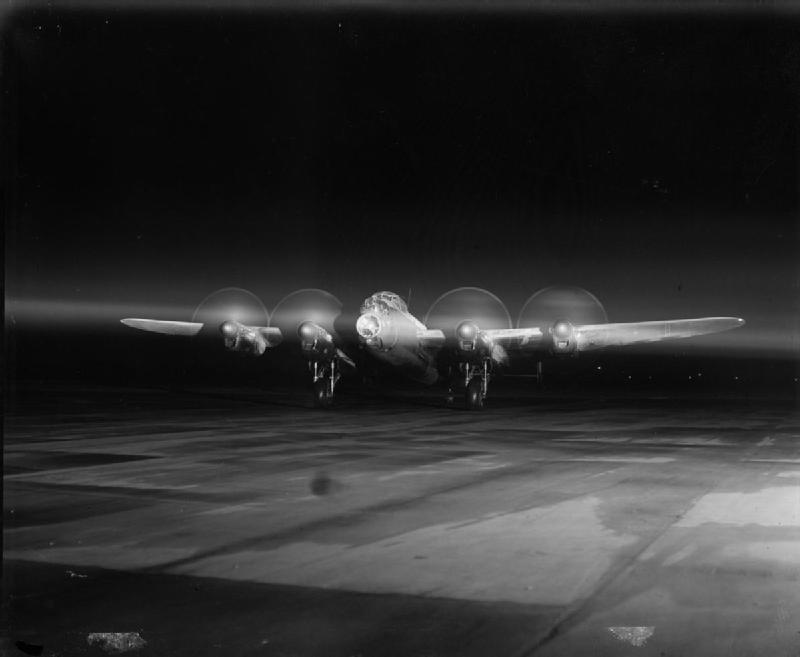
A Lancaster stands ready to launch into the night

At 21:45 ten squadrons from 5 Group began to take to the air, followed shortly by seven more from 1 Group. They headed south, gaining altitude while leaving behind the farmlands of Lincolnshire. They passed above Beachy Head and continued to climb as they crossed the Channel. To minimize exposure to German Flak batteries along the coast, they crossed into France at 12,000 feet just north of Dieppe. They then began a slow descent to 7,000 feet, reaching the assembly point beacon 15 miles north of the target.

Some 20 minutes after the bombers left their bases Cheshire and his four marker Mosquitos of 617 Squadron took off in pursuit. Piloting the Mosquitos along with Cheshire were Dave Shannon, David Kearns and Gerry Fawke. In the dark of night they did not fly together, but each aircraft navigated to the target on its own. Each would catch up with the main force and pass them, arriving over the training camp solo and early. Backing them were the two former PFF squadrons, 83 and 97, which would act as back up marker units. Cheshire was over the target 8 minutes before he was to mark the target. To avoid alerting the training camp, he flew on to St. Dizier and made a few passes over the night fighter base there to give the appearance of an intruder flight. Shannon had to put a few dog legs in his approach to burn off time.

At the assembly point Mosquitos of 627 Squadron dropped yellow Target Indicator flares. The aircraft of the two groups of heavy bombers were to orbit the assembly marker as they arrived until the target was correctly marked. First to arrive were the aircraft of 5 Group, which made up the first wave. The aircraft were stacked at altitudes of 100 feet separation. The arriving bombers began to make their large left hand circles about the marker while they awaited the signal to commence their bomb runs.

=== Marking Mailly ===
The night was clear. Arriving on time, Shannon's position was confirmed by his navigator, who added "We're here Dave, but where are the Oboe flares?" An instant later a set of hooded illumination flares lit up the scene. The flares had been dropped by PFF Mosquitos at 5,000 feet, providing excellent visibility. A moment later Shannon witnessed Cheshire dropping his red target flares at the east end of the camp. Shannon circled at 3,5000 feet until he was called in to repeat the marking.

The marker flares had been dropped accurately, and burned brightly at the east end of the target. Satisfied with the marking, Cheshire radioed Deane, the Main Force Controller, to initiate the attack. Unknown to him, Deane was having difficulty receiving him. He did see the marking was accurate, and instructed his wireless operator to give the order to start the attack. He then circled above and waited for the destruction to begin. Nothing happened. No one received his transmission.

=== Milling at the assembly point ===
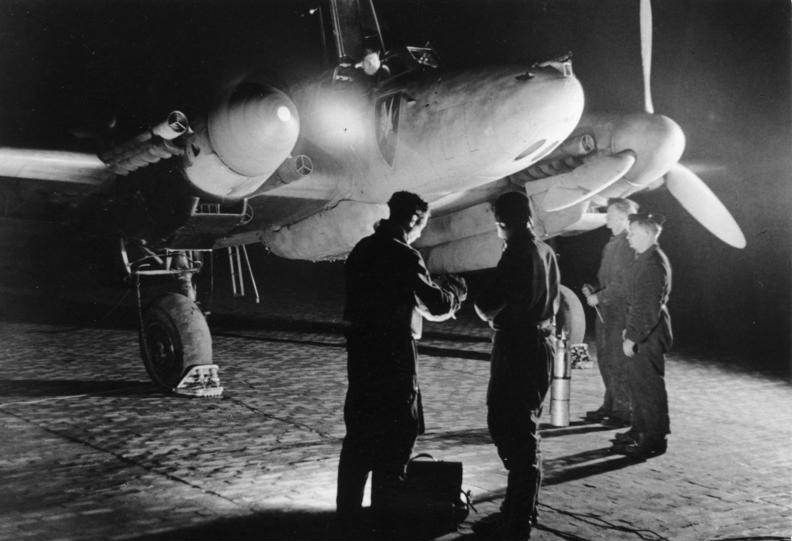
Bf 110 night-fighter is prepared for combat

While the bombers circled at the assembly point Luftwaffe nightfighters began to arrive on the scene, slipping in among the circling Lancasters. With their arrival losses began to mount, and impatience and indiscipline among the pilots began to set in. Radio silence, normally strictly observed, went by the wayside as pilots succumbed to the anxiety and frustration and gave voice to their displeasure. In Deane's post-action report he recounted "The order that RT silence be maintained was now being broken from all quarters, and the gist of the many messages addressed to me, some orderly but many others crudely blunt, was to inquire when they could bomb and get the hell out." One pilot was heard to say "Come on Master Bomber, pull your finger out" Though he heard them, his orders were to maintain radio silence, and he did so. Instead, he had his wireless operator repeat continuously the order to attack. After 5 or 6 minutes, the aircraft of 5 Group began making their attack runs. How this came about is not clear, as no one received the WT transmissions from Deane.

The point of an attack plan is to get the aircraft over the target and out of the danger area in the shortest amount of time possible. The delay of a few minutes may not seem like much, but it proved costly. The air combat over the assembly point was short, but intense. Crews reported seeing four or five Lancasters falling from the sky at a time. Sergeant Frank Broughton, the wireless operator in a 97 Squadron aircraft, slid out of his seat to take a peak out of the astrodome. There had been nothing in his briefing for him to expect the Main Force Controller to broadcast his orders by WT. In the next few minutes he witnessed six large explosions in their immediate vicinity, and realized that Lancasters were being blown to pieces all about him. "By heck, this is a bit rough" he offered.

The stream of aircraft orbiting the assembly point grew in size as the aircraft from 1 Group arrived on the scene. One of these was C-Charlie from 12 Squadron. Rear gunner Sergeant Dick Woodruff likened the scene to a swarm of gnats on a warm summer evening. The sky above the yellow markers was thick with Lancasters, and C-Charlie was in the middle of them. Ceaselessly swinging his turret from side to side, he saw twin-engined Messerschmitts and Junkers flying past, witnessed combat after combat, and saw one Lancaster after another fall out of the sky. He and the mid-upper gunner fired bursts at the passing shadows. A Lancaster moved close enough for him to see the large letters PH on the side of the fuselage, his own 12 Squadron code. In grim silence he witnessed the aircraft get caught in a stream of cannon fire, catch fire and fall to the earth.

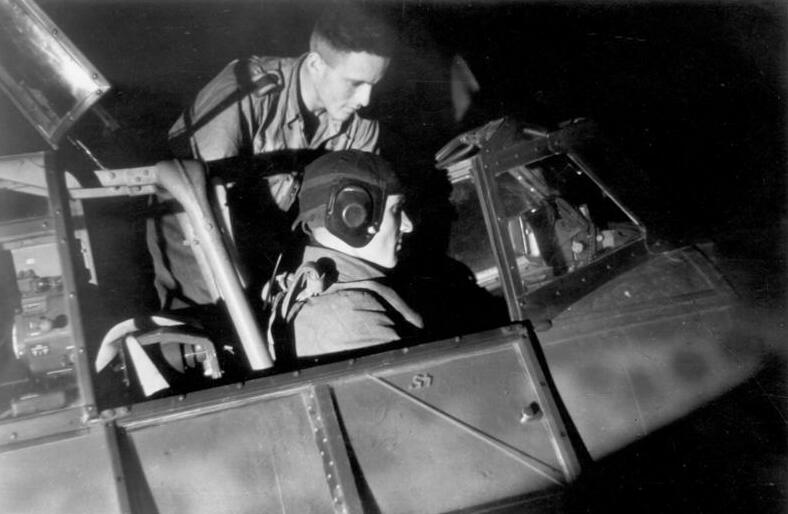
A Bf 110 nightfighter pilot is secured in prior to launch

Receiving no word to attack, Sparks assumed Deane had been shot down and took control. He began signaling the force to attack, initially with wireless signal, and then by radio transmission. Adding to the difficulties, there was a great deal of interference on their radio frequency. In an unfortunate twist of fate, US Armed Services Radio was broadcasting big band swing music that night on the same RT frequency that the RAF was using for the raid. Whether from the urging of Sparks or on their own initiative, 5 Group bombers started to deliver their loads on the target. The initial bombing was accurate and reasonably well concentrated.

Meanwhile, over the assembly point losses continued to mount. Said Cheshire: "I had never seen so many aircraft going down in so short a space of time, and I knew that this could only be because most of the available Luftwaffe night fighters were in the sky. With the bright moon and clear sky our aircraft would have little chance. To this day I can remember my near despair at finding no way of getting through either to the Controller or directly to the aircraft themselves." Weighing up the situation, Cheshire attempted to call off the attack and return the bombers to home. Cheshire reflected later "I was desperately trying to call the whole attack off, and none of the main force could hear me. They were not used to this method, and they were not receiving us."

By 00:16 the 5 Group aircraft should have completed their bombing runs and the Mosquitos of 617 Squadron should have had a clear run to place their second set of markers at the west end of the target. In fact, almost 2/3 of the first wave had yet to exit the assembly point. Nevertheless, it was time to mark again. Realizing this, Sparks attempted to halt the bombing, ordering his crews "Do not bomb - Wait." He was only partially successful.

=== Marking the western end ===
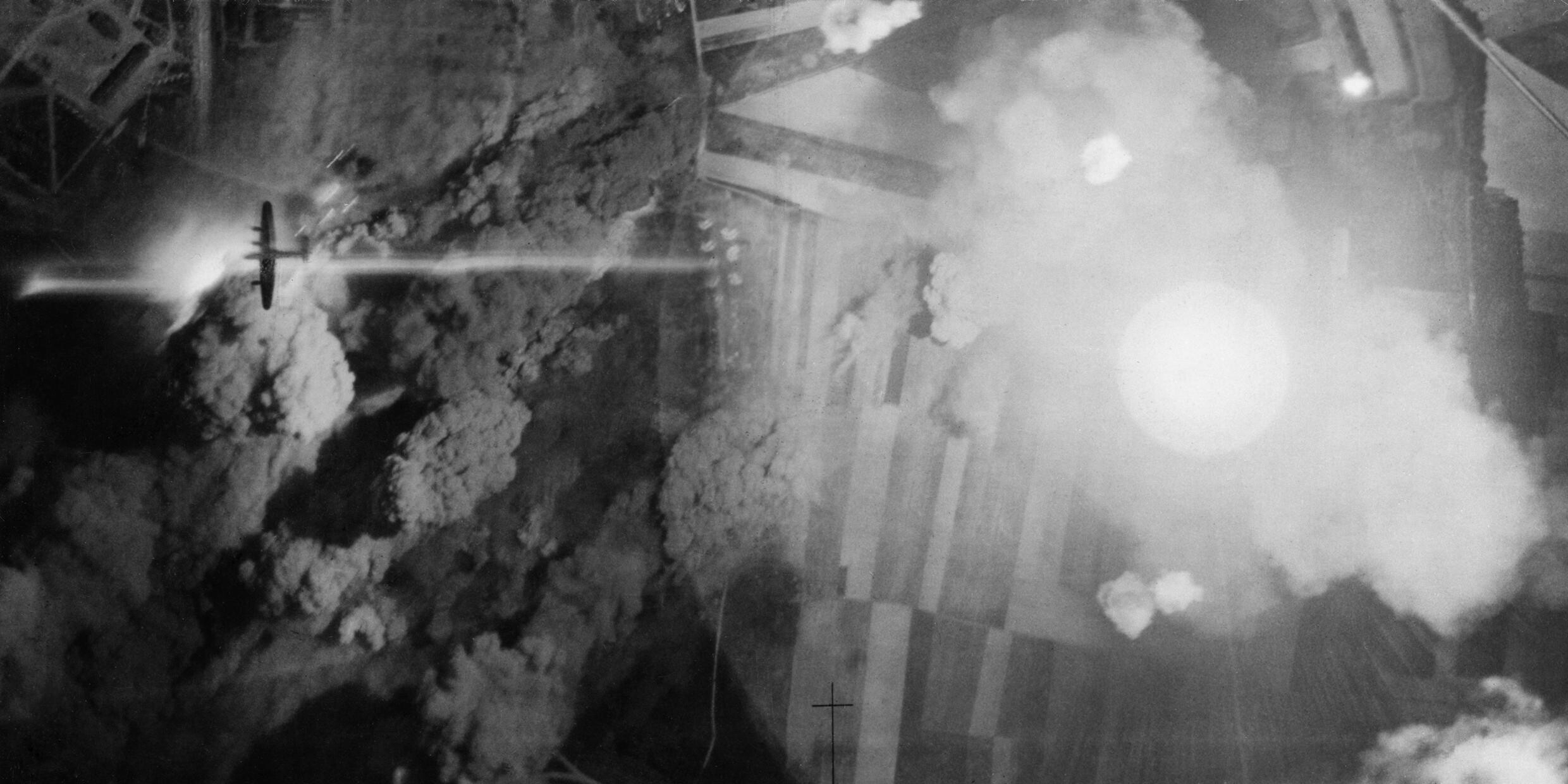
A low flying Lancaster is seen through the glare of a burning Mailly-le-Camp

As the time for the second marking approached Fawke and Keane maneuvered their Mosquitos to make their run. Not realizing there was a second marking point to be illuminated, Deane took this moment to attempt to refresh the original red markers. Flying his Lancaster across the target area at 2,000 feet, he believed there would be a pause in the bombing to allow the remarking of the east end. Unfortunately, no real pause occurred. He soon found his aircraft being tossed about mercilessly. "Never have I had such a rough flight in a Lancaster. It did everything but stand upright on its tail as each stick of bombs exploded underneath us. I discovered later that the aircraft of 1 Group were carrying 4,000 pounders, for which the safe height was 4,000 feet." It would seem Deane was unfamiliar with the bomb loads detailed for the mission. Every aircraft in both Groups assigned to bomb the target carried a 4,000-pound blockbuster, along with 15 or 16 HE bombs. The only exceptions were those in the marker squadrons, Deane's own 83 Squadron and 97 Squadron.

Observing the destruction going on at the assembly point, Cheshire wanted the whole force to just drop their bombs upon the east end markers. However, he was unable to raise Deane, so Cheshire ordered Kearns and Fawke to drop their secondary markers on the west end of the target as originally planned. Diving in from 5,000 feet, the two Mosquitos were soon buffeted by the ongoing explosions underneath them. At a quarter the weight of a Lancaster, the Mosquitos were tossed about much more violently. Fawke abandoned any thought of attempting a low level marking and released his flares at 2,000 feet, while Kearns let go at 3,000 feet. Even so, Kearns barely made it out. "I had just released my markers, checked 'bombs gone' and bomb-doors closed, when a bomb load exploded right in front of me. I don't even recall the next few seconds clearly, other than bright flashes, severe turbulence and the Mosquito being thrown all over the sky." After a few dicey moments he managed to regain control. Finding his navigator was uninjured, he pointed his aircraft for Woodhall Spa and home.

=== Remaining bomber force cleared to attack ===
As Kearns left Mailly the target area was cleared. The majority of 5 Group was still orbiting at the assembly point, as was most of all of 1 Group. Finally came the order which the pilots had been waiting for. "Rat Two, bomb. Come on, all you insolent bastards, everybody - bomb!" Most thought it was the voice of Cheshire, but in fact it was the Deputy Controller Neville Sparks. The time was 12:24, 15 minutes after they were scheduled to go in. Somehow the message got through. Said one pilot "When the order to attack was finally given, the waiting area looked like the starting post of the Epsom Derby." The force of heavy bombers headed to the target en masse, and the full weight of high explosives were dropped upon the camp. The recriminations ceased and the radios went silent, while the force headed south and away.

Within the camp the second pounding was far more intense than the first. The camp had a number of shelters and zig-zag slit trenches dug 6 feet deep to offer the panzer troops some measure of protection were the camp to come under attack. They were adequate protection against flying splinters, but were little help against the concussive blast of a 4,000-pound cookie. As the raid progressed the explosions caused the sides of the trenches to cave in, half burying the men inside. Survivors were faced with the dilemma of digging themselves out and being exposed, or staying half buried and hoping not to suffocate. After 15 minutes from the start of the bombing there was a sudden lessening in intensity. The shouts of NCOs could be heard calling out "All soldiers not in possession of their weapons, ammunition and field kits go and get them now. The rest of you - fight the fires. Move!" Those that could do so and hurried to obey were soon caught in the open by a far more intense second phase of bombardment.

From the French town of Mailly-le-Camp the view of the night sky was shocking. Claudette Marc recalled "Everything was illuminated brightly, and there was a constant hum in the sky. In the distance you could hear powerful explosions, and it seemed to us that in addition to the bombing, there was an intense air battle going on. Though it was just after midnight, it seemed like daybreak had already arrived. My parents were impressed, as were many of the residents of Faux-Fresnay."

For many 1 Group crews, the order to bomb came too late. However, the Panzer training camp at Mailly-le-Camp was devastated. The losses in buildings, materials and men were heavy. This was the kind of destruction German cities had been suffering under for over a year, but it was the first time the soldiers of the Wehrmacht were exposed to the heavy delivery of bombs that Bomber Command was beginning to master.

With bombs released the bombers began their return flight home, but continued to be pursued by German fighters. Some battles continued all the way to the coast. Remaining over the target until the last bombs had been dropped, the aircraft of Deputy Controller Sparks was caught by a night fighter and shot down.

== Aftermath ==
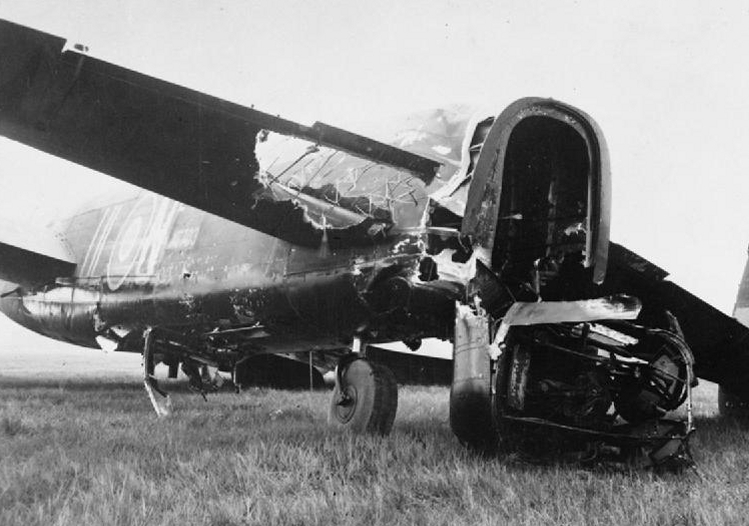
A badly damaged Lancaster managed to make it back to England following the Mailly-le-Camp mission

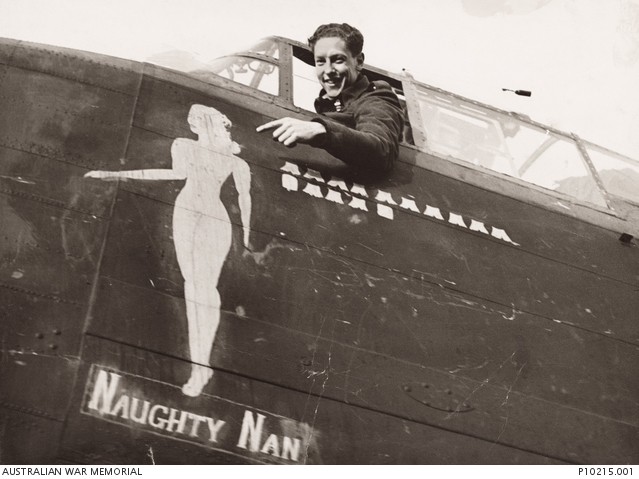
Pilot Officer Colin Dickson of 467 Squadron in 'Naughty Nan'. Dickson's Lancaster was lost near Mertz during his return flight from Mailly. It was one of 42 lost on the raid. Dickson and four others aboard were killed

The mission against the Panzer training center at Mailly-le-Camp was just one mission in a series of missions to soften up the German defenses in preparation for the D-Day landings. At Mailly had been a Panzer regiment headquarters unit, three panzer battalions that were refitting from units on the East Front, elements of two other panzer battalions, and the camp's training staff. Once underway, the bombing was accurate. Some 1,500 tons of high explosives were delivered on the camp, causing massive destruction. The training base at Mailly-le-Camp was largely leveled. Destroyed in the bombing were 114 barrack buildings, 47 transport sheds, 65 vehicles, and 37 tanks, while 218 instructors and soldiers were killed with 156 more being wounded.

The success of the mission came at a grievous cost. 42 Lancasters and their crews were lost, with another Lancaster written off upon returning to base. 5 Group lost 14 bombers on the mission, while 1 Group, making up the second wave, lost 28 aircraft. Communication problems were at the heart of their troubles. Unbeknownst to Deane, his wireless set was 30 kilocycles off frequency, making his Morse coded instructions over the WT unreadable. Many crews were not even aware that instructions from the Main Force Controller were to come over the wireless. Communication difficulties were exacerbated by interference from an American Armed Forces radio broadcast, whose powerful transmission was on the same channel as the RT for the bombardment groups.

The delay in the attack by just a few minutes allowed the German night fighters to get in among the bombers, resulting in heavy casualties. At 11.6%, the loss rate was prohibitive. Such losses were as bad as those suffered in the hardest raids flown against such heavily defended targets as Berlin or the Ruhr. However, the losses were suffered in a much shorter period of time. The majority of the air combat occurred at the assembly point, and was over in 30 minutes. A number of experten who were able to slip in among the bombers were able to make multiple kills close together. Dietrich Schmidt of 8/NJG-1 scored 3 victories in 30 minutes before damage to his aircraft from defensive fire required he and his crew to bail out. Martin Drewes of III/NJG-1 achieved 5 victories in 45 minutes. Helmut Bergman of 8/NJG-4 scored 6 victories in 30 minutes. Fw 190s of I/SKG-10 accounted for six victories. The intensity of the combat was the most notable feature of the air battle.

Non-military casualties were few. Post-war investigations by the RAF confirmed that none of the bombs dropped fell in the nearby French towns. The civilian deaths that did occur, including the 16 that died in Poivres and the 5 at Trouan-le-Petit in the Aube, were killed when they were struck by the debris of destroyed aircraft.

A week later on 10 May 1944 a 5 Group mission to Lille had to be paused in mid mission when the target indicators were extinguished by bomb explosions. During the delay of remarking 12 bombers were shot down, a 13% loss rate. Following these two missions the 1/3 op rule for missions to France was abandoned.

The mission gave critics the chance to claim Cheshire's low level marking technique would not work for Main Force operations without grievous loss. However, Cheshire was not in charge of the bombing mission. That was the responsibility of Deane. Cheshire was only placed in charge of the marking of the target, which was completed on time and accurately. The fact that the two men attended separate briefings may have contributed to the confusion over the target, as neither one seemed fully aware of the full picture, including the involvement of 1 Group's Special Duty Flight, which had been assigned its own marking target. The problem of delay was due to confusion over the execution of the mission, amplified by the communication break down between the controllers and the bombers. Said Cheshire "You have got to have good communications."

Afterwards, Rice bitterly regretted having committed his Group to this mission. His fledgling marker unit was disbanded two months later, and the crews returned to the main bombing force. In February 1945 Rice was replaced by Air Vice Marshal Robert Blucke. Rice was transferred to the command of No. 7 (Operational Training) Group, which handled the heavy conversion units.

On the men that flew the mission, author and Bomber Command veteran Jack Currie wrote:

What has to be remembered about Mailly-le-Camp is that, with all hell bubbling up around them and their fabric of existence hanging by a thread, the great majority of captains and crews gritted their teeth and waited for the order. In that, they won a greater battle than the one they had been briefed for. And when at last they were allowed to turn their sights toward the target, there were no more malfunctions and no more mistakes. Then, the bomber crews kept faith with their tradition, and with their comrades - with the fifty-five thousand who had died in other battles, and with those who would fly on until the war was won.

Some crews of shot down aircraft survived, including that of the Deputy Controller Ned Sparks. Shot down as he began to exit the target area, he and his crew were all able to parachute to safety. Sparks was able to link up with the French Resistance and made it back to England seven weeks later. His arrival at RAF Coningsby came as a complete surprise, as no one thought he would be seen again, and a celebration was thrown in his honour. Sparks received no recognition from the Air Ministry for his service at Mailly.

Most of the 258 airmen who were killed are buried in Mailly-le-Camp and the surrounding villages. An annual commemorative service for the airmen, the French civilians who lost their lives and the French Resistance is held in Mailly-le-Camp.
