= Schnellkampfgeschwader 10 =

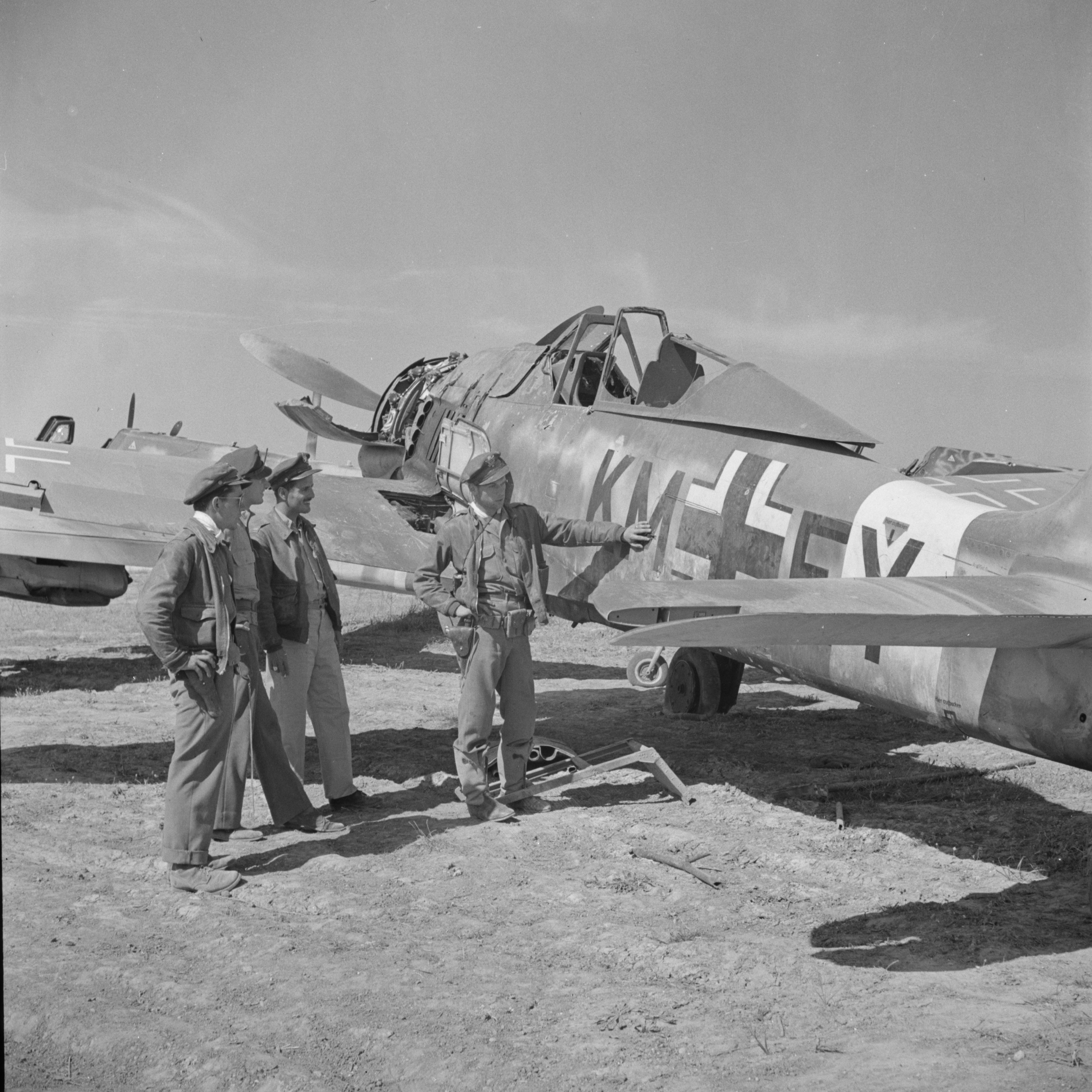
- A damaged Focke-Wulf Fw 190 A-4 (KM+EY) of III./SKG 10 at El Aouina airport, Tunis, Tunisia, May 1943
- Active: 1942–1943
- Country: Nazi Germany
- Branch: Luftwaffe
- Type: Bomber wing
- Role: Tactical
- Size: Air Force Wing

Insignia
- Identification symbol: Geschwaderkennung of G3

Schnellkampfgeschwader 10 (SKG 10) was a Luftwaffe fast bomber wing of the Second World War. The unit was initially created with three Gruppen (groups) in December 1942 at Saint-André-de-l'Eure Airport and augmented by a fourth group on 10 April 1943.

The Stab (headquarters unit) was transferred on 18 October 1943 and formed the core of Schlachtgeschwader 10.

10.(Jabo)/JG 2 and 10.(Jabo)/JG 26 were amalgamated into Schnellkampfgeschwader 10 which initially flew night bombing operations over southern England, operating under the authority of Angriffsführer England under the command of Dietrich Peltz.

The unit suffered heavy casualties from the RAF night fighters. On the night of 16/17 April 1943, four Fw 190s attempting to attack London got lost over Kent. Three of them tried to land at RAF West Malling: Yellow H of 7./SKG 10, flown by Feldwebel Otto Bechtold landed and was captured, his Fw 190 later being evaluated by the RAE at Farnborough; a Fw 190 of 5./SKG 10 flown by Lt. Fritz Sezter landed minutes later. When Setzer realised his mistake and attempted to take off, his aircraft was then destroyed by an armoured car. A third Fw 190 undershot the runway and was destroyed, the injured pilot becoming a POW. A fourth Fw 190 crashed at Staplehurst, killing the pilot.

The II. and III. Gruppe were transferred to Schlachtgeschwader 4 in October 1943, IV. Gruppe was posted to Schlachtgeschwader 10. In December 1942 III./ZG 2 was redesignated III./SKG 10.

The unit was transferred to Italy in July 1943, operating against Allied shipping between Sicily and North Africa, but with occasional audacious raids on Allied airfields.

The I. Gruppe remained in France under the control of II. Fliegerkorps. Due to the lack of regular night fighters in France, it was decided in April 1944 to employ I./SKG 10 on Wilde Sau missions over North Western France and Belgium during full-moon periods. The group's most successful outing was on the night of 3/4 May, when Fw 190s of I/SKG-10 accounted for six victories in the air combat during the night raid against the panzer training center at Mailly-le-Camp. I. Gruppe was put under the control IX. Fliegerkorps in 1944 and operated against the Allied troops during the Normandy Invasion in June 1944. Two Fw 190 pilots of I./SKG 10 were over the landings at dawn on a reconnaissance mission, and claimed four Avro Lancasters shot down.

The I. Gruppe was transferred to Kampfgeschwader 51 where it operated as its III. Gruppe and was officially redesignated as such on 20 October 1944.

== Geschwaderkommodore ==
- Major Günther Tonne, December 1942 – 15 July 1943
- Major Helmut Viedebantt (acting), July 1943

== Bibliography ==
- Arthy, Andrew; Jessen, Morten (2023). "Patton Versus the Jabos: Focke-Wulf Fw 190 Jagdbomber Operations over Sicily, August 9, 1943". The Aviation Historian (44): 18–26. ISSN 2051-1930.
- Bowman, Martin German Night Fighters vs Bomber Command: 1943-1945 South Yorkshire: Pen & Sword Books Ltd. (2016).
- de Zeng, H.L; Stankey, D.G; Creek, E.J. Bomber Units of the Luftwaffe 1933–1945; A Reference Source, Volume 1. Ian Allan Publishing, 2007. ISBN 978-1-85780-279-5
