= Souther Field =

Former military airfield in Sumter County, Georgia

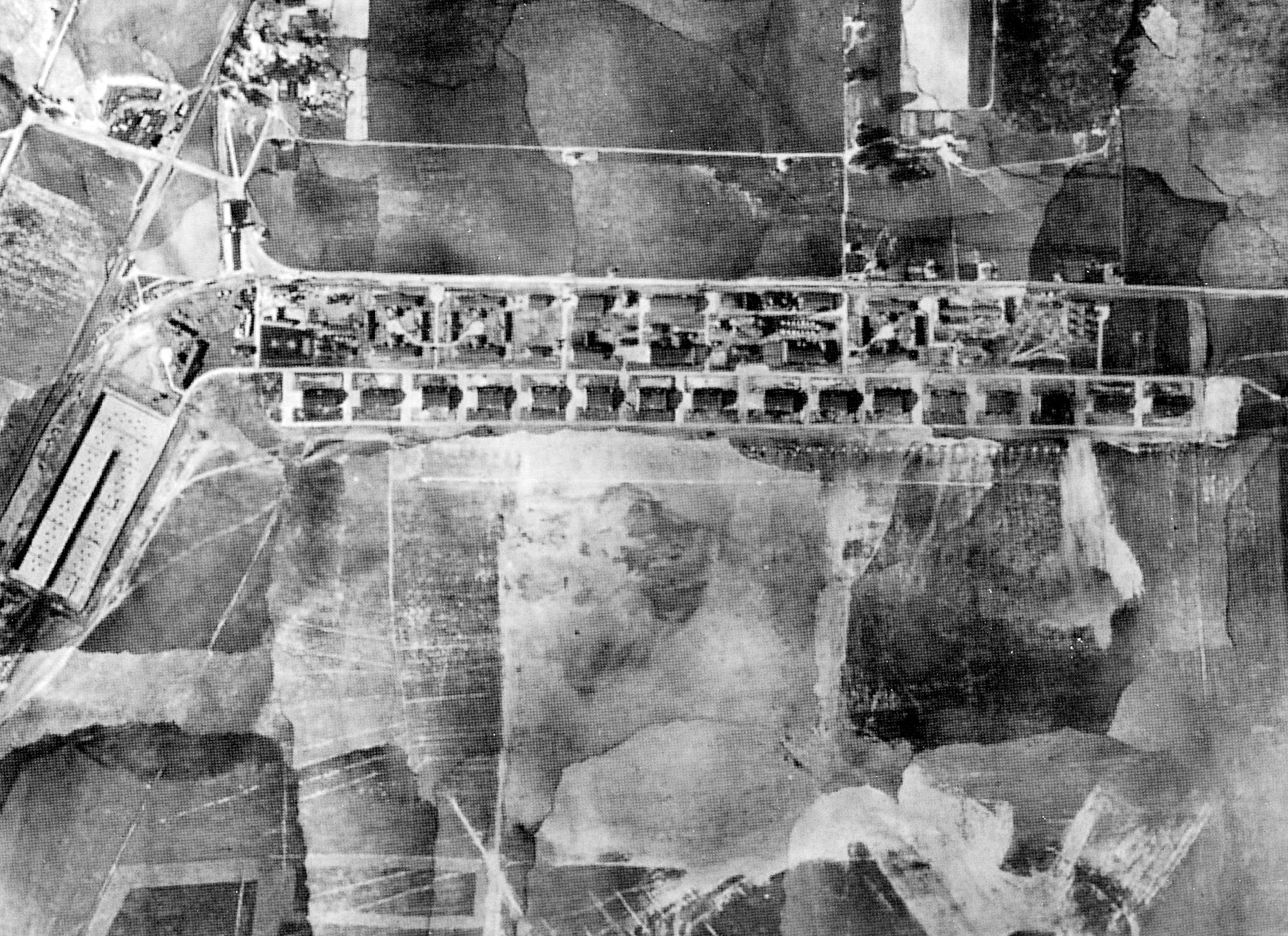
- Souther Field in 1918 at the end of World War I.

Site information
- Type: Pilot training airfield
- Controlled by: Air Service, United States Army; United States Army Air Forces
- Condition: Civil Airport/Urban area

Location
- Location within Georgia
- Coordinates: 32°06′38″N 84°11′19″W

Site history
- Built: 1918
- In use: 1918–1946
- Battles/wars: World War I World War II

Garrison information
- Garrison: Training Section, Air Service (World War I); Army Air Force Training Command (World War I)

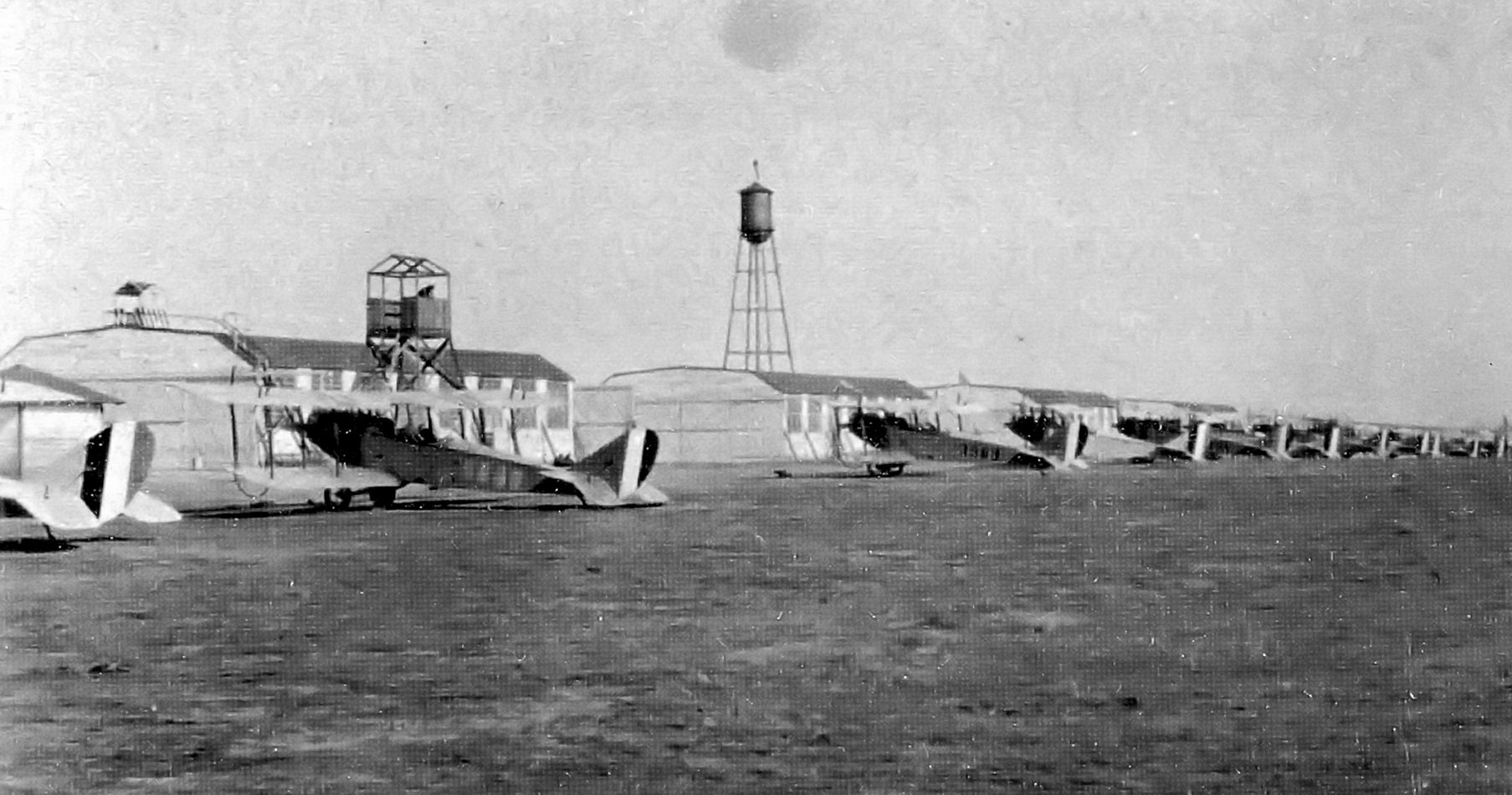
Souther Field – Curtiss JN-4s on the line in front of a row of hangars, 1918

Souther Field is a former military airfield, located 3.7 miles (6.0 km) Northeast of Americus, Georgia. It was one of thirty-two Air Service training camps established after the United States entry into World War I in April 1917.

After World War II, the property was sold to the city of Americus. Most of the airfield was developed into a civil airport. In 1948 a portion of Souther Field was chartered for the South Georgia Trade and Vocational School (later South Georgia Technical College).

== History ==
The base was named Souther Field, being named after Henry Souther, of Hartford, Connecticut. Souther was head of the Aircraft Engineering Division of the Air Service when he died in August 1917 after a brief illness contracted while acting as director of Langley Field, Virginia. At Langley, he was experimenting and testing aircraft with various engines when he died.

=== World War I ===
Its history begins in 1918, when on 19 January, the War Department leased 407 acres (165 ha) 4.5 miles (7.2 km) north of the center of Americus, Georgia from Sumter County for a primary training airfield and an aviation supply depot. The Air Service named the facility Souther Field in honor of Major Henry Souther who served as consulting engineer on many of the World War I aviation projects. Major Souther had been killed earlier in the line of duty at Fort Monroe, Virginia.

The contract for construction of the airfield and base was let on 7 February 1918 to J.B. McCray Company of Atlanta, and work was begun on the 19th. The flying field and the station area had to be graded and cleared before any construction could be done. There were about 1,200 men involved in the construction work. When completed, the base consisted of warehouses, accommodations for 2,000 officers and men, 15 wooden hangars, and a hospital plus other structures.

The first aircraft to land on the field were Standard J-1s powered by Hall Scott motors from Maxwell Field, Alabama. However, Curtiss Jennys, manufactured in Canada, became the first aircraft assigned to the field. Shortly thereafter, 71 more Jennys from the Curtiss factory in Buffalo, New York also arrived. The first 25 cadets reported on 29 May 1918. An additional class of 25 cadets arrived every week until the signing of the armistice. The high-water mark saw 125 officers, 1,400 men, and 147 aircraft at the field. Souther logged more flying hours than any other Army airfield during the war.

Souther Field was accepted by the Army and officially opened on 4 July 1918. When completed, the facility had schools, a YMCA, a fire department, electric lighting, underground sewers, water lines, telephones, a railroad spur, hospital, post office, barracks, mess halls and other infrastructure. On 17 June a small cyclone struck the airfield from the northeast. Training units assigned to Souther Field were:

- Post Headquarters, Souther Field – October 1919
- 5th Aero Squadron, May 1917

Re-designated as Squadron "A", July–November 1918

- 116th Aero Squadron, March 1918

Re-designated as Squadron "B", July–November 1918

- 236th Aero Squadron, April 1918

Re-designated as Squadron "C", July–November 1918

- 237th Aero Squadron, April 1918

Re-designated as Squadron "D", July–November 1918

- Flying School Detachment (Consolidation of Squadrons A–D), November 1918 – November 1919

After the end of the conflict, the War Department deactivated the field and sold its surplus airplanes to the public. The main activity at the airfield had become the surplus airplane auctions. Souther Field was completing its transition from a pilot training base to a mecca for would-be barnstormers looking for a deal on an airplane still in the crate. The auctions were continuous. Big-time buyers could snap up a load of Jennys for about fifty dollars apiece. Altimeters could be bought in lots of 200 for around a dime each and propellers were going for around twenty-six cents.

One of the surplus aircraft buyers was none other than Charles Lindbergh. In May 1923, Lindbergh paid $500 for a Jenny with a brand-new OX-5 engine, a new paint job, and an extra 20 gal. gasoline tank. He had over 100 Jenny airplanes to choose from. Lindbergh took the plane out to the field and taxied around for a while, getting the feel of it. Although he had some dual instruction time to his credit, he did not advertise the fact that he had not actually soloed. After nearly dinging up the plane with an attempted takeoff, he taxied back to the hangars and asked Mr. Messer if he would ride with him. A few hours later, Messer exited the craft satisfied that his student would do fine but he suggested that Mr. Lindbergh wait till later in the afternoon when the wind had calmed. Later that day, Charles Lindbergh made his first solo flight above the cotton fields near Americus. A few days later, he boarded the plane again and set off for Montgomery to begin his barnstorming career.

In 1928, Sumter County purchased the property.

=== World War II ===
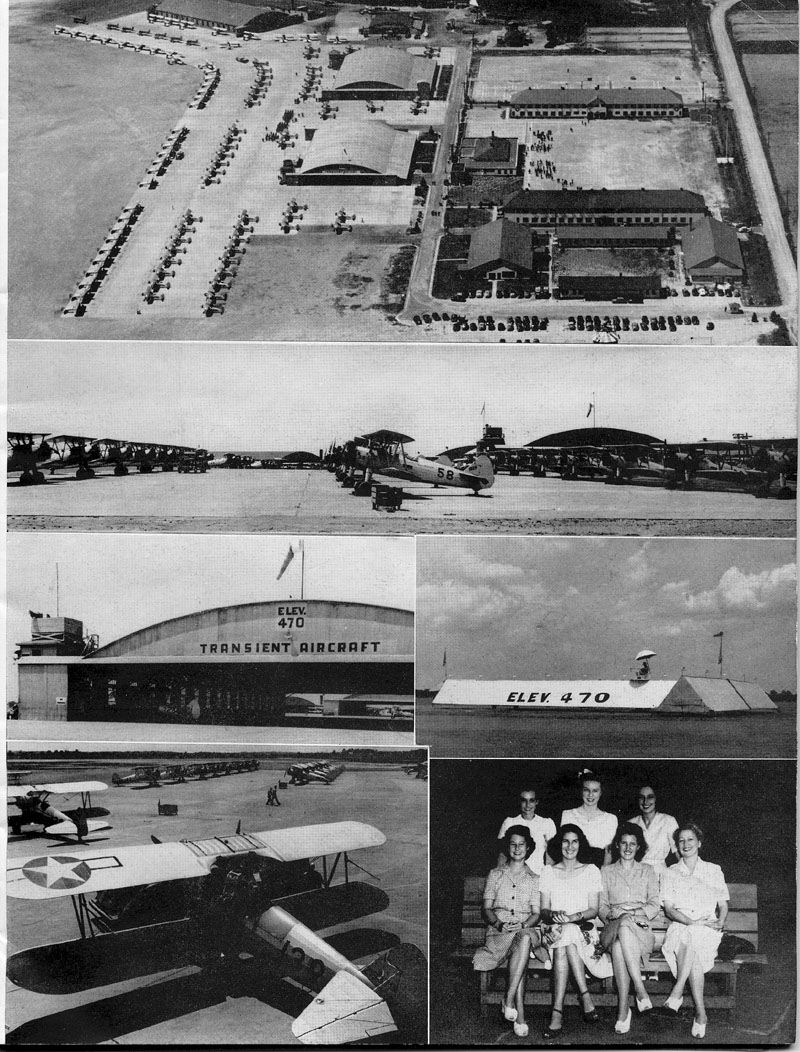
Scenes of Souther Field during 1944

William J. Graham of Pittsburgh, Pennsylvania founded the Graham Aviation Company in April 1938. By the end of 1940, Graham Aviation managed eight airports in western Pennsylvania and operated several pilot schools as well as one flight instructor school. The Army Air Corps asked Graham if he would consider establishing a Contract Pilot School. A pilot, who had trained at Souther during World War I, suggested the former airfield to Graham for his school. Graham and his staff came to Americus and inspected the site. Finding it satisfactory, he leased the property from Sumter County.

Construction of the new contract training field began in December 1940 initially consisting of one barracks, a mess hall, a workshop hangar, and a 138 ft × 204 ft (42 m × 62 m) steel hangar. The necessity of removing the concrete foundations of the World War I buildings slowed construction. The Instructor training program began on February 1, 1941 with five St. Louis Steel Car Company PT-15s. The PT-15 is virtually indistinguishable from the PT-17 Stearman except by the trained eye. The Air Corps bought a total of 14 for evaluation purposes. On 15 March the school received its first 10 PT-17 Stearmans.

Officially the 56th Army Air Forces Flying Training Detachment, the school's contract called for training classes of 50 students. The first class began ground school on March 22, 1941. Meanwhile, the Army Air Corps modified Graham's contract for the training of British Royal Air Force cadets. The first class of RAF students arrived from Canada on a train in early June. Local citizens warmly greeted the Brits as they bused through Americus to the school.

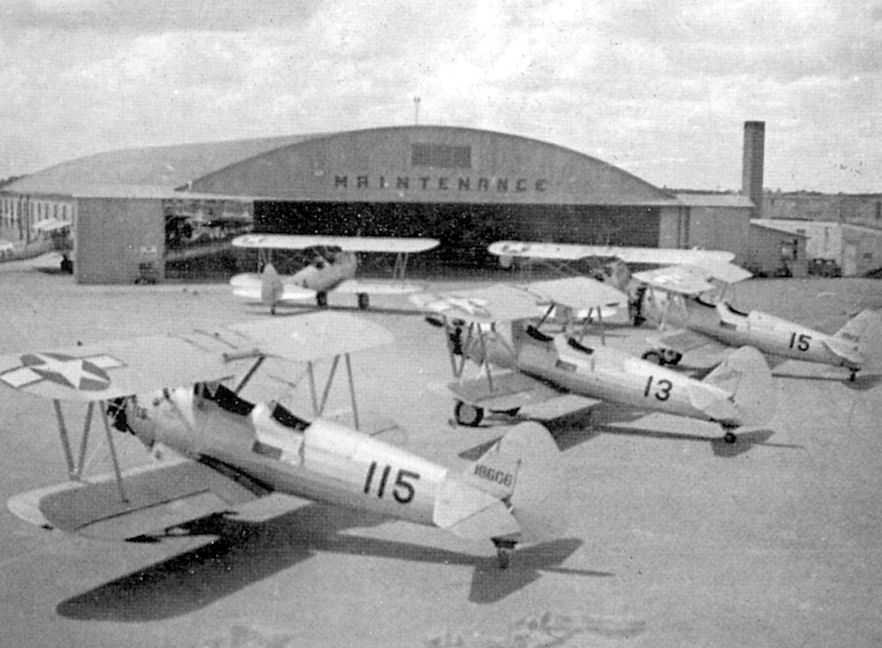
Maintenance hangar at Souther Field, Georgia, 1943

Jack Currie, a young RAF cadet who soloed at Souther in early 1942, survived the war, and wrote a successful series of books about his experiences. One of his books, "Wings Over Georgia," recounts in detail his training at Souther.

With the United States entry into the war, the Defense Plant Corporation bought Graham's investment in Souther. An enlargement of the school facilities also got underway for the planned increase in training. Ultimately, the school occupied 644 acres (261 ha) with three hangars. The cantonment area contained two two-story barracks, a recreational ball, an exchange, administration building, Link trainer building, ground school building, mess hall, cold storage plant and a hospital. The school had two auxiliary fields. The British cadets departed Souther in the fall of 1942 with the training of American cadets resuming on September 13, 1942.

By the end of 1942, the number of PT-17s present had increased to 107. From January 1, 1943 to January 31, 1944, 2,073 students trained at Souther. The school reached its peak in the winter of 1943/44 with 600 cadets on board and over 450 civil employees that included over 100 flight instructors. Aircraft present reached its zenith with 122 PT-17s, four Fairchild PT-19s, and one BT-13 Valiant, used by the instructors and staff. When the last class graduated in October 1944, the school closed.

In 1944, Souther Army Airfield became a site for German prisoners of war, who worked on the farms in the area. The army deactivated Souther Field at the end of World War II and deeded the land to Americus.

In 2009, Souther Field was renamed Jimmy Carter Regional Airport in honor of the former President who lived in nearby Plains.

== See also ==
- Georgia World War II Army Airfields
- List of Training Section Air Service airfields
- 29th Flying Training Wing (World War II)
