= South Georgia Technical College =

Public community college in Americus, Georgia, United States

Coordinates: 32.11753°N 84.18845°W

- Type: Public community college
- Established: 1948
- Affiliations: GJCAA (Region XVII)
- President: John Watford
- Academic staff: 90
- Students: 1,795 (fall 2024)
- Location: Americus, Georgia, United States
- Campus: Urban (small town); 1,000 acres (4 km²)
- Colors: Red and Black
- Nickname: Jets
- Mascot: ACE - Fighter Pilot
- Website: www.southgatech.edu

South Georgia Technical College (SGTC) is a public community college in Americus, Georgia. It has a satellite campus in Cordele, Georgia. SGTC serves many neighboring counties including Macon, Sumter, Marion, Schley, Taylor, Webster, and Crisp County.

== History ==
Originally, SGTC served as the Air Force training facility during World War I and World War II, otherwise known as Souther Field. In fact, Charles A. Lindbergh purchased his first plane (a Jenny) from Souther Field. Lindbergh would later gain international recognition as the first person to fly from New York to Paris nonstop in "The Spirit of St. Louis" in 1927. In 1948, the school was named South Georgia Trade and Vocational School. The phrase "trade school" was later removed in 1963. After the change, the school was labeled the South Georgia Technical and Vocational School. The school name changed once more as a result of 1988 a legislative act, though its current name did not become official until Governor Roy Barnes enacted the Educational Reform Bill on November 2, 2000.

== Location ==
South Georgia Technical College is located on the outskirts of Americus, in Sumter County, Georgia just southwest of interstate 75. The small town is a part of Sumter County Historic District, because of its history in railroad and technological advances during the mid-1800s. Thanks to local attorney Samuel H. Hawkins Americus was known as the Metropolis of Southwest Georgia because of its major cotton distribution. The college is 32 miles from the larger city of Albany, Georgia and approximately 2.5 hours away from the state's capital Atlanta.
