= RAF Ansty =

Former RAF base in Warwickshire, England

RAF Ansty
- Near Ansty, Warwickshire in England

Site information
- Type: Royal Air Force station
- Owner: Air Ministry
- Operator: Royal Air Force
- Controlled by: RAF Flying Training Command

Location
- Shown within Warwickshire RAF Ansty (the United Kingdom)
- Coordinates: 52°25′45″N 001°24′31″W

Site history
- Built: 1935
- In use: 1936 - 1953

Airfield information
- Elevation: 381 feet (116 m) AMSL
Runways
Direction	Length and surface
03/21	3,703 feet (1,129 m) Asphalt
08/26	3,488 feet (1,063 m) Asphalt

Royal Air Force Ansty, or more simply RAF Ansty, is a former Royal Air Force station located near the village of Ansty, 5 miles (8 km) east of Coventry city centre, Warwickshire, England, 7 miles (11 km) north-west of Rugby, Warwickshire. The airfield was opened in 1936, and after training many pupils closed in 1953.

== History ==
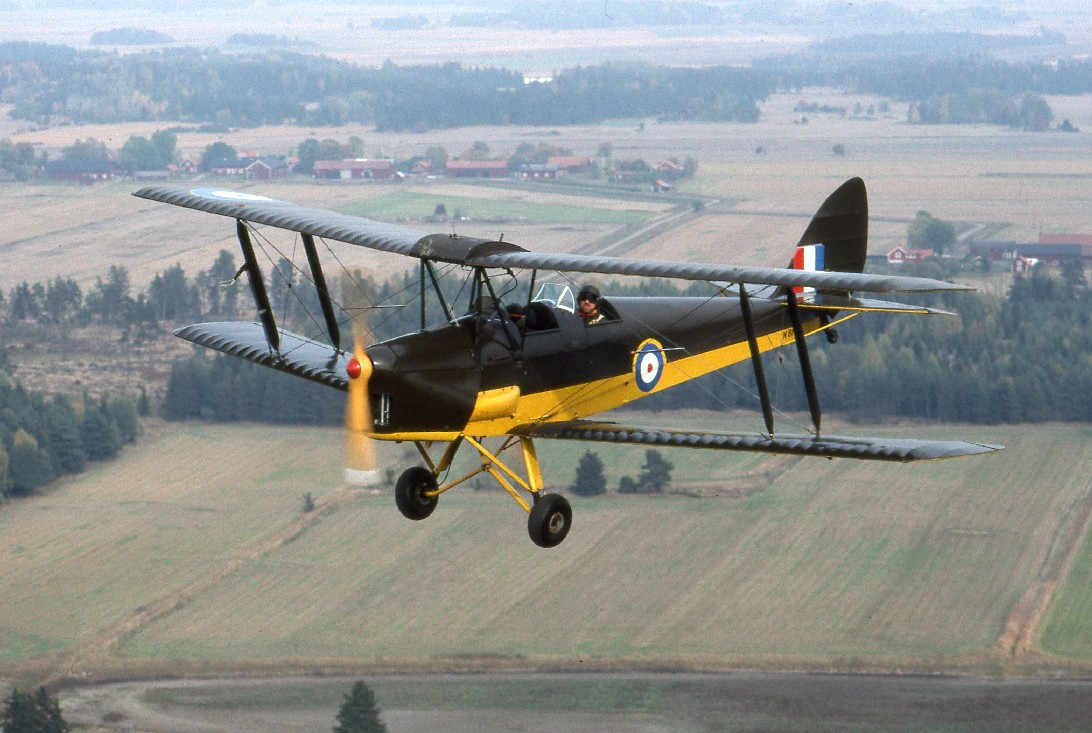
A DH-82A Tiger Moth similar to the ones that flew from the airfield.

The airfield was mainly used for schools with taught navigation and flying to new recruits using a varied range of aircraft such as de Havilland Tiger Moths and Avro Ansons. The first school teaching navigation to arrive was No. 4 Civilian Air Navigation School RAF with the Anson between September 1938 and October 1939 before being renamed No. 4 Air Observer Navigation School RAF (AONS) using Blackburn Bothas as an additional aircraft type between September 1939 and July 1940 before moving to another airfield.

The other schools were used for flying training with the first school arriving on 6 January 1936 which was the No. 9 Elementary and Reserve Flying Training School RAF which flew Ansons, Hawker Harts, Hawker Hinds, Tiger Moths and Saro Clouds. The school was operated by Air Services Training, under contract from the Air Ministry. The school was renamed the No. 9 Elementary Flying Training School RAF on 3 September 1939 days after the Second World War broke out. The school used Moths until 31 March 1944 which provided initial assessment before pupil pilots were sent abroad in the British Commonwealth Air Training Plan which was operated by Air Service Training.

One of the pilots who received his initial training at Ansty was Jack Currie, who, many years after the war, wrote a successful series of books about his air force experiences. After Ansty, Currie's subsequent training was in the United States.

A number of maintenance units used the site for a small amount of time like when a sub site of No. 27 Maintenance Unit RAF joined in October 1940 and No. 48 MU which used the airfield for temporary dispersal between 1940 and February 1941. After the Second World War the airfield hosted No. 2 Basic Flying Training School RAF, equipped with the de Havilland Canada DHC-1 Chipmunk from 21 March 1951 until 31 March 1953 operated by Air Service Training.

== The Coventry Blitz ==
The first bombs of the war dropped in the vicinity of Coventry were when five dropped on RAF Ansty on 25 June 1940. There were no casualties. This was two days before any civilians were killed near Coventry, when the Hillfields area was bombed and 16 people died.

== Accidents and incidents ==
During life as a RAF training base accidents were not far away with a number of airmen killed during training.

Date	Incident	Reference
February 1940	During WW2 aircraft maintenance units tried using this airfield for storage purposes but apparently it was often water-logged. There is a story that six Blackburn Botha types flown in to Ansty from Hawarden in February 1940 may have sunk in so deep they were never rescued.	
5 March 1941	A Tiger Moth of 9 EFTS was landing when it collided with another Tiger Moth on the ground. Both were burnt out, but there were no casualties.	
14 May 1941	Tiger Moths N5456 and N5472 of 9 EFTS are recorded as crashing.	
8 July 1941	Tiger Moth N6649 of 9 EFTS hit a bus on approach.	
1 August 1941	A pair of Tiger Moths from 9 EFTS collided in the air at Whitley.	
16 February 1942	A pair of Tiger Moths from 9 EFTS collided near the airfield	
29 May 1943	Tiger Moth R4921 of 9 EFTS crashed near the airfield after engine failure.	

== Current use ==
Rolls-Royce currently occupies the majority of the site as an engine overhaul and repair facility. The company won a contract overhauling the EJ2000 engine, which is used in the Eurofighter Typhoon with some of the work being performed at Ansty, which will also help to keep 3,000 jobs for the company throughout the country.

The northern side has been turned into a business park called Ansty Park, companies on the site include AVL, MTC, Sainsburys, London Electric Vehicle Company, HTRC, Cadent Gas and Fanuc Robotics.
