= Mailly-le-Camp =

Commune in Grand Est, France

- Commune
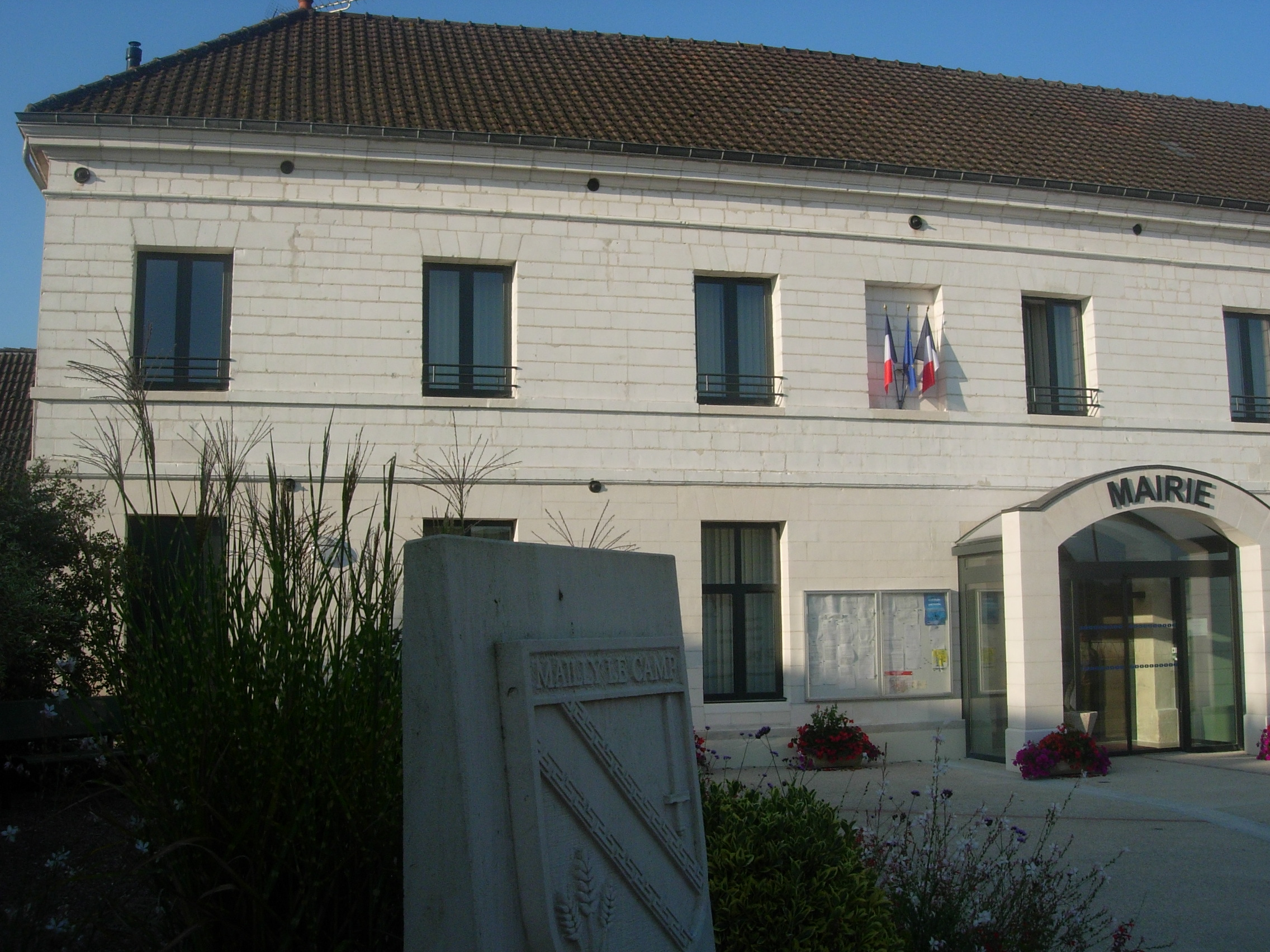
- Town hall

- Coat of arms
- Location of Mailly-le-Camp
- Location within France Location within Grand Est
- Coordinates: 48°40′07″N 4°12′28″E
- Country: France
- Region: Grand Est
- Department: Aube
- Arrondissement: Troyes
- Canton: Arcis-sur-Aube

Government
  - Mayor (2020–2026): Jean-Claude Robert
- Area^{1}: 42.7 km^{2} (16.5 sq mi)
- Elevation: 120 m (390 ft)
- Highest elevation: 202 m (663 ft)
- Lowest elevation: 118 m (387 ft)
- Population (2023): 2,015
  - Density: 47.2/km^{2} (122/sq mi)
- Time zone: UTC+01:00 (CET)
  - Summer (DST): UTC+02:00 (CEST)
- INSEE/Postal code: 10216 /10230
- ^{1} French Land Register data, which excludes lakes, ponds, glaciers > 1 km^{2} (0.386 sq mi or 247 acres) and river estuaries.

Mailly-le-Camp (French pronunciation: [maji lə kɑ̃]) is a commune in the Aube department in north-central France.

== History ==
The town is mentioned as Mailliacus for the first time in 859 AD document.

In 1902 a large military camp was built in its territory.

On 3–4 May 1944, during the German occupation of France, the panzer training camp located a mile north of the town was subjected to a very heavy bombing. The attack was a part of the preparation for the Allied invasion at Normandy, (Operation Overlord). 346 British Avro Lancasters and 14 de Havilland Mosquitoes of RAF Bomber Command were sent to attack the German panzer training center near the village of Mailly-le-Camp. The plan was for targeting aircraft to fly over at low level while the main force of Lancaster bombers orbited some distance away. Once the master bomber was satisfied with the marking the bomb force was to be called in. Although the target was accurately marked, the master bomber was unable to call in the force due to interference over the force's frequency with a USO broadcast and also by unnecessary chatting between nervous pilots. This led to a delay in the main force attack. While they were orbiting, fighter aircraft of the Luftwaffe began to arrive and attack the main force bombers. 42 Lancasters were shot down, 11.6% of the force, resulting in the loss of some 300 aircrew. However 1500 tons of bombs were dropped on the camp, causing considerable damage to the weapons and equipment held there and heavy casualties. No French civilians were killed in the bombing, although there were a small number of casualties when one of the Lancasters shot down crashed on a house.

== Population ==
Historical population
Year	Pop.	±% p.a.
1968	1,490	—
1975	1,593	+0.96%
1982	1,589	−0.04%
1990	1,375	−1.79%
1999	1,423	+0.38%
2007	1,624	+1.67%
2012	1,787	+1.93%
2017	1,579	−2.44%
2023	2,015	+4.15%
Source: INSEE

== See also ==
- Communes of the Aube department
