= Jack Currie (RAF officer) =

RAF officer and writer (1921–1996)

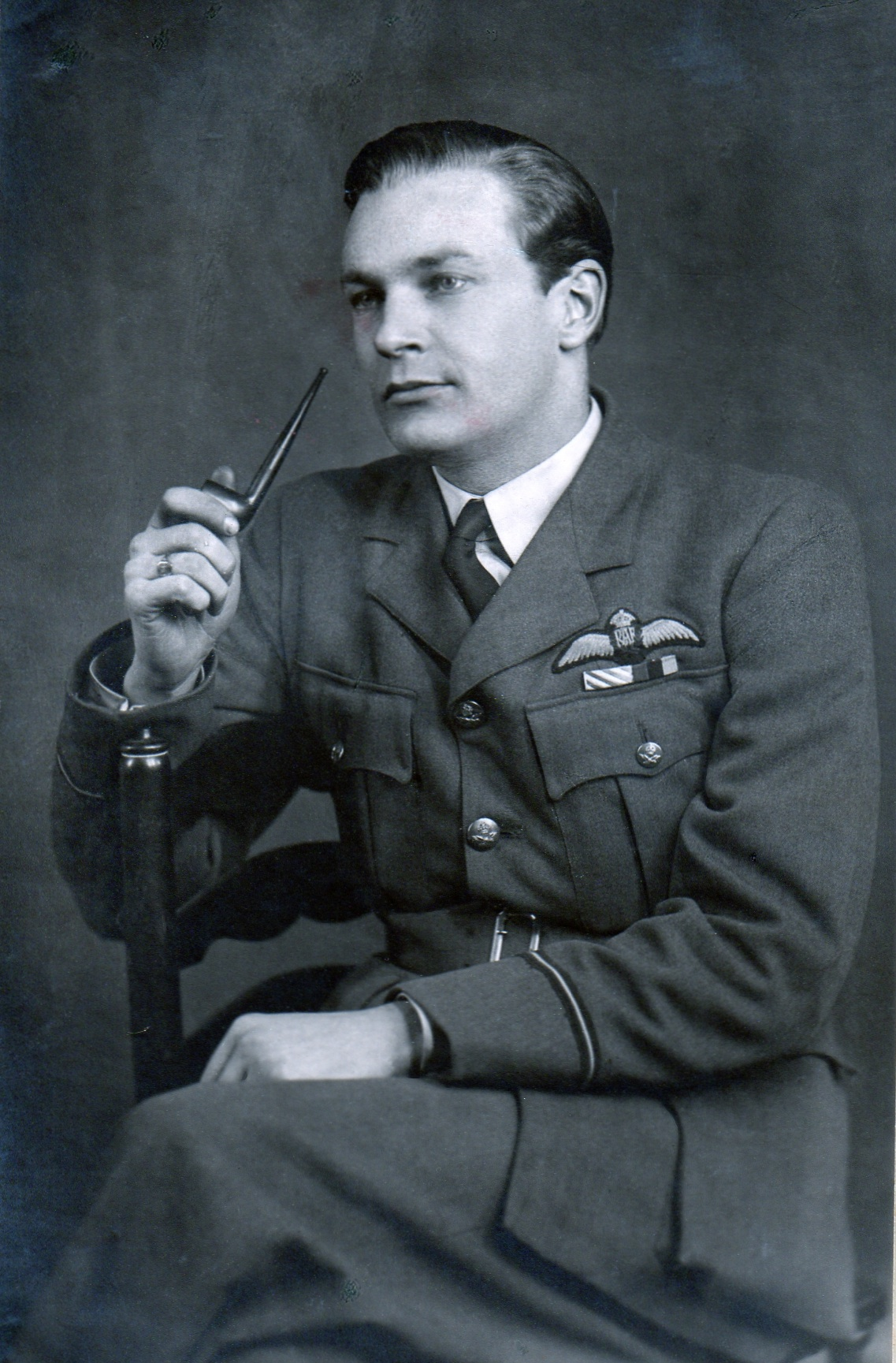
- Jack Currie in 1944
- Born: 7 December 1921; Sheffield, England
- Died: 19 October 1996 (aged 74); North Yorkshire, England
- Military career
- Allegiance: United Kingdom
- Branch: Royal Air Force
- Service years: 1941–1964
- Rank: Squadron Leader
- Nickname: Jack
- Conflicts: Second World War
- Awards: Distinguished Flying Cross

John Anthony Logan Currie, DFC (7 December 1921 – 19 October 1996) was an officer in the Royal Air Force (RAF) and an author. After serving during the Second World War, he stayed on in the RAF and attained the rank of squadron leader. After he left the service he wrote a number of books on the RAF, three of which described his own experiences as a bomber pilot. His books portray life as it was in RAF Bomber Command during the course of the Second World War. Currie served as narrator in three BBC documentaries on the air war over Europe.

== Early life ==
Currie was born in Sheffield, the son of John Alban William Currie and Margaret Ulph Ward-Smith. While he was still a young child the family moved to Harrow, London. Currie was taken to air shows, where he became fascinated with aeroplanes. After leaving school he worked a variety of jobs, including cartoonist for the Harrow Observer. On occasion his cartoons were featured on the pages of national publications such as Punch. In the evenings Currie sang for a dance band.

With the outbreak of war in 1939 Currie volunteered to serve in the Royal Air Force. He scored well on the aptitude tests and was placed on the deferred service list to await pilot training. While awaiting his call up he volunteered as a stretcher bearer and ambulance driver during the London blitz. He also served as an ARP runner.

== Second World War ==
=== Flight training ===
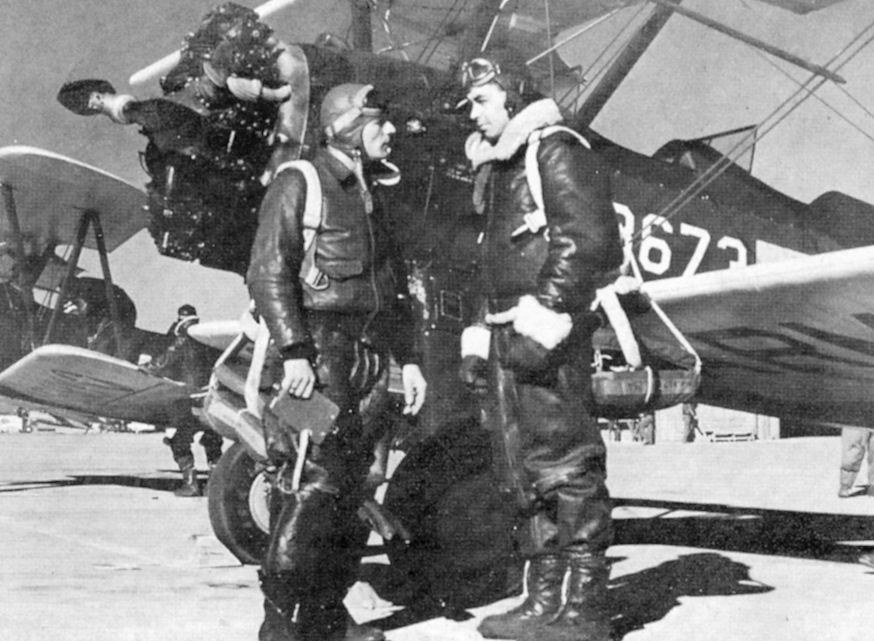
US Army Air Corps Flight instructor and cadet stand before an AT-10 trainer, Georgia 1943

In 1941 Currie was called up to serve in the RAF. He completed his initial training in England, undergoing dual instruction on Tiger Moths at RAF Ansty. He was then shipped to the state of Georgia for pilot training by the United States Army Air Corps under the Arnold Scheme.

In early 1942, he soloed at Souther Field, near Americus, Georgia. Souther was the same field where Charles Lindbergh had first soloed. After finishing his initial training at Souther, Currie moved on to Cochran Field, near Cochran, Georgia, for further training.

His penchant for low flying nearly resulted in his being failed out of primary flying school. Near the end of his Basic course he was flying low over a river when he discovered a second Stearman trainer coming up on him from behind. Thinking it rather bold for another student to attempt to gain a firing position, Currie put his airplane through a sharp, climbing turn. He discovered the other plane was flown well, and was able to regain its position. With that Currie put in a series of hard maneuvers, finally gaining the upper hand. Pulling up alongside, he waved but got no response. Shortly after returning he was called up to see the top flight instructor at the base. The other pilot had been no student, but was the base's chief flight instructor. Low level flying was an automatic wash-out offense. Learning of what had happened, Currie's instructor spoke up for him, and through his intervention Currie was able to stay on, though he was saddled with a heavy penalty in "tours" and had to forfeit leave between courses. At the completion of his training Currie was rated "above average" and offered a commission in exchange for staying on in Georgia as a pilot instructor. Wanting to return to the United Kingdom and fly operations, he declined the offer. This struck the review board as odd, so as an excuse for declining the commission he claimed he felt he was too young to be an officer. The board understood there was more to it, but declined to question him further and allowed him to return to England.

=== Forming a crew ===
Currie earned his wings and returned to the United Kingdom in late 1942, being posted to Bomber Command as a sergeant pilot. He was sent for further training at an Operational Training Unit, and received final training at a Heavy Conversion Unit, where he collected a crew. His crew was assembled in the usual RAF manner. All the trainees were placed in a large hangar and sorted themselves out on their own into crews. Currie was approached by navigator Jimmy Cassidy, and the two of them collected the rest. Currie's flight crew comprised Sergeant Pilot Jack Currie (pilot), Pilot Officer Jimmy Cassidy (navigator), Flight Sergeant Larry Myring (bomb aimer), Sergeant "Johnny" Walker (flight engineer), Sergeant Charlie Fairbairn (wireless operator), Sergeant George Protheroe (mid upper gunner) and Sergeant Charles Lanham (rear gunner). All were on their first operational tour. Lanham had already completed 9 sorties from a previous posting. He had been removed from his first crew and placed on disciplinary duty for 6 months after he punched his pilot for drinking alcohol too near to their flight time. Shortly after making Currie's acquaintance, Lanham made his feelings on the subject clear. "I don’t reckon grog mixes with flying, and I aim to survive this war." Replied Currie "So do I. And just to set your mind at ease, I only drink on leave or stand downs." "You ought to cut that out too, skipper. Grog slows your reactions." The only officer on board was the navigator, Pilot Officer Cassidy. Three of the crew, Cassidy, Myring and Lanham, were Australian. The other four were British.

=== First tour ===
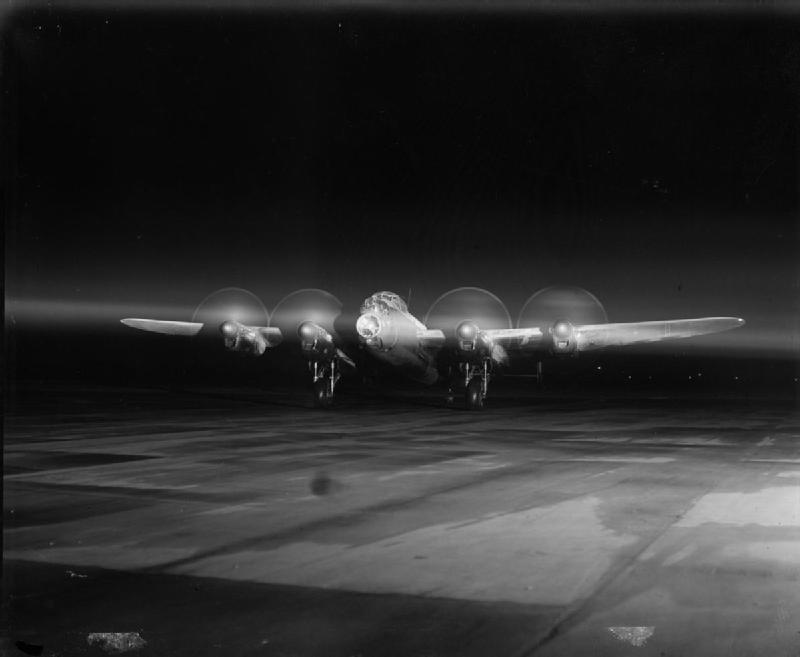
A Lancaster warms up its engines in preparation for a mission over the continent

In June 1943 Currie and his crew were posted to 12 Squadron based at RAF Wickenby. The squadron was equipped with the Avro Lancaster. Currie's crew were part of the squadron's "C" Flight. On 3 July 1943 Currie flew his first mission as second pilot to Flight Lieutenant Benjamin McLaughlin on a mission to Cologne. McLaughlin was an experienced pilot with a DFC to his credit. Three days later Currie piloted his own aircraft and crew on their first operation together, laying mines in the Bay of Biscay.

Following these two shake down flights Currie and his crew began regular operations with the rest of 12 Squadron. He was thankful for his posting. "I warmed to the thought of flying the world's best heavy bomber. We rolled into a turn together, held the turn steadily, without adjustment, with no anxious glances at the dials or searches for the dim horizon. I could scan the sky or talk to the crew, while my senses told me that the turn was accurate. How satisfying it was to fly the Lancaster." In August Currie was commissioned as a pilot officer. On their fifth mission the squadron was sent to bomb Hamburg. The flight became their most difficult sortie. Over the target they flew into a heavy storm. While evading Flak the aircraft went into a cloud, was tossed onto its back and fell into a steep dive. Currie had the sense that he had lost all control of the aircraft. Struggling with the controls he felt something give way. They lost 10,000 feet and Currie instructed the crew to prepare to bail out. Just at that moment he was able to pull out, but the Lancaster did not feel right. He soon found it was extremely difficult to turn the aircraft. In the intense winds of the storm both ailerons had been ripped from the wings of the aircraft. With the rudder he could change the direction the aircraft was pointing, but without the ailerons he could not bank to change the direction of flight. The plane would just skid sideways and return to its original heading. Thinking about the principles he learned in flight school, he realized by increasing the power to the outer engine he could use the torque of the propeller to lift the wing and bank the aircraft. He succeeded in turning the aircraft toward home, but control of pitch and yaw was very difficult to maintain. Reaching England, he doubted he could maintain adequate control of the aircraft to land safely, and advised his crew to bail out. Lanham asked "What are you going to do, Jack?" "I'm going to put her down at base, but I might make a balls of it." "You won't. This is your lucky night. I'm staying on board." The rest of the crew followed suit, and though Currie warned them again to take to the chutes, there were no takers.

With no aileron controls the wings continued to rock and dip up and down, and with no flaps the landing speed had to be high to avoid stalling. Currie found the wing's rotation could not be checked with power control, but it could be timed. He brought her in low and fast, and dropped her wheels down hard on the tarmac just as she leveled out. In debriefing the station commander commented "Not one of your better landings, Currie." "No sir. If I had known you were watching I would have tried harder." When it was learned that Currie made the landing with no aileron control or flaps the station commander could not believe it. Inspection of the Lancaster soon confirmed the astonishing fact that the ailerons had indeed been torn right off the wings during the storm. The aircraft should have crashed in Germany. The squadron commander immediately recommended Currie for a Conspicuous Gallantry Medal, but this was turned down. On completion of his first operational tour Currie was awarded the Distinguished Flying Cross for this mission, as was Cassidy and Lanham, and the Distinguished Flying Medal was awarded to Fairbairn.

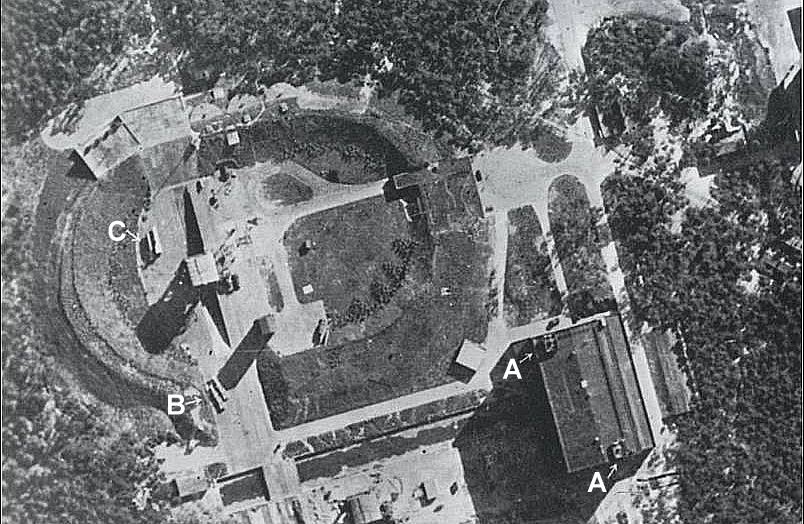
Photo-reconnaissance image of V-2 test site at Peenemünde, 23 June 1943

As the summer of 1943 unfolded Currie and his crew flew a mission to Mannheim, several missions to Milan, and then on the night of 17/18 August a trip to a secret weapons facility at the German coastal town of Peenemünde. The crews were told the site was being used by the Germans to develop a new radar guided night fighter, but the truth was the Air Ministry targeted it because they had learned the Germans were developing a new weapon there, the V-2 rocket. This may have been the most important mission Currie and his crew participated in. After bombing the target they were attacked 4 times by German night fighters, but were able to evade. The mid-upper gunner, George Protheroe, put a stream of .303 machine gun fire into one and may have shot him down. Bomber Command lost 40 aircraft on the mission, including that of the A Flight commander from 12 Squadron, but the V-2 rocket program was set back a crucial two months.

With Bomber Command expanding, on 7 November 1943 12 Squadron's "C" Flight was hived off and used to form the basis of a new squadron, No. 626 Squadron RAF. The new unit would share the field at Wickenby with 12 Squadron.

Currie's feisty Australian tail-gunner, Charlie Lanham, finished his tour slightly ahead of the rest of the crew, having completed 9 sorties before joining with Currie. As Currie's total trips approached the magic mark of 30 he began to wonder if they would in fact beat the odds and survive their first tour. Their second to last mission was against their hardest target, a target crews liked to call "The Big City." It was part of Bomber Harris' four month campaign against Berlin, a campaign that Bomber Command was in the process of losing. Currie and crew survived the trip. With its completion Currie was looking forward to a milk run in the next few days to end his tour. Instead he awoke the next morning to learn he was up for ops again that night. Worse, the target was again... Berlin. Furious that his final mission was back to one of the continent's most distant and dangerous targets, Currie went to argue with his flight commander, but he could make no odds. The CO reassured him that waiting for a few days for a final op was a mistake, and that it was all for the best. Currie and his crew set out for their final mission, and completed it without incident. Their first tour was completed in February 1944.

=== Pilot instructor ===
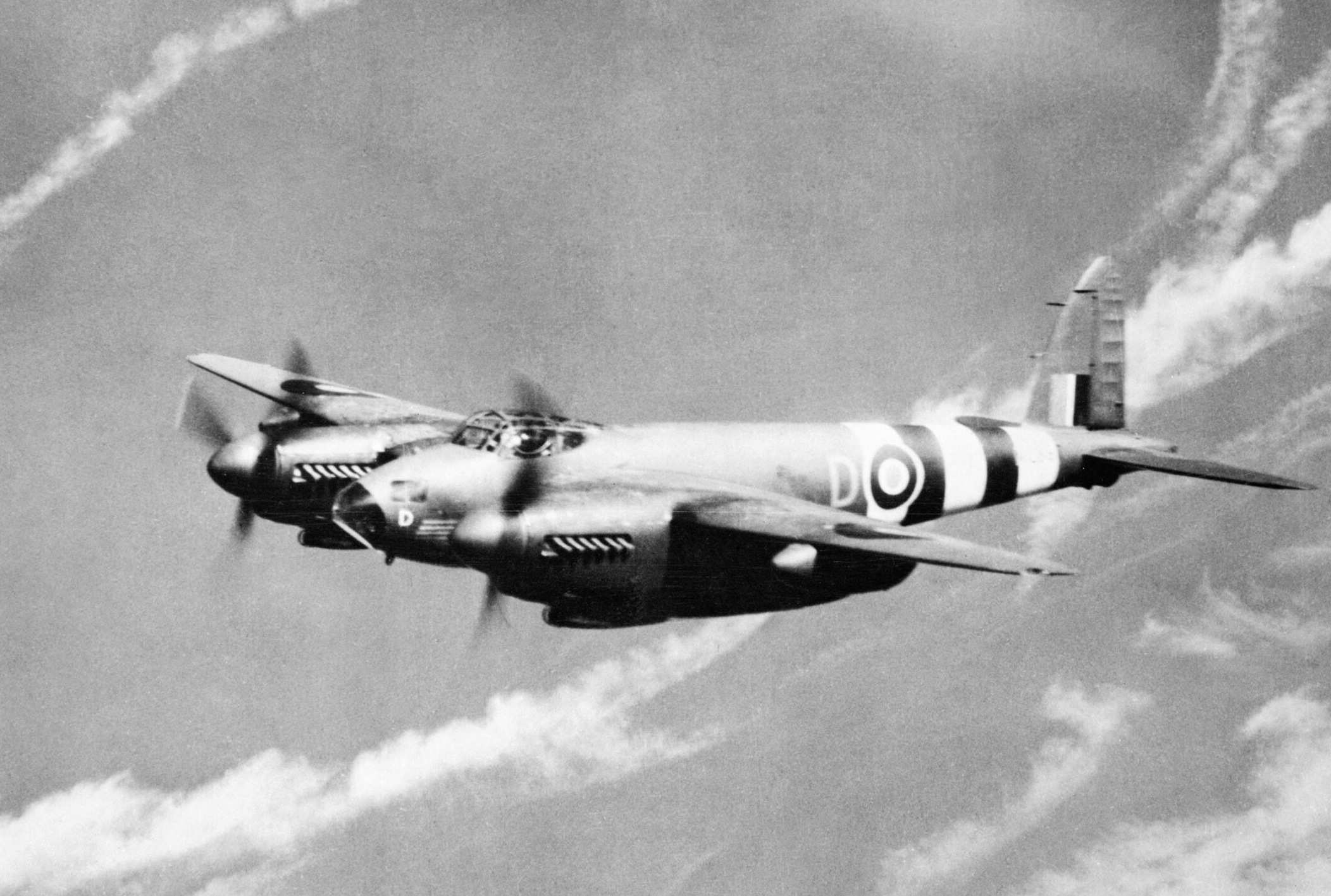
Mosquito of 1409 Meteorological Flight

After a period of leave Currie was posted to 1662 Heavy Conversion Unit based at RAF Blyton and qualified as an instructor flying the Handley Page Halifax. He spent most of his time training Polish pilots in the handling of the Halifax. Promoted to flying officer, he spent several months at Blyton before being posted to RAF Sandtoft.

=== Second tour ===
Currie was reassigned and trained to fly the Mosquito. Though no posts were coming open, a navigator who was an officer asked if he would want to apply for the Pathfinder Force. He was accepted, and assigned to their weather unit, the 1409 Meteorological Flight. Currie ended the war flying for the Pathfinders on weather prediction missions.

== After the war ==
After the war Currie applied for and received a permanent commission. In the following years he served at RAF Lindholme, RAF West Kirby, RAF Akrotiri on Cyprus, and at RAF Syerston. While posted at Syerston in 1959 he came to live in Newark. He retired from the RAF in 1964 with the rank of squadron leader.

Currie worked as Civil Defence Officer for Newark from 1964 till 1970, when the government closed down most of their Civil Defence operations. While living in Newark he became involved in the town cricket club and the Robin Hood Theatre at Averham, where he participated in a number of theatrical productions, notably playing the king in the Newark Amateur Operatic Society's 1961 production of The King and I. In 1970 he moved his family to London to take up a position as south east area secretary in organising small scale air shows. Over time these grew and developed into the RAF Benevolent Fund's annual Royal International Air Tattoo. In 1975 Currie moved to Easingwold near York to present Civil Defence lectures at the Home Defence College. He retired in 1986.

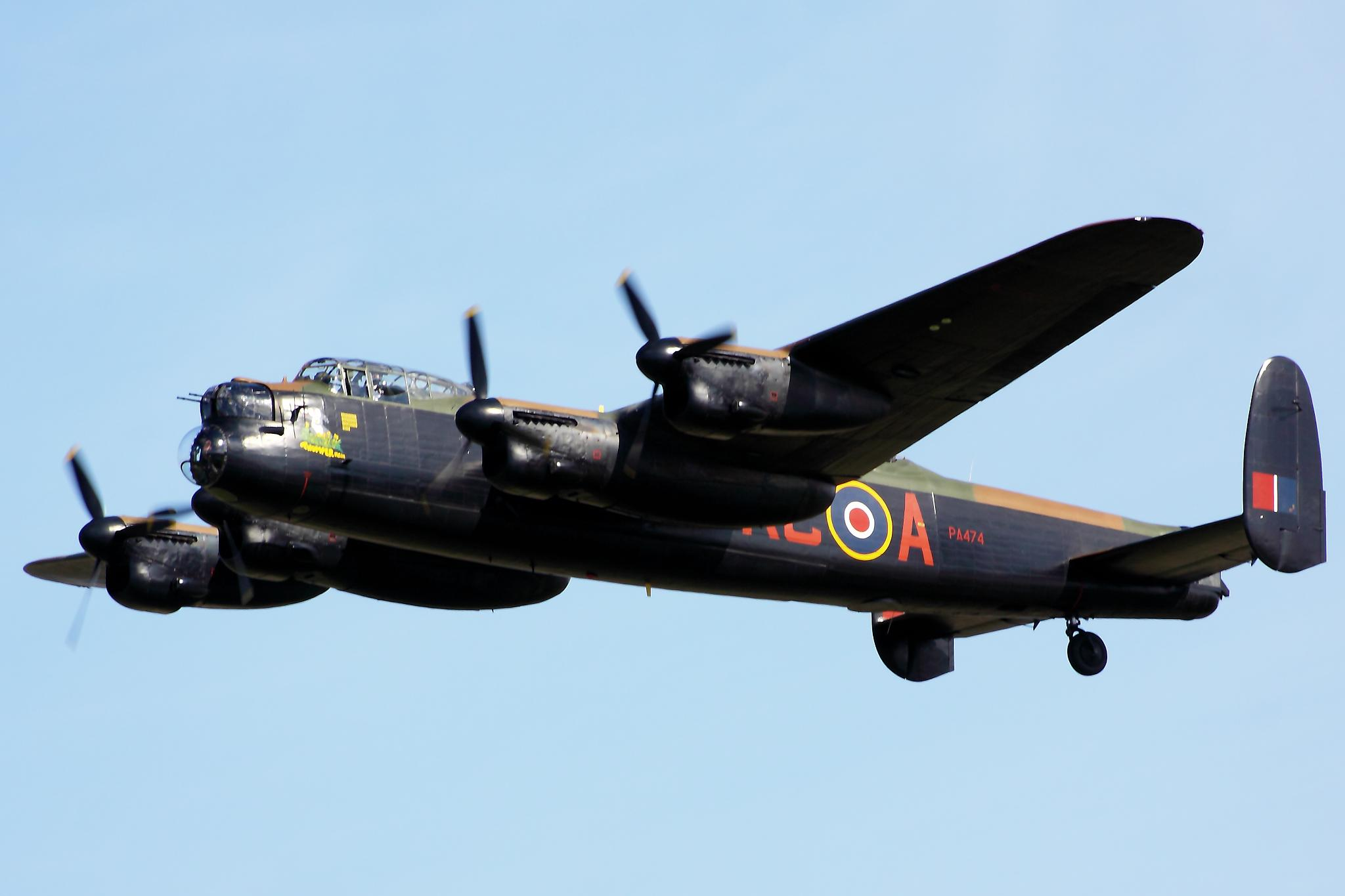
Lancaster of the Battle of Britain Memorial Flight

Throughout his life Currie held a deep admiration for the Lancaster bomber, which he flew during his first tour. In the 1970s and 1980s Currie wrote a number of books detailing the experiences of the crews who took part in the RAF's bombing campaign.

In those books that related his personal experience he provided the reader with a first hand account of just what it was like to fly from Wickenby on some of the war's most difficult raids. It was said in the press that "he wrote with a warmth and humour that belied the extreme peril he and his crew faced on a daily basis." Through his writing he was asked to participate in a number of BBC television documentaries on the Royal Air Force, which he narrated. These included The Lancaster Legend, The Augsburg Raid and The Watchtower. A highlight of his later years was when he was asked to join the RAF crew of the Battle of Britain Memorial Flight's Lancaster, and took the controls while over Lincolnshire.

== List of works ==
- Lancaster Target: the story of a crew who flew from Wickenby (1981)
- Mosquito Victory (1983)
- The Augsburg Raid (1987)
- Wings Over Georgia (1989)
- Battle Under the Moon: An Account of the RAF raid on Mailly-le-Camp (1995)
- Round the clock: experience of the allied bomber crews who flew by day and by night from England by Jack Currie and Philip Kaplan (1993)
- Echoes in the Air (1998)
