= Fritzsche =

Fritzsche is a German surname. Like Fritsch, Fritsche and Fritzsch, it is a patronymic derived from Friedrich. Notable people with the surname include:

- Carl Julius Fritzsche (1808–1871), German chemist
- Christian Friedrich Fritzsche (1776–1850), German Protestant theologian
- Franz Volkmar Fritzsche (1806–1887), German classical philologist
- Friedrich Wilhelm Fritzsche (1825–1905), German parliamentarian and newspaper editor in the United States
- Gotthard Daniel Fritzsche (1797–1863), Australian theologian
- Hans Fritzsche (1900–1953), German Nazi official
- Hellmut Fritzsche (1927–2018), German-American physicist
- Immo Fritzsche (1918–1943), German Luftwaffe officer
- Oliver Fritzsche (born 1970), German politician
- Otto Fridolin Fritzsche (1812–1896), German theologian
- Ronald Fritzsche (born 1945), American Icthyologist who described the fishes Cosmocampus heraldi,’Syngnathus macrobrachium, Syngnathus euchrous, Syngnathus insulae, Solenostomus halimeda, †Syngnathus emeritus, and Micrognathus pygmaeus.
- Walter Fritzsche (1903–1956), German footballer

== Fictional ==
- Andi Fritzsche, a character in the German soap opera Verbotene Liebe

== Places ==
- Fritzsche Army Air Field (closed 1994), a former airport on the site of Marina Municipal Airport

== See also ==
- Variations of the name:
  - Fritsch
  - Fritsche
  - Fritzsch
- Frič, Czechized variation of the name
