= Fritsch =

Fritsch is a German surname. Like Fritsche, Fritzsch and Fritzsche, it is a patronymic derived from Friedrich.

As an author citation in botany, it refers to Karl Fritsch (1864–1934).

Notable people with the surname include:

- Ahasverus Fritsch (1629–1701), German jurist, poet and hymn writer
- Antonin Fritsch (1832–1913), Czech palaeontologist
- Bayley Fritsch (born 1996), professional Australian rules footballer
- Bernard Joseph Fritsch (1881–1951), Australian rules footballer
- Brad Fritsch (born 1977), Canadian professional golfer
- Eberhard Ludwig Cäsar Fritsch (died 1974), editor and publisher of the pro-Nazi monthly magazine in Argentina Der Weg
- Edward F. Fritsch (born 1950), scientist
- Elizabeth Fritsch (born 1940), British potter
- Eloy Fernando Fritsch (born 1968), Brazilian electronic musician
- Felix Eugen Fritsch, English phycologist
- Ferdinand Fritsch (1898-1966/7), Austrian football manager
- Florian Fritsch (born 1985), German professional golfer
- Frederick William Fritsch (born 1954), American former bobsleigh athlete
- Gerhard Fritsch (1924–1969), Austrian novelist and poet
- Gunther von Fritsch (1906–1988), film director
- Gustav Fritsch (1837–1927), German physiologist
- Hans Fritsch (1911–1987), German discus thrower
- Heinrich Fritsch (1844–1915), German gynecologist and obstetrician
- Horst Fritsch (1931–2010), German Green Party politician
- Jamie Fritsch (born 1985), American former professional ice hockey defenseman
- Johannes Fritsch (1941–2010), German composer
- Karl Fritsch (1864–1934), Austrian botanist
- Karl von Fritsch (1838–1906), German geologist
- Karl Fritsch (jeweller) (born 1963), German-born contemporary jeweller
- Katharina Fritsch (born 1956), German sculptor
- Lisa Fritsch (born 1975), American author and community activist
- Ludwig Fritsch, pseudonym of Marie Luise Droop (1890–1959), German writer, director and producer
- Margaret Goodin Fritsch (1899–1993), American architect
- Michael Fritsch, academic and researcher in the field of economics
- Nicolas Fritsch (born 1978), French cyclist
- Paul Fritsch (chemist) (1859–1913), German co-inventor of the Fritsch–Buttenberg–Wiechell rearrangement
- Paul Fritsch (1901–1970), French boxer
- Rüdiger von Fritsch (born 1953), German diplomat and author
- Stephan Fritsch (1962–2014), German artist
- Theodore Edward Fritsch Jr. (born 1950), former American football center
- Theodor Fritsch (1852–1933), German publisher and antisemitic pundit
- Thomas Fritsch (1944–2021), German television and dubbing actor
- Toni Fritsch (1945–2005), Austrian player of football (soccer) and American football
- Waldemar Fritsch (1909–1978), German porcelain sculptor and ceramist
- Walter Fritsch (1911-date of death unknown), Chilean hurdler
- Werner von Fritsch (1880–1939), German Wehrmacht officer
- Willy Fritsch (1901–1973), German theater and film actor
- Wolfgang Fritsch (born 1949), German lightweight rower

== See also ==
- Frisch, a surname
- Fritsche
- Fritzsch
- Fritzsche (disambiguation)
- Frič, Czechized variation of the name
- Blomberg-Fritsch Affair
- Fritsch–Buttenberg–Wiechell rearrangement
