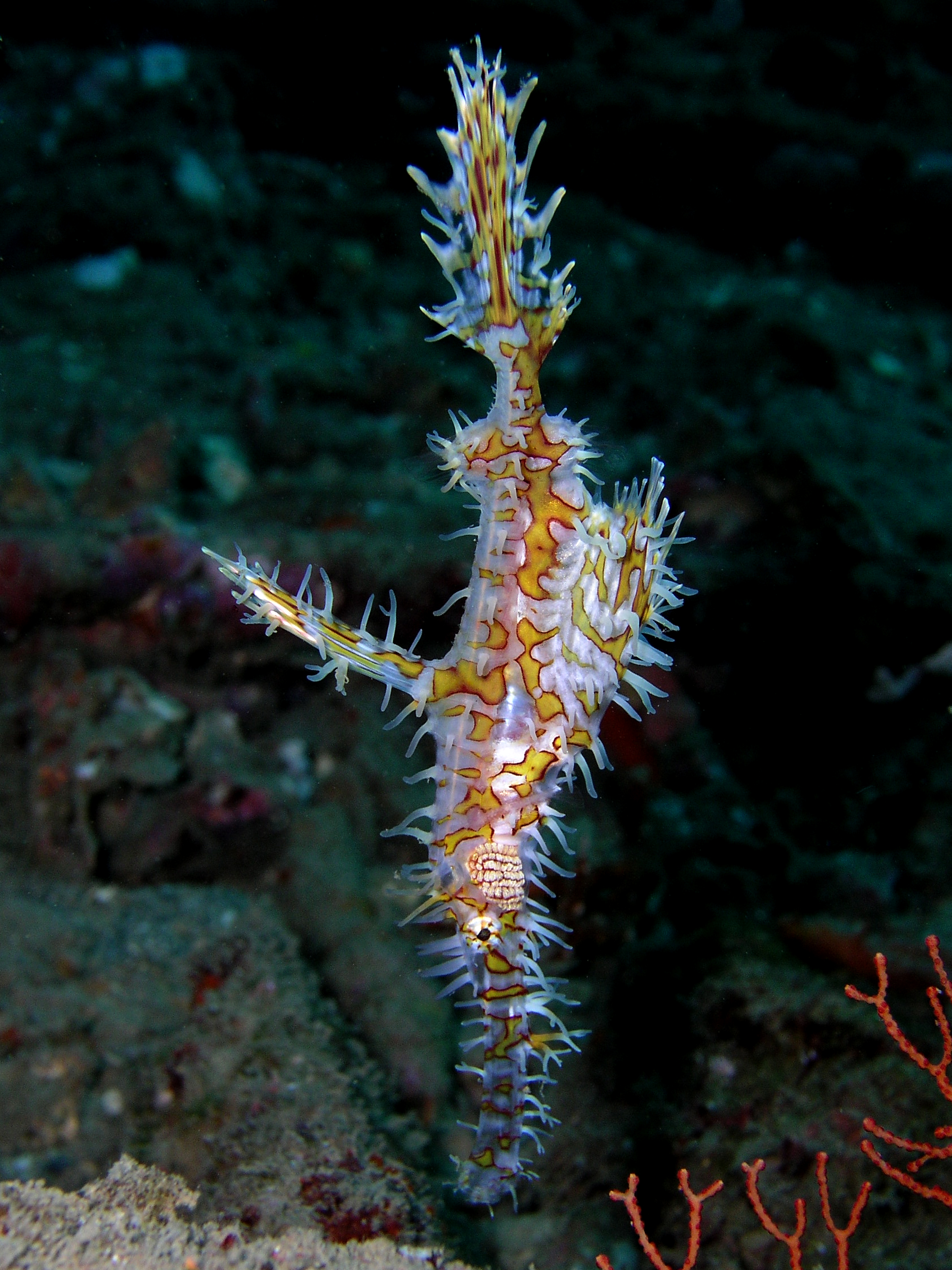

Conservation status
- Least Concern (IUCN 3.1)

Scientific classification
- Kingdom: Animalia
- Phylum: Chordata
- Class: Actinopterygii
- Division: Teleostei
- Order: Syngnathiformes
- Family: Solenostomidae
- Genus: Solenostomus
- Species: S. paradoxus

Binomial name
- Solenostomus paradoxus (Pallas, 1770)

Synonyms
- Fistularia paradoxa Pallas, 1770; Solenostomatichthys paradoxus (Pallas, 1770)

= Solenostomus paradoxus =

Species of fish

Solenostomus paradoxus, the ornate ghost pipefish or harlequin ghost pipefish, is a false pipefish of the family Solenostomidae. The species' name comes from the Greek paradoxos, referring to this fish's unusual external features. With its common name, ghost, referring to its ability to disguise itself and appear and disappear quickly. Alluding to the fact that even though it is a relatively common fish, ornate ghost pipefish are very well-camouflaged and difficult to find.

== Taxonomy ==
This species belongs to the superfamily Syngnathidae and the family Solenostomidae, which consists of only one genus which it also inhabits; Solenostomus. Given the extreme differences in coloration between species of the genus Solenostomus, it was a mystery to how many species of ghost pipefish actually exist. Currently, there are only a few recognized species under the genus: S. armatus (the long-tailed ghost pipefish), S. cyanopterus (the robust ghost pipefish), S. halimeda (the halimeda ghost pipefish), and S. paraxodus (the ornate ghost pipefish). S. paradoxus are distinguishable from other species in the order Syngnathiformes (seahorses, seadragons, and pipefishes) through their characteristic two dorsal fins. They continue to maintain distinction from other species in their order by having a more slender, elongate body than their relatives the seahorses. When observing the closer relatives in its genus, it continues to differ from its congeners through its possession of abdominal spinules, fourth and fifth plates at the bases of the dorsal and anal fins, and males who possess nasal lamellae which completely fill the nasal cavity.

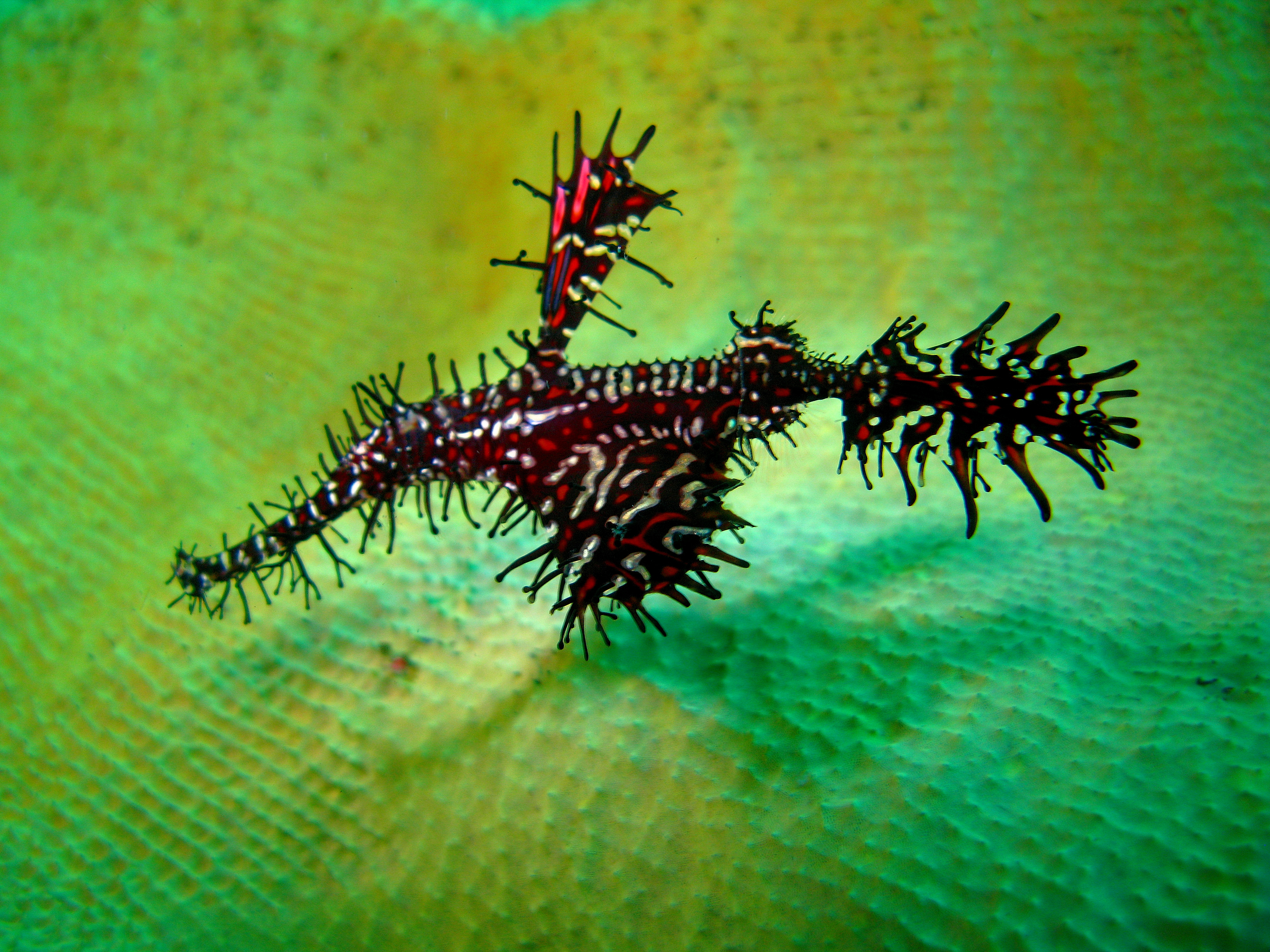
S. paradoxus at Lembeh Strait Sulawesi, 2008

== Description ==
The range of color within S. paradoxus is highly variable, and when combined with their patterned structures, it significantly aids in their ability to camouflage among their hosts. Individuals of S. paradoxus will generally stick to a color phase made up of either light or dark pigments. Individuals of light-color phases house yellow, orange, pink, white, and red pigments. Individuals of dark-color phases house pigments made up of deep browns, crimsons, yellows, and blacks. However, this seems to be a loose pattern instead of a rule. As individuals of S. paradoxus can be seen combining any number or kind of the described pigments, any may even possess pigments that are not commonly seen at all. (See "Gallery" below for color variations.)

They are characterized by their long, tubular, and downward-oriented snout and short, deep caudal peduncle. Their small mouths contain no teeth, and they do not possess a lateral line or scales. They generally maintain an upright posture and possess a prehensile tail, as well as a dermal skeleton consisting of multiple star-shaped stellate plates arranged sequentially and extending to the sides of the body. They also possess numerous small spinules on the abdominal area, dorsal fins, pelvic fins, and beyond.

There are a few distinctive differences between females and males of the species. Female S. paradoxus are substantially larger and wider than the males. On average, the females measure 130 mm in length while males are 37% smaller on average. Besides size, females can also be identified by their distinct fused brood pouch. A place where the enlarged pelvic fins of the female can fuse together with the abdomen, along the dorsal margin, to form a brood sac for the containment of their offspring.

In their earliest stages, S. paradoxus larvae can be differentiated from adults by their smaller size and possession of melanophore clusters, groups of cells that contain the dark pigment melanin and allow the S. paradoxus larvae to change color. These clusters can be found on the dorsal surface of the trunk before the gas bladder. Additionally, the young will also possess a few spines dorsolaterally on the body anterior to the anterior edge of the gas bladder.

== Distribution and maps ==
Fish of the family Solenostomidae live in tropical Indo-West Pacific waters. With S. paradoxus specifically inhabiting the waters of the Western Pacific and the Indian Ocean along reef edges prone to strong currents from the Red Sea to Tonga. There have been accounts of their presence off the coasts of many countries such as Japan, Taiwan, Micronesia, Indonesia, Australia, and in larger bodies of water like the South Pacific and South China Seas. When S. paradoxus are observed outside of their introverted lifestyles, they typically occur either as solitary individuals or in pairs.

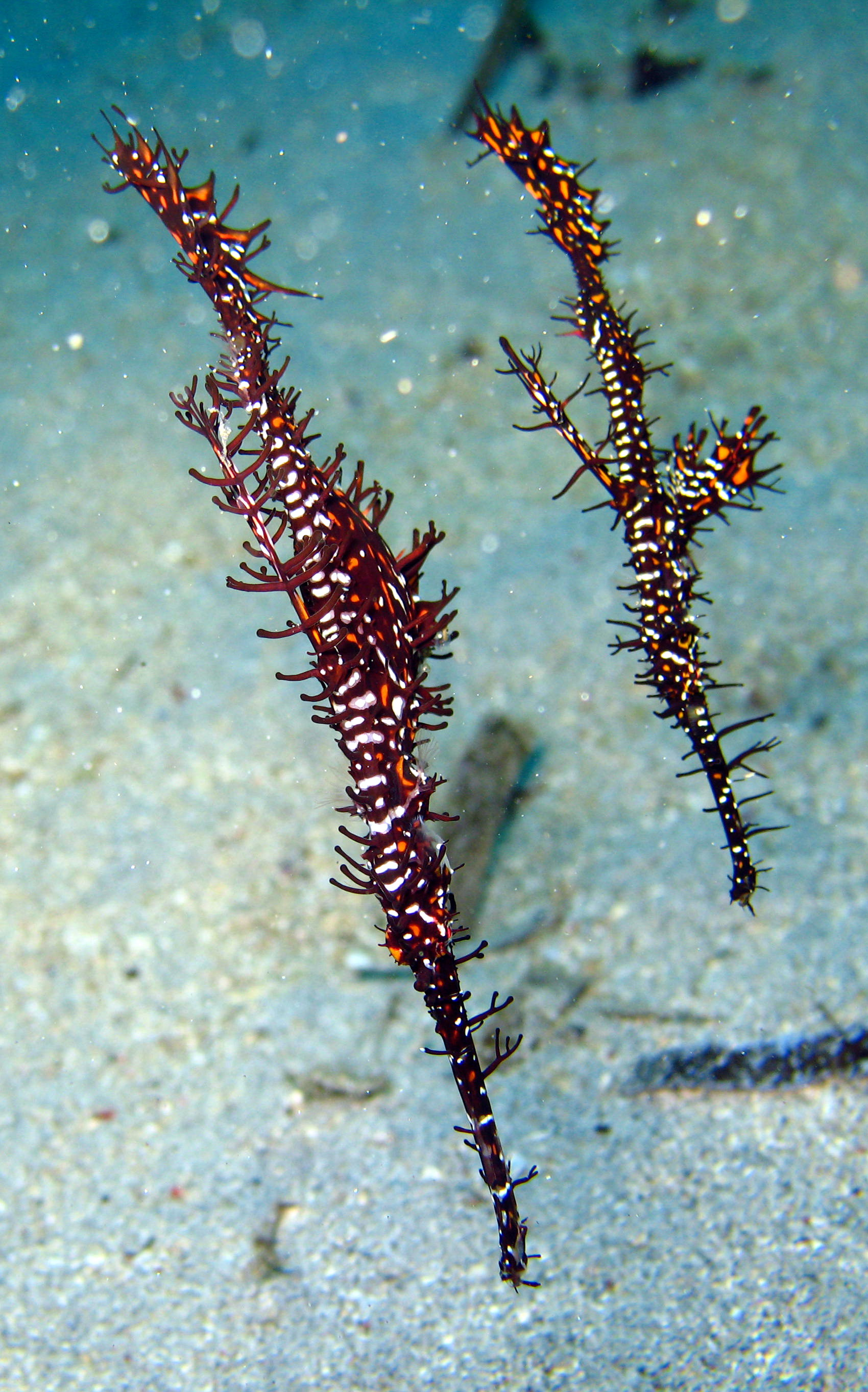
A pair observed in North Sulawesi, Indonesia

When S. paradoxus are deciding on a habitat, due to their vast differences in coloration, members of the species will search for and inhabit hosts that resemble gorgonians, corals, crinoids, hydroids, algae substrata, floating weeds, or seagrass beds that complement their coloration. This is done to utilize their distinct coloration as a kind of camouflage, allowing them to utilize a diverse array of habitats due to the sheer amount of diversity that alters the species general appearance between individuals.

Due to its elusive nature, specimens of S. paradoxus are rare. Leading to relatively few studies on the species and an even lesser idea of their general range. However, from the few specimens that have been gathered. The mysteries surrounding their range, behaviors, and preferred habitats are beginning to come to light. For example, the female S. paradoxus acquired off the coast of Mainland India was able to provide a litany of knowledge from its acquisition at a depth of 40 metres (130 ft) in the Arabian Sea. Additionally, we can also infer the range of S. paradoxus by looking at the more described range of its congeners who occupy similar niches and prefer similar habitats. Like the specimen of an S. cyanopterus that was acquired as far east as the East Korean Sea, retrieved from a depth of 23 metres (80 ft) and providing more insight on the possible range of the ornate ghost pipefish.

== Biology, behavior, and life history ==
Individuals of S. paradoxus exhibit a mostly solitary lifestyle, and when spotted in locomotion, usually do so either individually or in very small groups. When feeding, they primarily hang upside down and suction small fish and crustaceans, particularly mysid shrimps (of order Mysida) and other small benthic shrimp, through a specialized snout. Given their camouflage, they are often mistaken as drifting pieces of algae or dead plant matter. Allowing them a measure of safety against possible predators and allowing them to sit idly by and ambush unsuspecting prey that pass by their hiding spots.

The family of S. paradoxus, Solenostomidae, is a group of skin-brooding fishes. Skin-brooding, in their superfamily Syngnathidae, involves the male brooding the eggs on their skin. But unlike their relatives, Solenostomus embryos develop on the female. The female brood sac allows them to lay eggs inside of the pouch that males can then fertilize. It is estimated that the normal brood size of the average S. paradoxus female may reach as high as 350 embryos. The embryos of S. paradoxus are enclosed within egg envelopes and are attached to epidermal stalks, termed cotylephores, which only occur in brooding females. Cotylephores are cellular outgrowths of the epithelium on the interior surface of the pelvic fins, which further develop multi-headed cylindrical branches where each branch, termed an apical calyx, can connect to an egg envelope. The rest of the adjacent calyces on the same cotylephore will then establish connections with the primary egg envelope.

The embryos of S. paradoxus will then develop within the fused pelvic fins of the female until they are mature enough to leave. Small S. paradoxus larvae, smaller than 3.9 mm in total body length, are not likely to be present outside of a female's brood pouch. But once outside, the offspring of ghost pipefishes are planktonic and will float on water currents until they can find a reef to settle on. It is currently unclear how long the larval stage lasts, and additionally. The lifespan of this species remains unknown.

== Cultural and economic value ==
The ornate ghost pipefish is an extremely popular fish among photographers due to its unique and beautiful appearance. During a scientific report of the critical habitats of NSW and their selected threatened marine species, researchers noted that many dive shops they visited sported the images of S. paradoxus on postcards and brochures. In fact, they noted that many threatened species in northern NSW are of disproportionate public interest. For example, in the northern NSW photo exhibition, Solitary Secrets. 4 out of the 15 entries were of threatened marine species. This discovery comments on the fact that rare and elusive species are often seen as iconic and intriguing. This perception then gives their image a great cultural service due to the fascination they attract, and a great economic service as their image can be used to sell merchandise of their likeness.

== Conservation status ==
The IUCN conservation status of Solenostomus paradoxus has been evaluated as "Least Concern". But despite this classification, there are several factors that could threaten to push this species, and others like it, to more threatened classifications. Primarily, the largest danger facing S. paradoxus is the loss of their extremely fragile habitat. When concerning the coral species they use as hosts, like large gorgonian corals or black coral trees. These host species are more prone to harm thanks to the damage inflicted by inexperienced divers and the ever-rising threat of anthropogenic, man-made, CO_{2} and the associated coral bleaching it causes through climate change. Additional damage could also possibly arise from bottom trawling operations, ship anchors, and many more general anthropogenic causes like pollution.

To prevent further endangerment to the species, it is incentivized that divers are educated in underwater practices to avoid harming marine organisms, that destructive practices like bottom trawling be limited, that sites housing important benthic species be marked to prohibit anchoring in their area, and that we a society move towards more definitive actions in combating climate change. Further studies on this fish are incentivized, but inhibited by its cryptic camouflage, small size, and solitary and seasonal behaviors. This is further worsened by the fact that smaller species of fish tend to be overshadowed in research by larger or more commercially significant species. Further research is important as this delicate species could function as an indicator species for the health of their reef ecosystems. They are easily affected by changing environmental conditions, and through monitoring and study. Could function as a warning to local increases in pollution or radiation. Meaning a drop in their population could indicate a worsening habitat quality.

== Gallery ==
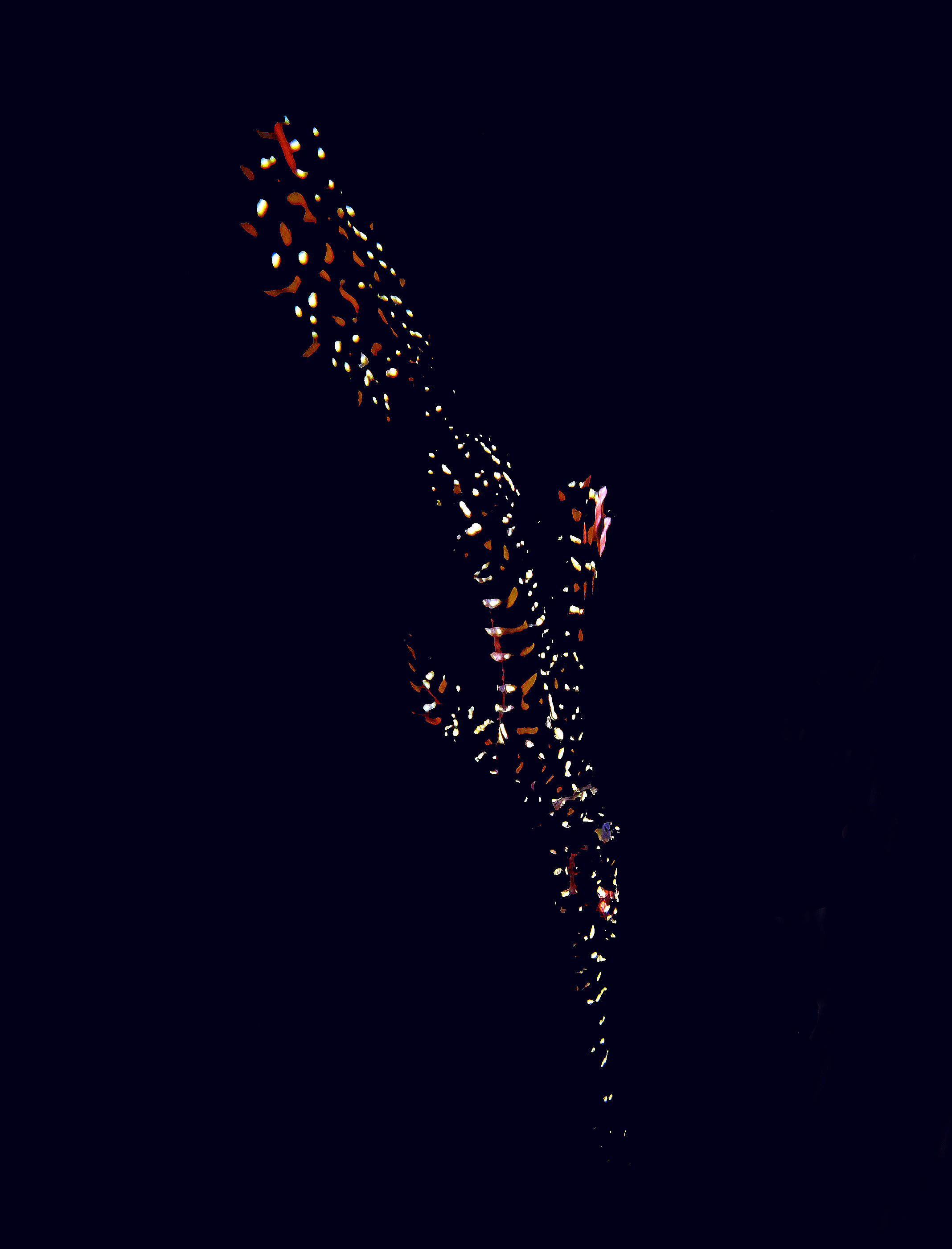
Its ghostly appearance at Lembeh Strait Sulawesi, 2007

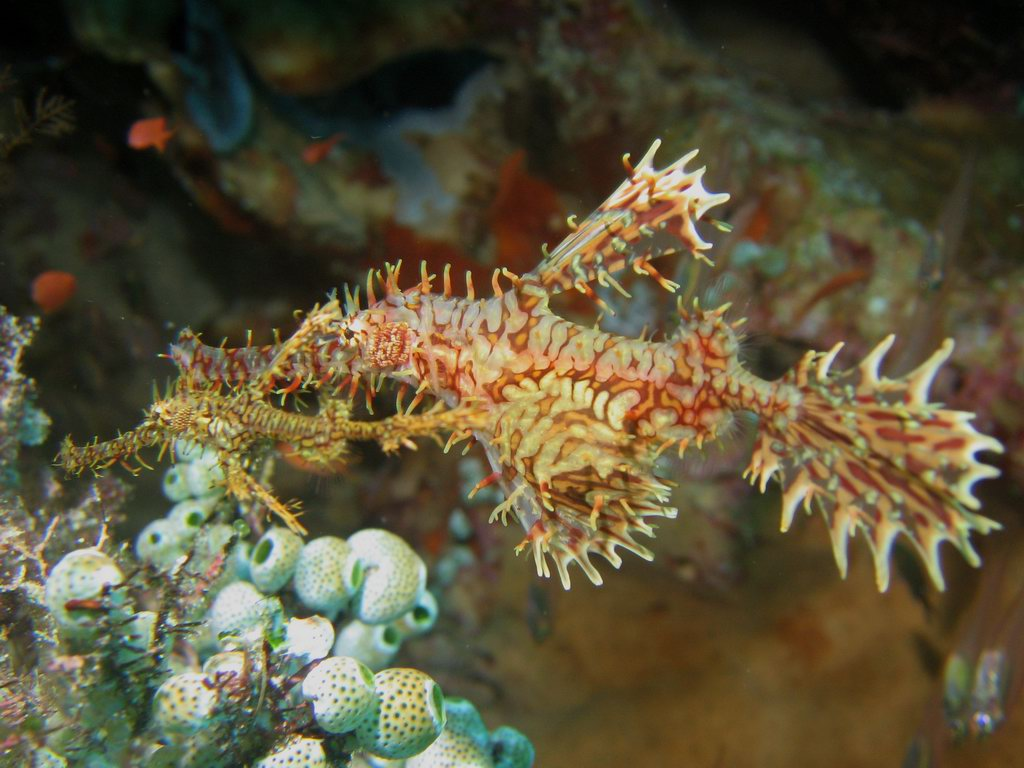
Different color variation, 2005

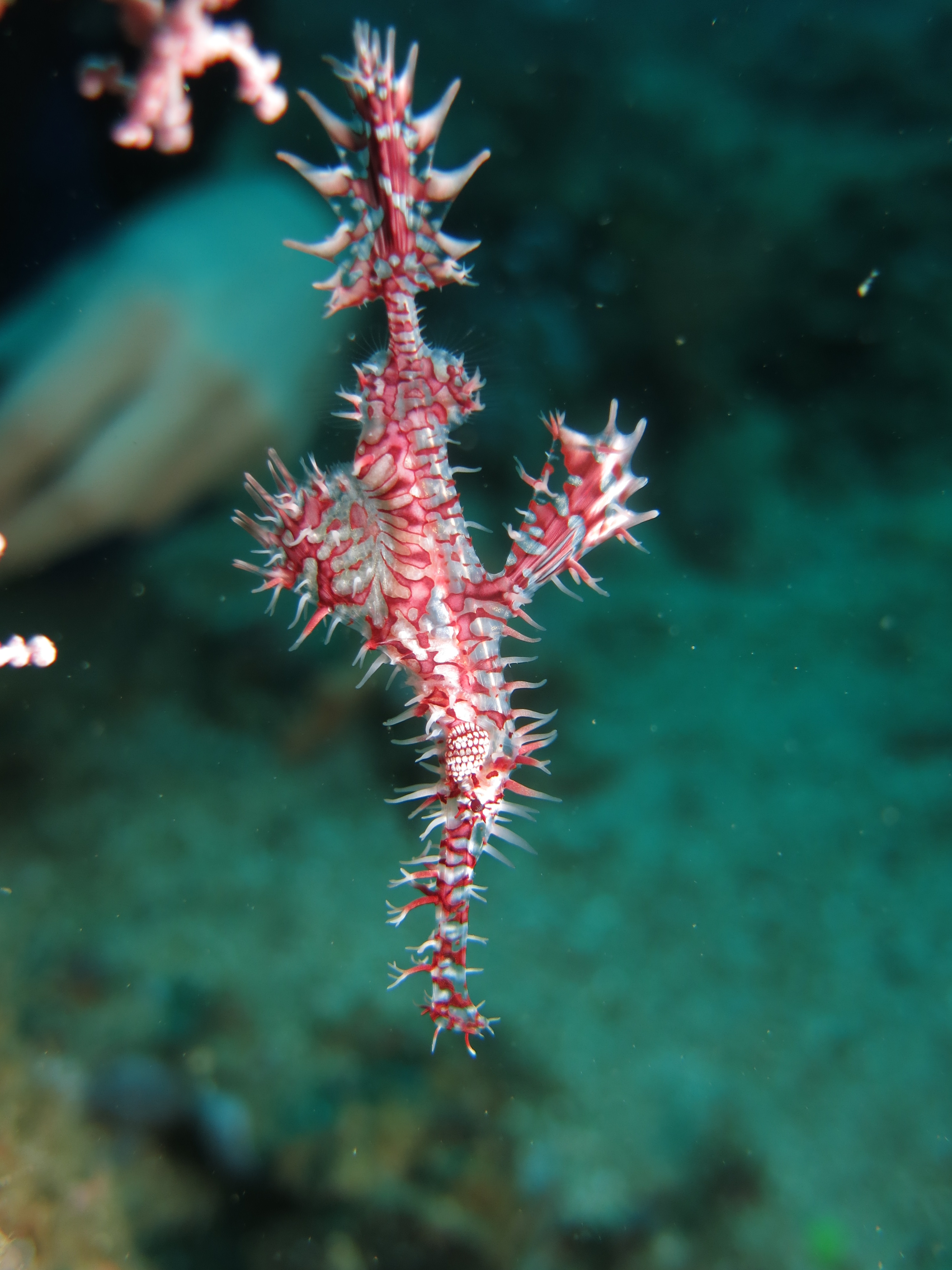
Pink S. Paradoxus at Lembeh Strait Sulawesi, 2014

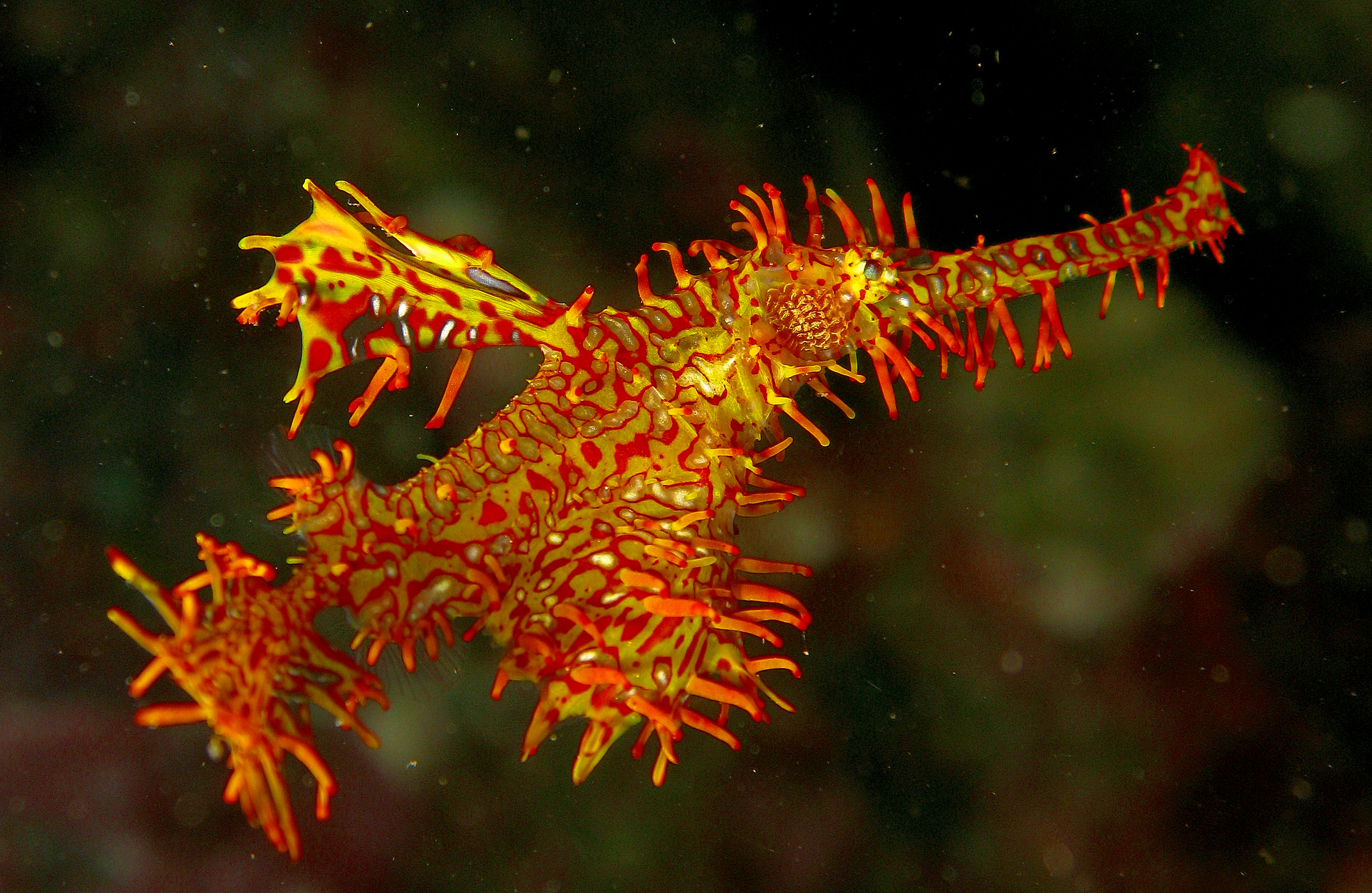
Yellow-red S. Paradoxus at Lembeh Strait Sulawesi, 2008

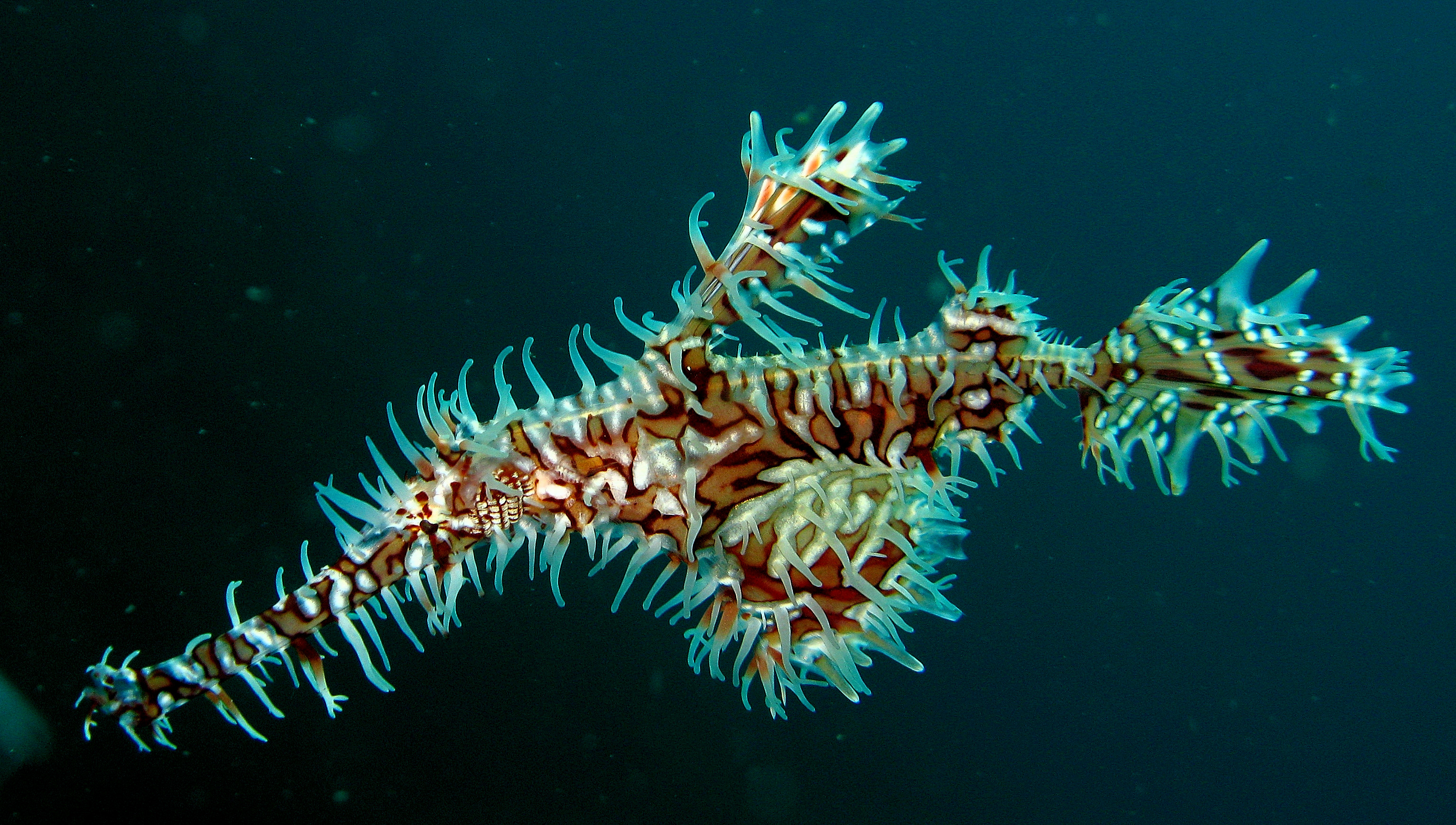
Brown pattern S. Paradoxus at Lembeh Strait Sulawesi, 2009

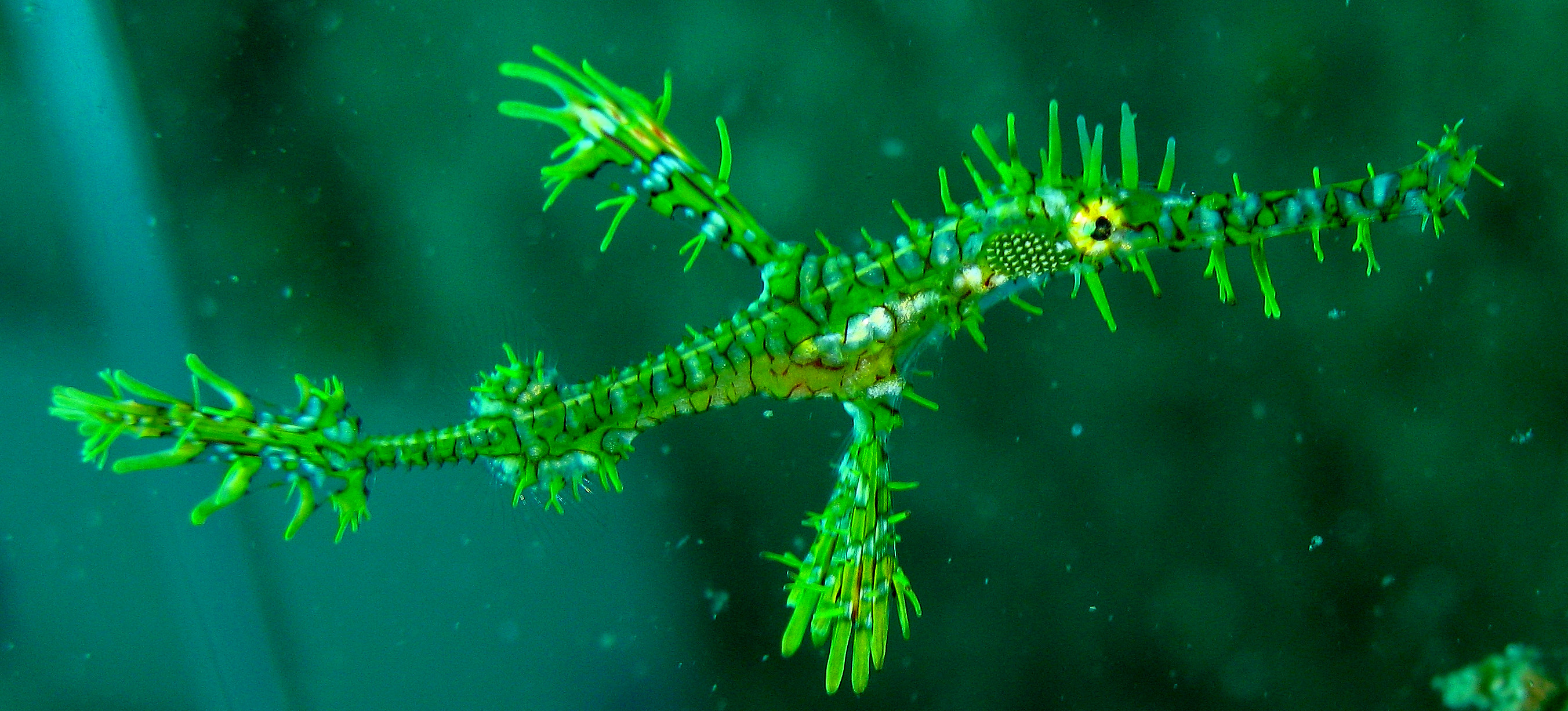
Green S. Paradoxus, 2008

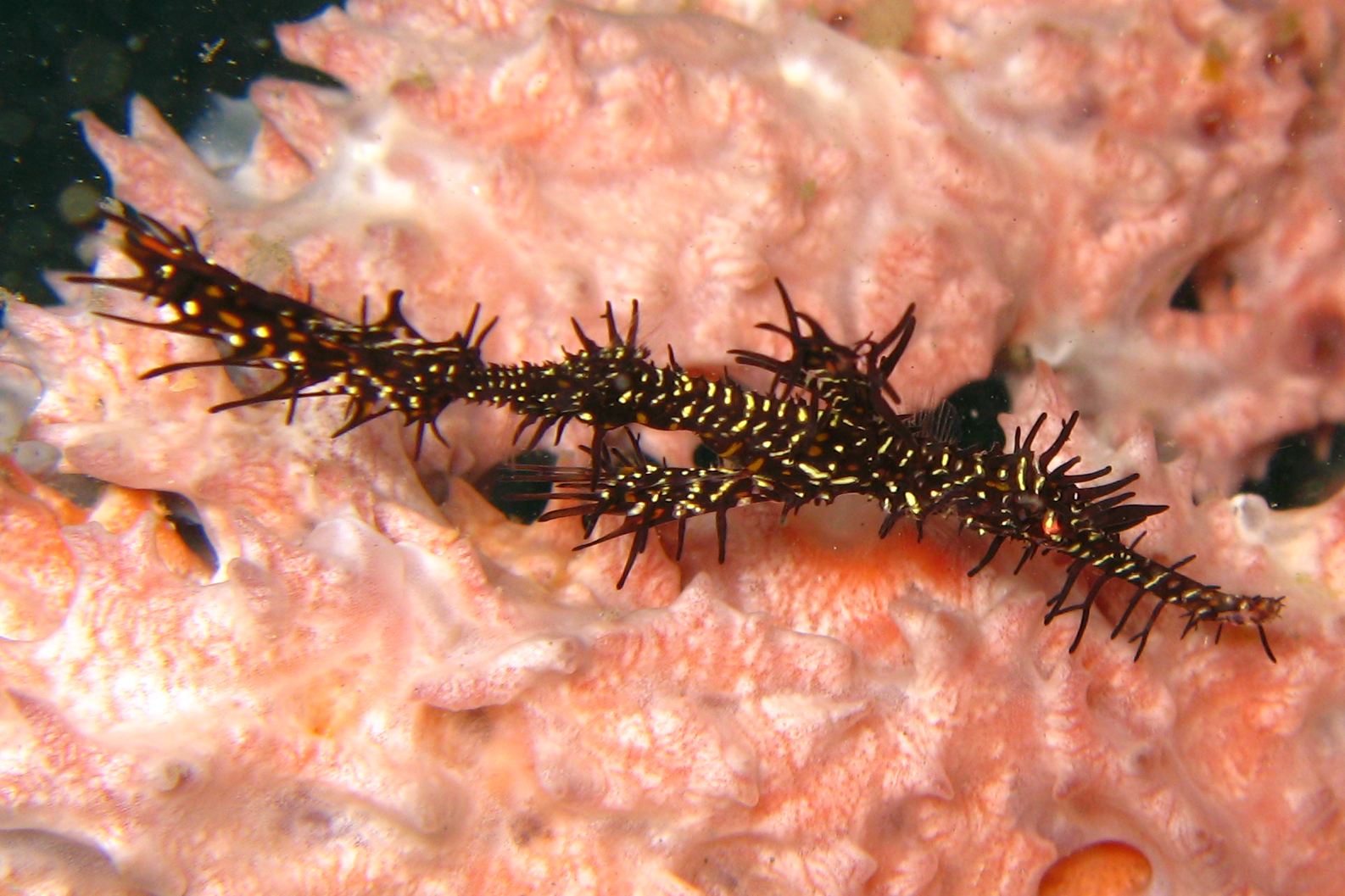
