= Fritsche =

Fritsche is a German surname. Like Fritsch, Fritzsch and Fritzsche, it is a patronymic derived from Friedrich. Notable people with the surname include:

- Claudia Fritsche (born 1952), Liechtenstein diplomat
- Dan Fritsche (born 1985), American ice hockey player
- Hans Fritsche (officer) (1909–1993), German Wehrmacht officer
- Helmut Fritsche (1932–2008), German agronomist and politician
- John Fritsche Jr. (born 1991), American ice hockey player
- John Fritsche Sr. (born 1966), American ice hockey player

== See also ==
- Frič, Czechized variation of the name
