= John Fritsche =

John Fritsche may refer to:

- John Fritsche Jr. (born 1991), American ice hockey player
- John Fritsche Sr. (born 1966), American ice hockey player

== See also ==
- Fritsche (surname)
