= Dan Fritsche =

Swiss-American ice hockey player (born 1985)

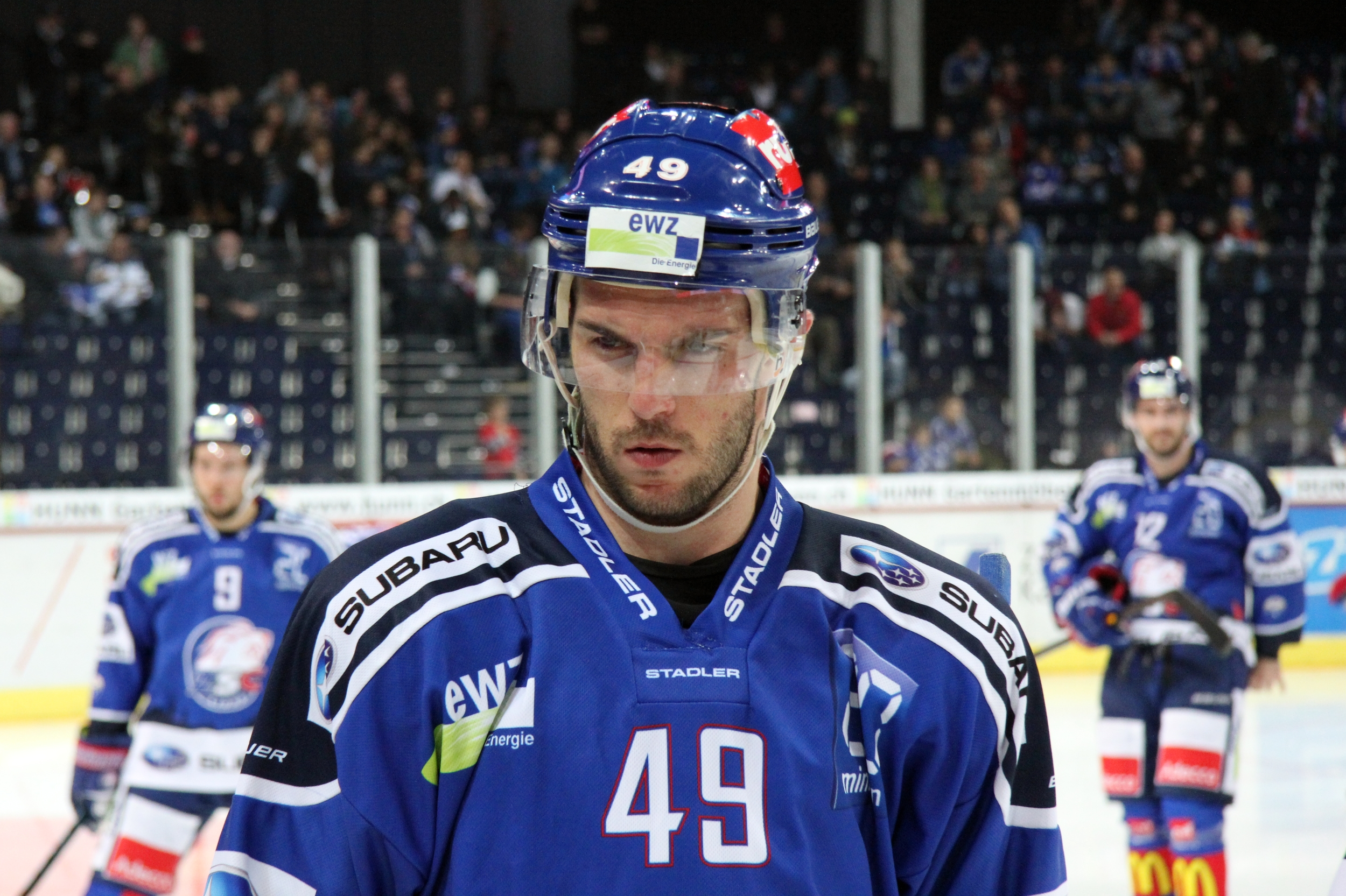
- Born: July 13, 1985 (age 41) Parma, Ohio, U.S.
- Height: 6 ft 1 in (185 cm)
- Weight: 198 lb (90 kg; 14 st 2 lb)
- Position: Centre
- Shot: Right
- Played for: Columbus Blue Jackets; New York Rangers; Minnesota Wild; Genève-Servette HC; HC Lugano; ZSC Lions
- National team: Switzerland
- NHL draft: 46th overall, 2003; Columbus Blue Jackets
- Playing career: 2003–2015

Daniel J. Fritsche (born July 13, 1985) is a Swiss-American former professional ice hockey forward. He played for Genève-Servette HC, HC Lugano and the ZSC Lions in the National League (NL) and in the National Hockey League (NHL) for the Columbus Blue Jackets, the New York Rangers and the Minnesota Wild.

== Playing career ==
Fritsche began his junior hockey career with his hometown Cleveland Barons of the North American Hockey League. He then played for the Sarnia Sting and the London Knights, and won a gold medal at the 2004 World Junior Hockey Championship, playing for the United States. He won a Memorial Cup playing for the Knights in 2005. He also played youth hockey for the Parma Flyers and is one of three players to go into the NHL from there. The other two players are Brian Holzinger and Michael Rupp.

Fritsche was ranked in the top ten in nearly every pre-draft report, but shoulder concerns scared teams away. He was drafted in the second round of the 2003 NHL entry draft, 46th overall, by the Columbus Blue Jackets. After playing for parts of four seasons with the Blue Jackets, Fritsche was traded along with Nikolai Zherdev to the New York Rangers on July 2, 2008, for defensemen Fedor Tyutin and Christian Bäckman.

On January 29, 2009, Fritsche was traded by the Rangers to the Minnesota Wild for defenseman Erik Reitz. After finishing the season with the Wild, Fritsche was not tendered a qualifying offer and became an unrestricted free agent on July 1, 2009.

On September 3, 2009, Fritsche was invited to the Atlanta Thrashers training camp for the 2009–10 season, but was not offered a contract. On October 5, 2009, he returned to the Blue Jackets organization by signing a contract with the AHL's Syracuse Crunch.

In 2010, Fritsche began playing in Switzerland's National League A for Geneve-Servette HC (GSHC).

In January 2013, he signed a three-year contract with the HC Lugano that extended him with the team through 2016. However, on November 29, 2013, Fritsche was traded to ZSC Lions, who were coached by Marc Crawford. Zurich won the 2013–14 NLA championship and Fritsche played a pivotal role in scoring four point in four games during the finals.

== National team ==
Fritsche won gold with the US national team at the 2004 World Junior Ice Hockey Championships and also represented the country at the 2005 WJC. He made his debut on the Swiss Men's National Team in December 2014. According to IIHF rules, he had to play four years in Switzerland before being eligible to represent Switzerland.

== Personal life ==
His great-grandparents emigrated from Appenzell, Switzerland, to the United States.

His younger brother, Tom Fritsche, was a prospect in the Colorado Avalanche system. He was drafted 47th overall, in the 2005 NHL entry draft. His career was cut short due to concussion. His cousin, John, plays for Fribourg-Gottéron. His uncle, John Fritsche Sr., was a longtime player in Switzerland for HC Ambri-Piotta, HC Lugano and EV Zug, played for the United States at the 1990 World Hockey Championship, and coached the Ohio Junior Blue Jackets.

== Career statistics ==
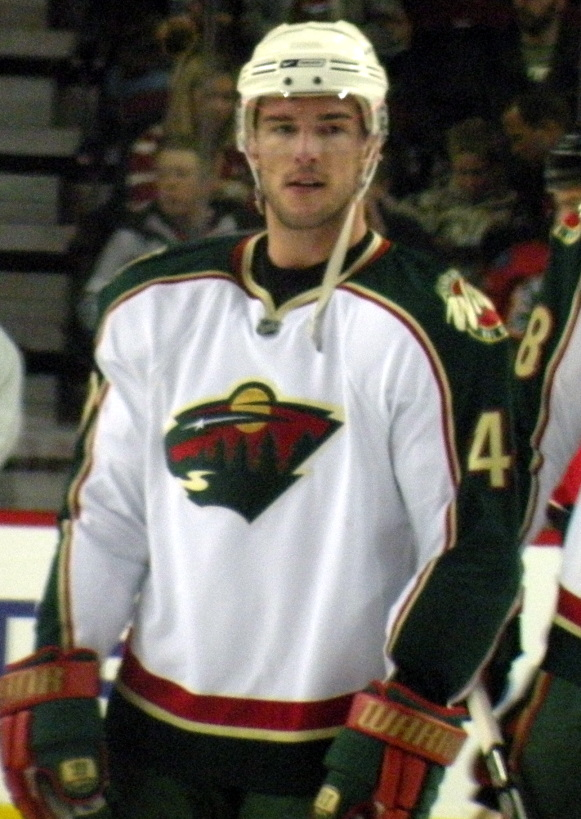
Fritsche with the Minnesota Wild in 2009.

=== Regular season and playoffs ===
			Regular season					Playoffs
Season	Team	League	GP	G	A	Pts	PIM	GP	G	A	Pts	PIM
2000–01	Cleveland Jr. Barons	NAHL	49	23	29	52	47	1	1	1	2	0
2001–02	Sarnia Sting	OHL	17	5	13	18	20	—	—	—	—	—
2002–03	Sarnia Sting	OHL	61	32	39	71	79	5	2	2	4	4
2003–04	Sarnia Sting	OHL	27	16	13	29	26	5	1	5	6	0
2003–04	Columbus Blue Jackets	NHL	19	1	0	1	12	—	—	—	—	—
2003–04	Syracuse Crunch	AHL	4	2	0	2	0	4	0	1	1	4
2004–05	Sarnia Sting	OHL	2	1	1	2	0	—	—	—	—	—
2004–05	London Knights	OHL	28	17	18	35	18	17	9	13	22	12
2005–06	Columbus Blue Jackets	NHL	59	6	7	13	22	—	—	—	—	—
2005–06	Syracuse Crunch	AHL	19	5	4	9	12	6	2	2	4	8
2006–07	Columbus Blue Jackets	NHL	59	12	15	27	35	—	—	—	—	—
2007–08	Columbus Blue Jackets	NHL	69	10	12	22	22	—	—	—	—	—
2008–09	New York Rangers	NHL	16	1	3	4	2	—	—	—	—	—
2008–09	Minnesota Wild	NHL	34	4	5	9	10	—	—	—	—	—
2009–10	Syracuse Crunch	AHL	67	13	29	42	12	—	—	—	—	—
2010–11	Genève–Servette HC	NLA	39	15	18	33	66	—	—	—	—	—
2011–12	Genève–Servette HC	NLA	14	1	1	2	6	—	—	—	—	—
2012–13	Genève–Servette HC	NLA	43	16	16	32	18	7	2	3	5	2
2013–14	HC Lugano	NLA	12	1	3	4	4	—	—	—	—	—
2013–14	ZSC Lions	NLA	22	6	7	13	6	18	2	3	5	10
2014–15	ZSC Lions	NLA	46	9	11	20	10	3	0	0	0	0
NHL totals			256	34	42	76	103	—	—	—	—	—
NLA totals			176	48	56	104	110	28	4	6	10	12

=== International ===
Year	Team	Event	Result	GP	G	A	Pts	PIM
2004	United States	WJC	1st place, gold medalist(s)	6	2	2	4	4
2005	United States	WJC	4th	7	3	4	7	22
Junior totals				13	5	6	11	26
