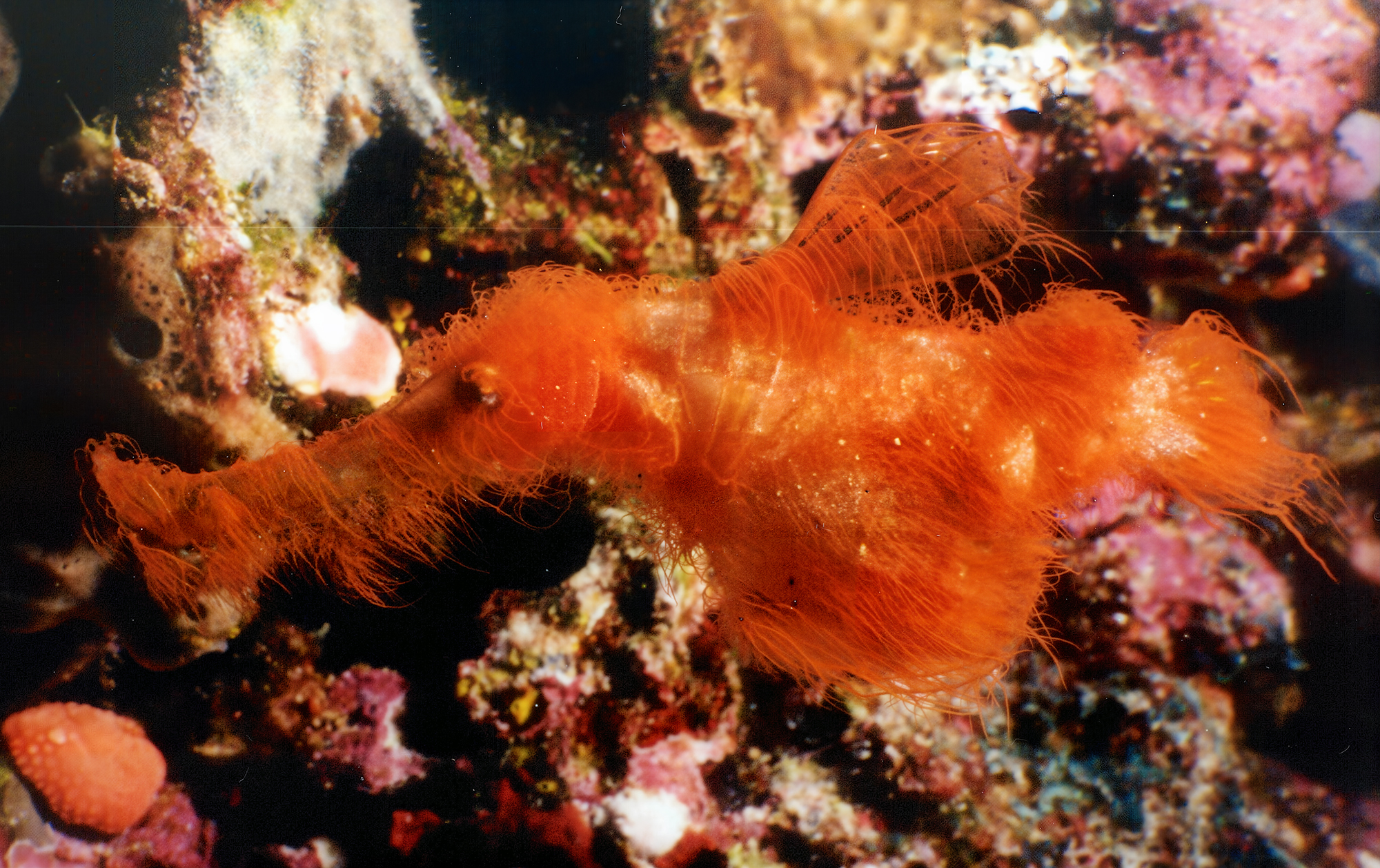
- Solenostomus snuffleupagus Tufi, Papua New Guinea, 2003.

Scientific classification
- Kingdom: Animalia
- Phylum: Chordata
- Class: Actinopterygii
- Division: Teleostei
- Order: Syngnathiformes
- Family: Solenostomidae
- Genus: Solenostomus
- Species: S. snuffleupagus

Binomial name
- Solenostomus snuffleupagus Short & Harasti, 2026

= Solenostomus snuffleupagus =

Species of ghost pipefish

Solenostomus snuffleupagus, also known as the hairy ghost pipefish, is a species of ghost pipefish belonging to the family Solenostomidae, formally described in 2026 by Graham Short and David Harasti based on specimens collected from coral reef habitats in Queensland, Australia. The species is distinguished by its shaggy appearance and by its compact, vertically deep body form.

== Etymology ==
The specific epithet snuffleupagus honours the character Mr. Snuffleupagus from the children's television series Sesame Street, in allusion to the species' shaggy appearance and snout reminiscent of the character. The name is treated as a noun in apposition. Its use was supported by Sesame Workshop, the producers of Sesame Street, whose senior vice president of global education described the naming as connecting science with imagination and discovery.

== Discovery ==
Solenostomus snuffleupagus belongs to the family Solenostomidae, a small group of syngnathiform fishes phylogenetically sister to Syngnathidae, which includes seahorses, pipefishes and sea dragons (Phycodurus and Phyllopteryx).

The earliest recognised specimens were collected during the Far North Queensland expedition in January 1993, aboard the MV NJoy, in remote waters north of Raine Island on the outer Great Barrier Reef. The expedition was led by Tom Trnski. It involved eleven researchers from the Australian Museum (S. Keable, J. Leis, M. McGrouther, S. Reader, and T. Trnski), the Museum and Art Gallery of the Northern Territory (H. Larson), and the Field Museum, Chicago (M. Hale and M. Westneat). Sally Reader and Mark Westneat collected the specimens that would eventually become the type series of the new species. Helen Larson, recognising that the material did not match any described species, noted it as new. The specimens entered the collections of the Australian Museum and the Museum and Art Gallery of the Northern Territory, where they were maintained for over three decades, available for study with techniques that did not yet exist at the time of collection.

The species was independently encountered in the field in the early 2000s, when David Harasti photographed a shaggy pipefish on a reef wall in Papua New Guinea and could not match it to anything in the scientific literature. He returned to Papua New Guinea six times and travelled to the Solomon Islands in search of another specimen, without success. Amanda Hay, Collection Manager at the Australian Museum, allowed Harasti's field observations and the stored museum material to be brought together into a single study.

Mitochondrial COI sequences indicate an uncorrected p-distance of 22.0% from the superficially similar Solenostomus paegnius, a species with which it had long been confused in museum collections and citizen science databases. Maximum likelihood phylogenetic analysis recovered S. snuffleupagus as the sister to all remaining congeners. Applying a mitochondrial DNA clock rate of approximately 1.2% sequence divergence per million years, divergence from S. paegnius is estimated to have occurred approximately 18.3 million years ago, during the early Miocene.

== Description ==
Solenostomus snuffleupagus is a small ghost pipefish, with type specimens measuring 21.3–33.6 mm standard length (SL). The body is compressed laterally, compact, and vertically deep anteriorly, tapering posteriorly to a short caudal peduncle. This compact, deep-bodied form distinguishes it from the more slender profile of all other ghost pipefishes. The most distinctive feature is the abundance of shaggy filaments. These filaments are especially dense on the snout, jaws, head, and fin extremities, while the central body is comparatively less shaggy.

Solenostomus snuffleupagus is further distinguished from all congeners by the following combination of characters:

- 36 total vertebrae (vs. 32–34 in all congeners)
- Compact body form with a short, deep pretrunk (11–14% SL), with pretrunk depth 24.4–29.2% SL (vs. 14.6–17.8% SL in S. paegnius; no overlap)
- Sexually dimorphic supraoccipital crests: moderately elevated in females, strongly developed in males (reversed relative to S. paegnius, in which the crest is more strongly developed in females)
- Two modified anchor-like ossicles spanning the pterygiophores in both the soft dorsal and anal fins (vs. three in S. paegnius)
- Absence of a ventral ossicle series between the pretrunk and soft fins (present in S. paegnius)
- Pretrunk ossicles narrow and elongated, separated by deep angular interspaces, forming a distinctive compact lattice

Micro-CT imaging, conducted at the Australian Museum by Kerryn Parkinson using a Nikon X-Tek XT H 225 micro-CT scanner, revealed the distinctive pretrunk ossicle configuration and enabled detailed assessment of the skull crest, epiotic processes, and fin supports without damaging the fragile type specimens. Fin ray counts are: soft dorsal fin 19–20 rays; soft anal fin 18–19 rays; pectoral fin 27 rays; caudal fin 15 rays.

In life, S. snuffleupagus exhibits orange to red body coloration, closely matching the red macroalgae in its environment. Adults typically display bright orange or red coloration, while smaller individuals, presumed to be juveniles, exhibit deeper red to purplish tones. The first dorsal fin, pectoral fins, and caudal fin consistently bear three oblong patches of variable colour (orange, white, or purple), which may represent a diagnostic pattern within the genus. Intraspecific colour variation occurs across the species' range: a single green individual has been documented from the Great Barrier Reef, and some individuals from Papua New Guinea exhibit purple coloration, likely reflecting phenotypic plasticity enabling matching of dominant benthic algal communities in different microhabitats.

In preservative (70% ethanol), the head and body are pale yellow-tan and lack distinct pigmentation. The filaments persist but are flattened and reduced compared to the living state.

== Distribution and habitat ==
Solenostomus snuffleupagus is known from coral reef habitats across the southwest Pacific. The type locality is Portlock Reef, on the eastern side of Eastern Reef in the southern group of the Coral Sea, Queensland, Australia. It is also confirmed to live in the Great Barrier Reef off Cairns and Townsville (Queensland), Papua New Guinea, New Caledonia, Fiji, and Tonga.

The species lives in lower sections of coral reef bommies and rubble zones supporting red macroalgae. Specimens are typically observed hovering close to the substrate among algal filaments and undulating to mimic the algae. Type specimens were collected at depths of 5–31 m; photographic records indicate occurrence between approximately 10 and 30 m, usually on outer reef walls and coral bommies.

The distribution pattern suggests occurrence throughout the periphery of the Coral Triangle, extending eastward into the broader southwest Pacific. The species' range may be wider than current records indicate, with distribution likely limited primarily by the availability of suitable habitat and observer familiarity with the species.

== Behaviour and biology ==
Solenostomus snuffleupagus is most frequently encountered as solitary individuals or as male–female pairs, suggesting potential pair-bonding behaviour during reproductive periods, consistent with observations of other Solenostomus species. In the water column, the species mimics tufts of floating red algae, drifting with characteristic undulating movements that render it effectively invisible among the filamentous macroalgae of its reef habitat. Site fidelity appears strong, with one individual documented at the same location for at least six days while actively foraging in surge-affected waters.

Like all ghost pipefishes, females brood eggs within a marsupium formed by the fused pelvic fins, a reproductive arrangement unique among syngnathiform fishes in that brooding is performed by the female rather than the male. The genus feeds primarily on small crustaceans such as mysid shrimps, caridean shrimps, and zooplankton. Micro-CT imaging of the holotype revealed partially digested skeletal and caudal fin remains of a small teleost (approximately 8–10 mm in length) in the gut, representing the first documented instance of piscivory in Solenostomus.
