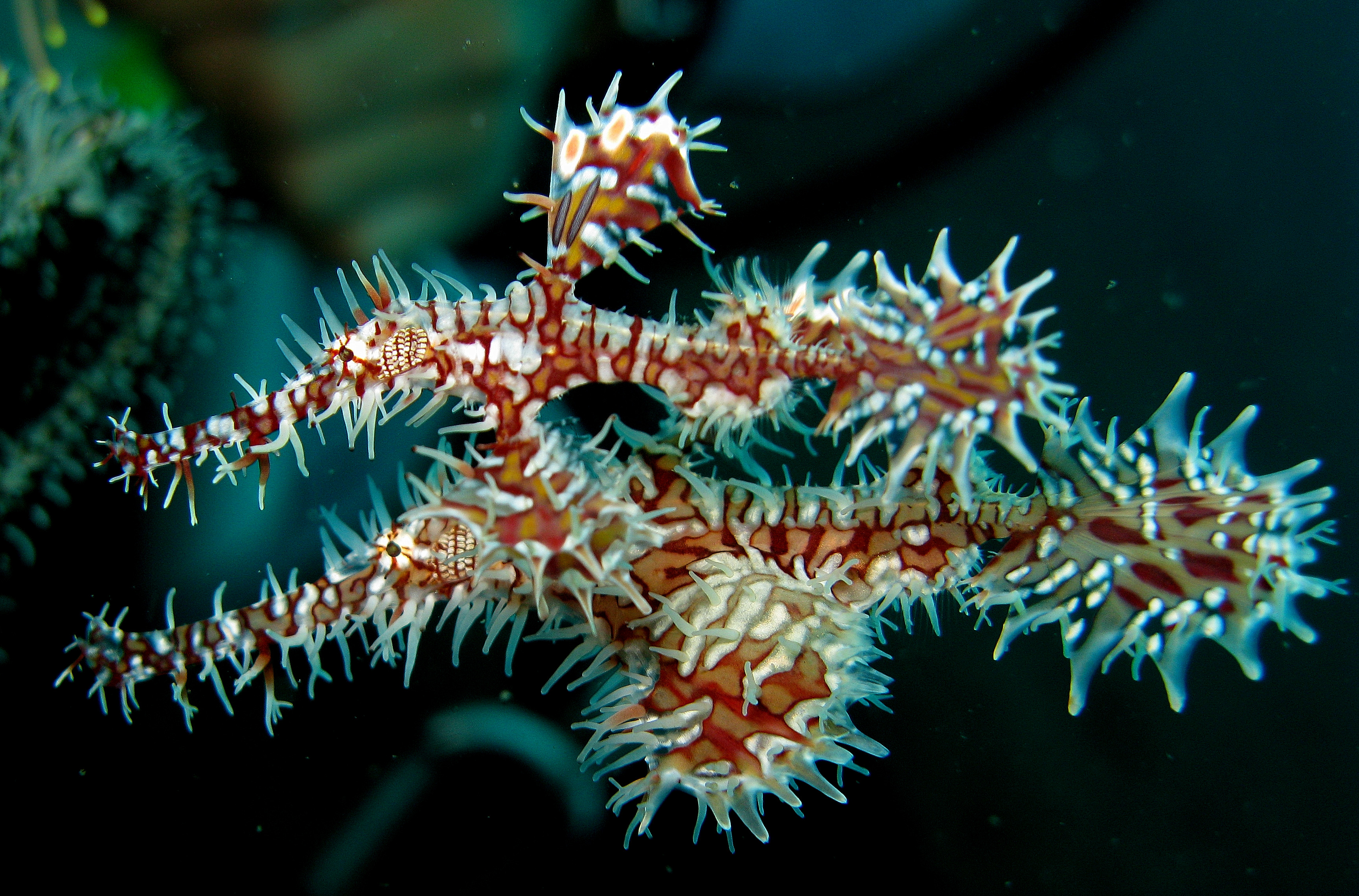
- Two Solenostomus paradoxus specimens

Scientific classification
- Kingdom: Animalia
- Phylum: Chordata
- Class: Actinopterygii
- Order: Syngnathiformes
- Suborder: Syngnathoidei
- Superfamily: Syngnathoidea
- Family: Solenostomidae; Nardo, 1843
- Genus: Solenostomus; Lacépède, 1803

Type species
- Fistularia paradoxa Pallas, 1770

Species
- See text

Synonyms
- Solenichthys Bleeker, 1864; Solenostomatichthys Bleeker, 1874

= Solenostomus =

Solenostomus Temporal range: 55.8–0 Ma Eocene to Present

Genus of fishes

Solenostomus, also known as the ghost pipefishes, false pipefishes, or tubemouth fishes, is a genus of fishes in the order Syngnathiformes. Solenostomus is the only genus in the family Solenostomidae and includes seven currently recognized species. Ghost pipefishes are related to pipefishes and seahorses and are found in tropical waters of the Indo-Pacific.

Members of this genus, none of which are longer than 17 cm (6.7 in), typically float nearly motionless with the mouth facing downward, around a background that makes them nearly impossible to see. They feed on tiny crustaceans, sucked through their long snouts. The diet of at least one species, S. snuffleupagus, also includes small bony fish. They live in open waters except during spawning, when they find a coral reef or muddy bottom, changing color and shape to minimize visibility.

In many respects they are similar to the related pipefishes, but can be distinguished by the presence of pelvic fins, a prominent, spiny, dorsal fin, and star-shaped plates on the skin. Unlike true pipefish, female ghost pipefishes use their enlarged pelvic fins to brood their eggs until they hatch.

Two fossil ghost pipefish genera, Calamostoma and Solenorhynchus, are known from the Eocene of Italy. These are placed in their own extinct subfamily, Solenorhynchinae.

== Taxonomy ==
The name Solenostomus combines the Ancient Greek words for pipe (solen; σωλήν) and mouth (stomus; στόμα).

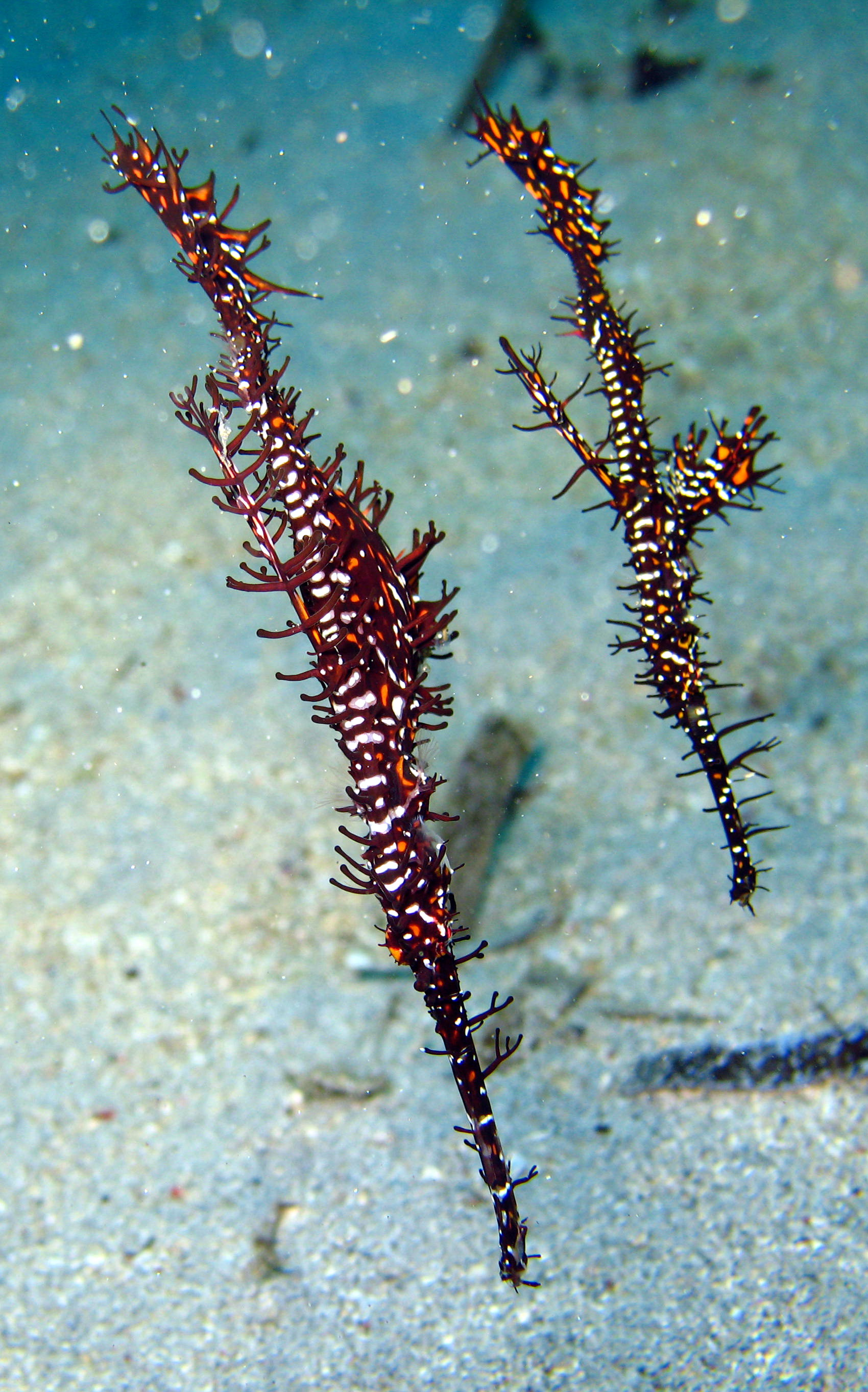
Ornate ghostpipefish, S. paradoxus

The following species are currently recognized:

- Solenostomus armatus M. C. W. Weber, 1913 (long-tailed ghost pipefish or armored pipefish)
- Solenostomus cyanopterus Bleeker, 1854 (robust ghost pipefish)
- Solenostomus halimeda J. W. Orr, Fritzsche & Randall, 2002 (Halimeda ghost pipefish)
- Solenostomus leptosoma S. Tanaka (I), 1908 (delicate ghost pipefish)
- Solenostomus paegnius Jordan & Thompson, 1914 (roughsnout ghost pipefish)
- Solenostomus paradoxus (Pallas, 1770) (ornate ghost pipefish or harlequin ghost pipefish)
- Solenostomus snuffleupagus Short & Harasti, 2026 (hairy ghost pipefish)

The following cladogram is based on a 2026 maximum likelihood phylogenetic tree derived from an analysis of COI genes; this study also described S. snuffleupagus:

- Solenostomus
  - - - - Solenostomus cyanopterus
        - Solenostomus cf. leptosoma
      - Solenostomus paegnius
    - Solenostomus paradoxus
  - Solenostomus snuffleupagus
- Maroubra perserrata
