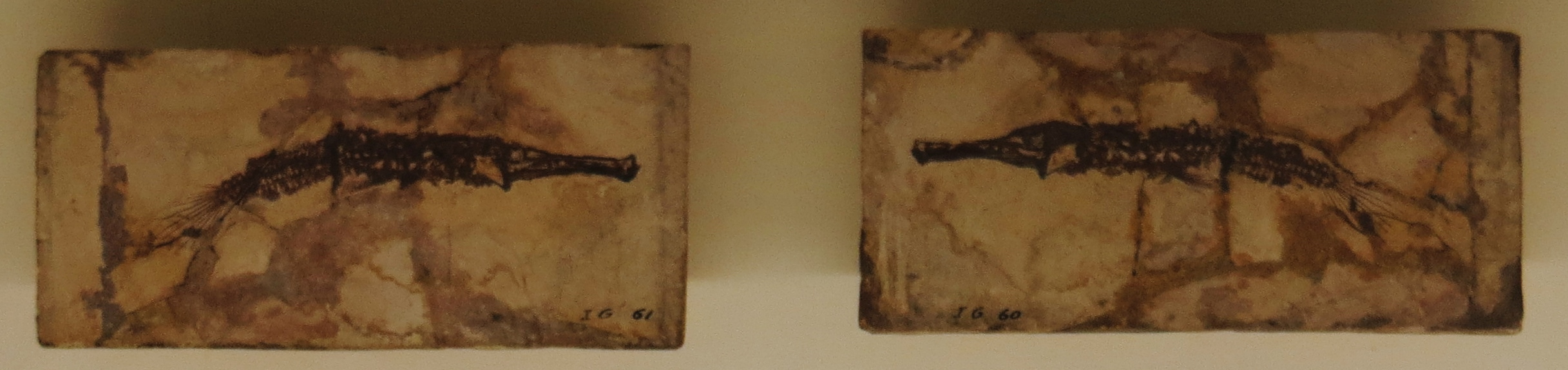
- Calamostoma lesiniforme

Scientific classification
- Domain: Eukaryota
- Kingdom: Animalia
- Phylum: Chordata
- Class: Actinopterygii
- Order: Syngnathiformes
- Family: Solenostomidae
- Subfamily: †Solenorhynchinae
- Genus: †Calamostoma; Agassiz, 1833
- Species: †C. lesiniforme

Binomial name
- †Calamostoma lesiniforme (Volta, 1796)

Synonyms
- †C. breviculum (Blainville, 1818)

= Calamostoma =

Calamostoma Temporal range: Early Eocene

Extinct genus of fishes

Calamostoma is an extinct relative of the ghost pipefish that lived during the early Eocene. It contains a single species, C. lesiniforme (sometimes erroneously referred to as C. breviculum) from the famous Monte Bolca site of Italy. It is one of the few known fossil ghost pipefishes. Calamostoma and the other Bolca solenostomid, Solenorhynchus, are both placed in the extinct subfamily Solenorhynchinae.

== See also ==
- Prehistoric fish
- List of prehistoric bony fish
