= Fritzsch =

Fritzsch is a German surname, also spelt Fritsch, Fritsche and Fritzsche, a patronymic derived from Friedrich.

Notable people with the surname include:

- Christian Fritzsch (1695–1769), German engraver
- Cladius Detlev Fritzsch (1765–1841), Danish painter
- Harald Fritzsch (1943–2022), German physicist
- Johannes Fritzsch (born 1960), German conductor
- Karl Fritzsch (1903–1945), German SS concentration camp commandant who was the first to use Zyklon B for mass murder
- Sebastian Fritzsch (born 1977), German film director, photographer and visual artist
- Walter Fritzsch (1920–1997), German footballer and trainer

== See also ==
- Variations of the name:
  - Fritsch
  - Fritsche
  - Fritzsche
- Frič, Czechized variation of the name
