= Oliver Fritzsche =

German politician (born 1977)

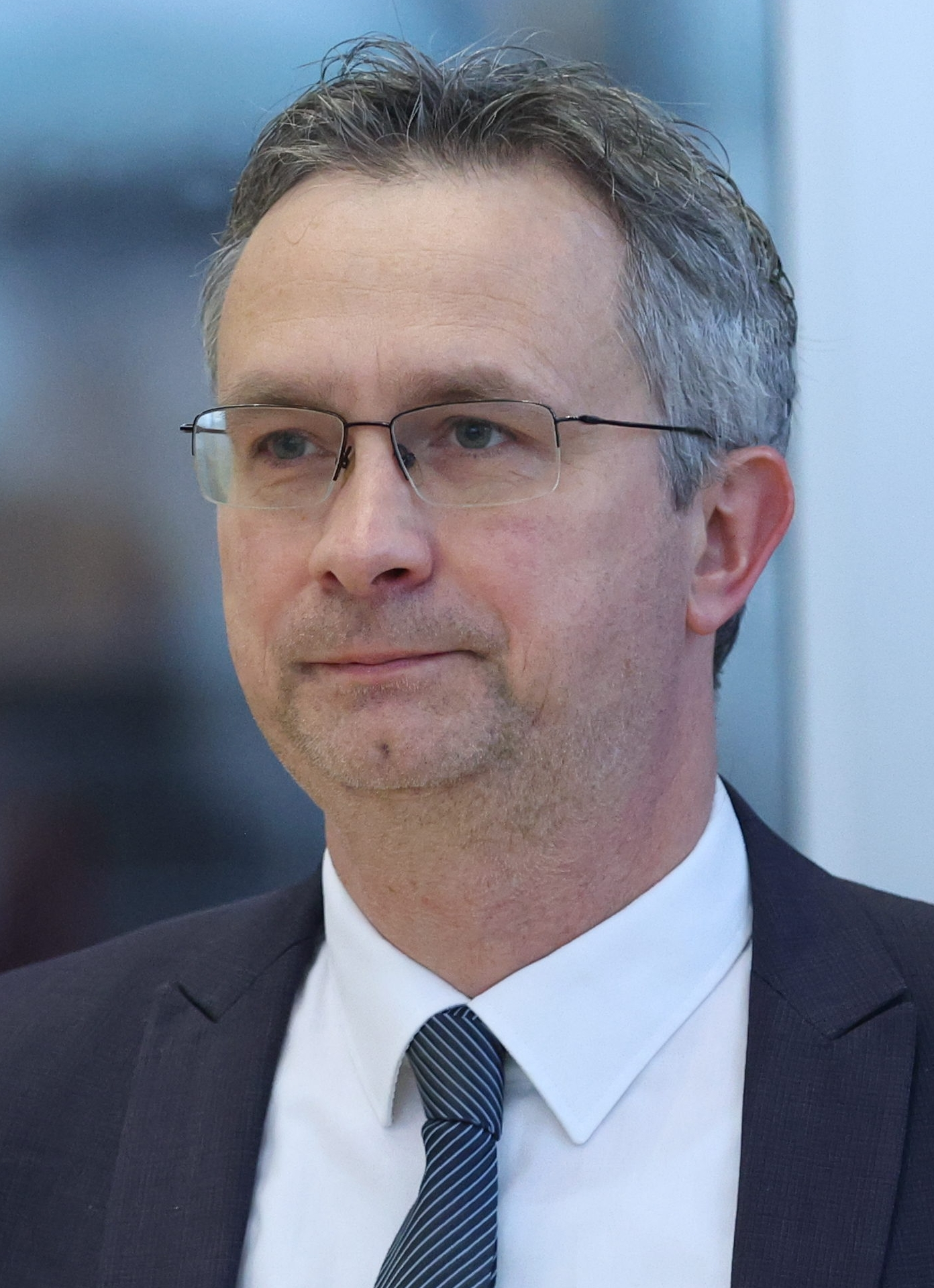
- Fritzsche in 2024

Member of the Landtag of Saxony
- Incumbent
- Assumed office 29 September 2009
- Preceded by: Christian Steinbach
- Constituency: Leipzig Land 2

Personal details
- Born: 9 September 1977 (age 48) Leipzig
- Party: Christian Democratic Union (since 2004)

Peter Oliver Fritzsche (born 9 September 1977 in Leipzig) is a German politician serving as a member of the Landtag of Saxony since 2009. He has served as chairman of the infrastructure and regional development committee since 2025.
