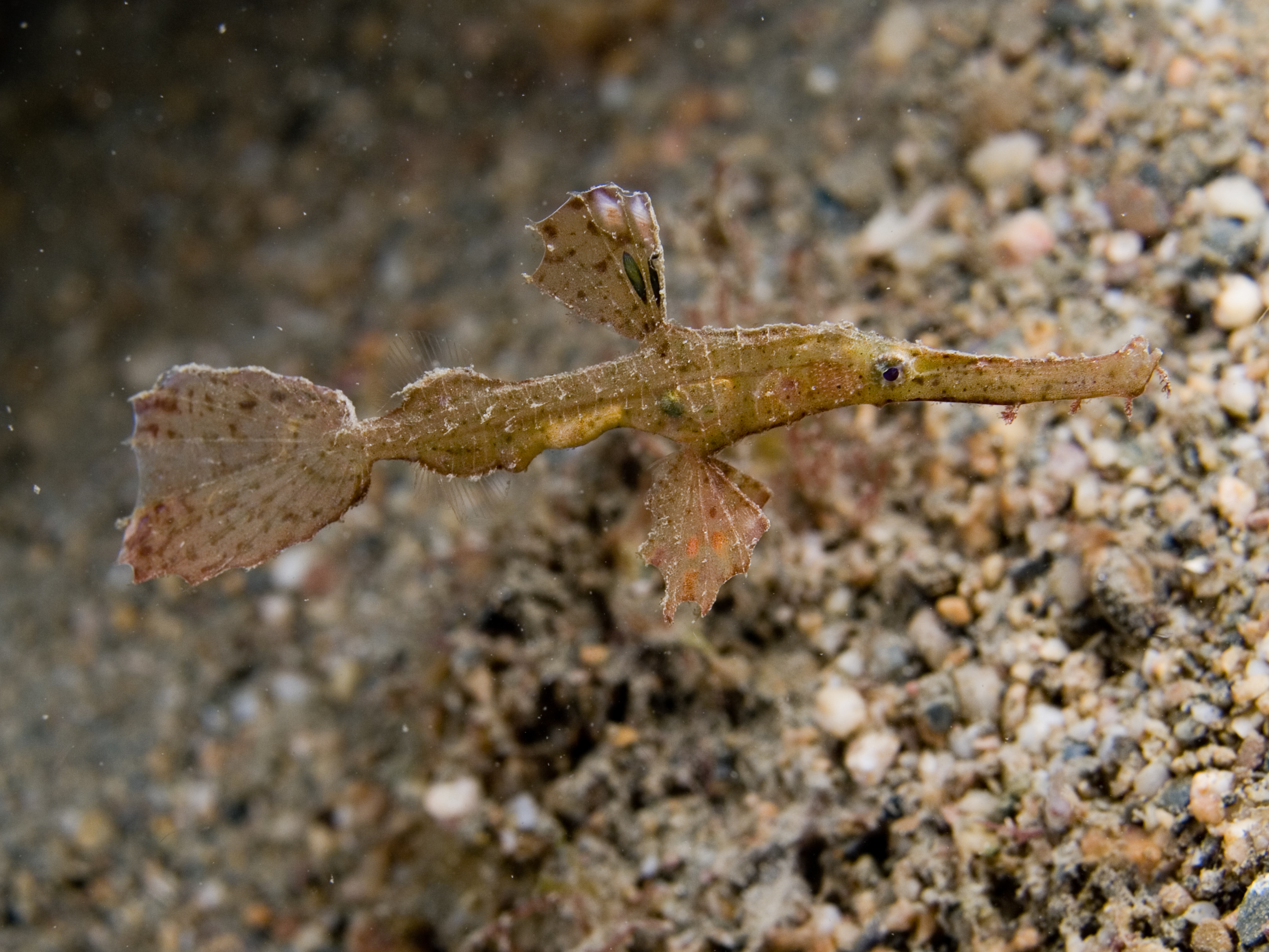

Scientific classification
- Kingdom: Animalia
- Phylum: Chordata
- Class: Actinopterygii
- Order: Syngnathiformes
- Family: Solenostomidae
- Genus: Solenostomus
- Species: S. leptosoma

Binomial name
- Solenostomus leptosoma Tanaka, 1908

= Solenostomus leptosoma =

Species of fish

Solenostomus leptosoma, the delicate ghost pipefish is a species of false pipefish from the family Solenostomidae. It is an Indo-Pacific species which occurs from the Mascarene Islands east to Japan, Indonesia and Australia. It is mainly found along the edge of reefs where the reef borders on bordering on open sand substrates. They are mainly pelagic in their early life stages until they mature and settle on the substrate to breed. The females carry the eggs in a brood pouch formed by their modified pelvic fins.

There is a lack of documentation regarding the species' range in Australia, and no specimens found there have been identified as members of the species. The prevalence in Australia is based on Allen & Erdmann (2012) and Kuiter (2009). Some researchers identified Solenostomus leptosoma as a junior synonym of S. paradoxus (see Kuiter 1993). According to Orr & Fritsche (1993), there is uncertainty over the species' status. Furthermore, Orr et al. (2002) thought that Kuiter (2000)'s usage of the name S. leptosoma was based on an unnamed species and failed to recognize S. leptosoma. As a result, the phrase used here is figurative.
