= Syngnathus macrobrachium =

Large-fin pipefish

Conservation status
- Data Deficient (IUCN 3.1)

Scientific classification
- Domain: Eukaryota
- Kingdom: Animalia
- Phylum: Chordata
- Class: Actinopterygii
- Order: Syngnathiformes
- Family: Syngnathidae
- Genus: Syngnathus
- Species: S. macrobrachium

Binomial name
- Syngnathus macrobrachium Fritzsche, 1980

Species of fish

Syngnathus macrobrachium (large-fin pipefish) is a species of pipefishes, which is common in the southern-eastern Pacific in the coastal waters from Tumbes (Peru) to Puerto Montt (Chile). It is a marine subtropical demersal fish, up to 22.5 centimetres (8.9 in) length. Very little is known about this species' biology but it is thought that it lives over sand and other soft sea beds in shallow coastal waters including estuaries and brackish lagoons. This species is ovoviviparous, the males brood the fertilised eggs below the tail before giving birth to the larvae.
