= Stephan Fritsch =

German artist

Stephan Fritsch (born 1962 in Stuttgart, Germany, died 2014) was a German artist who lived and worked in Munich (Germany) and the last years in Salzburg, Austria.

== Life ==
He studied painting at the Academy of Fine Arts in Munich with Professor Helmut Sturm from 1985 to 1990. From 1996-2002 he worked as a painting assistant with Professor Jerry Zeniuk. He lectured in the United States at the School of the Art Institute, Chicago in 2000, the Art Academy of Cincinnati in 2001, and at Mills College in 2009. Fritsch died in 2014.

== Awards ==
His awards include the Award for Visual Arts of the City of Munich in 1993, the Promotion Prize for Fine Arts of the Free State of Bavaria in 1995, the Erwin and Gisela von Steiner Foundation in 1997, the Artist in Residence of the Free State of Bavaria from 2001–2004, and a studio scholarship with the Oswalkd-Zitzelsberger Foundation from 2007-2009

== Public collections ==
Fritsch's work is in the public collections of:

- Art Collection of the Bavarian State, Munich
- Pinakothek der Moderne, Munich
- Artothek, Munich
- Museum of Christian Art, Passau
- Museum Katharinenhof, Kranenburg
- National Gallery, Harare, Zimbabwe
- Museum of Modern Art GuangDong, Guangzhou, China
