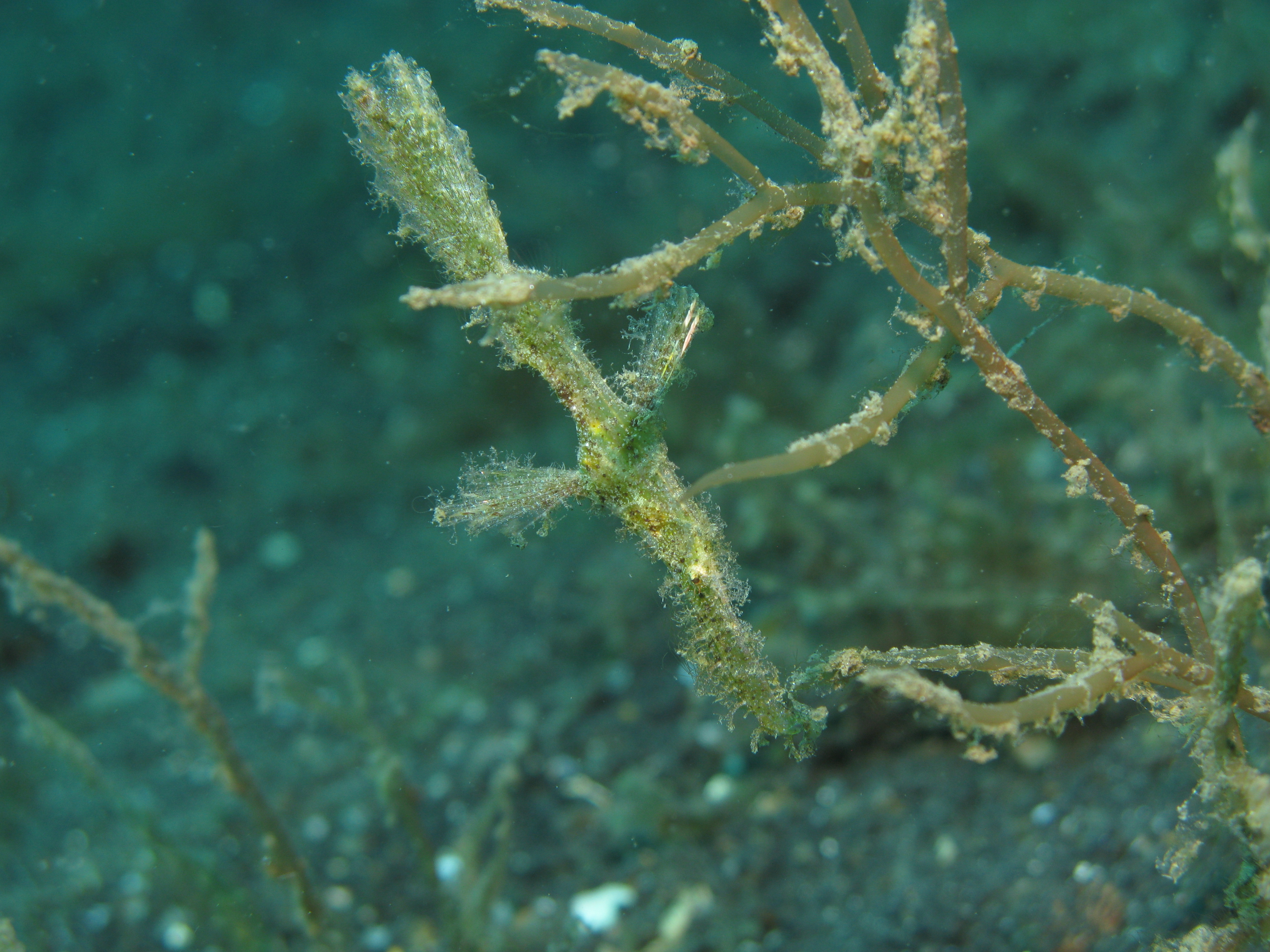

Scientific classification
- Kingdom: Animalia
- Phylum: Chordata
- Class: Actinopterygii
- Division: Teleostei
- Order: Syngnathiformes
- Family: Solenostomidae
- Genus: Solenostomus
- Species: S. paegnius

Binomial name
- Solenostomus paegnius Jordan & Thompson, 1914

Synonyms
- Solenichthys paegnius (Jordan & Thompson, 1914)

= Solenostomus paegnius =

Species of fish

Solenostomus paegnius, the roughsnout ghost pipefish is a species of ghost pipefish from the family Solenostomidae. It is an Indo-Pacific species which occurs from the Red Sea east to Japan and Australia. It occurs over algal/rubble reefs and sandy sea beds, often below depths of 10 metres (33 ft) They are largely pelagic until they settle on the substrate to breed.
