= Long-tailed ghost pipefish =

Conservation status
- Least Concern (IUCN 3.1)

Scientific classification
- Kingdom: Animalia
- Phylum: Chordata
- Class: Actinopterygii
- Order: Syngnathiformes
- Family: Solenostomidae
- Genus: Solenostomus
- Species: S. armatus

Binomial name
- Solenostomus armatus M. C. W. Weber, 1913

Synonyms
- Solenichthys armatus (Weber, 1913)

Species of fish

The long-tailed ghost pipefish or armored ghost pipefish (Solenostomus armatus) is a ghost pipefish in the family Solenostomidae. The species name comes from the Greek armatura, referring to this fish's armor of dermal plates. Solenostomus leptosoma is now considered a synonym of S. armatus, the valid species identification.

== Physical appearance ==
S. armatus reaches a maximum length of 5.7 cm (standard length) and vary in color from dark red to beige. Compared to other ghost pipefishes, they possess an elongated caudal tail and peduncle, as indicated by their common name.

== Biology ==
The long-tailed ghost pipefish is a tropical marine species, found over muddy bottoms near reefs in the western Pacific Ocean. Like all ghost pipefish, females carry the eggs in pelvic fins that become modified to form a brood pouch.

== Conservation status ==
The IUCN conservation status of S. armatus is of least concern.
