= Leipzig Land 2 =

State electoral district of Germany

22: Leipzig Land 2
- Electoral district for the Landtag of Saxony
- Leipzig Land 2 in 2024
- District: Leipzig (district)
- Electorate: 58,654 (2024)
- Major settlements: Böhlen, Groitzsch, Markkleeberg, Markranstädt, Pegau, and Zwenkau

Current electoral district
- Party: CDU
- Member: Oliver Fritzsche

Leipzig Land 2 is an electoral constituency (German: Wahlkreis) represented in the Landtag of Saxony. It elects one member via first-past-the-post voting. Under the constituency numbering system, it is designated as constituency 22. It is within the district of Leipzig.

== Geography ==
The constituency comprises the towns of Böhlen, Groitzsch, Markkleeberg, Markranstädt, Pegau, and Zwenkau, and the municipality of Elstertrebnitz within the district of Leipzig.

There were 58,654 eligible voters in 2024.

== Members ==
Election	Member	Party	%
2014	Oliver Fritzsche	CDU	39.1
2019	Oliver Fritzsche	CDU	33.0
2024	Oliver Fritzsche	CDU	37.2

== Election results ==
=== 2024 election ===
State election (2024): Leipzig Land 2
Notes:	Blue background denotes the winner of the electorate vote. Pink background denotes a candidate elected from their party list. Yellow background denotes an electorate win by a list member, or other incumbent. A ✓ or ✗ denotes status of any incumbent, win or lose respectively.						
Party	Candidate	Votes	%	±%	Party votes	%	±%
CDU	✓ Oliver Fritzsche	16,206	37.2	▲4.3	15,564	35.6	Steady
AfD	Bernhard Ulrich Oehme	12,914	29.7	▲6.4	11,686	26.8	▲3.5
BSW					4,984	11.4	
SPD	Petra Köpping	6,740	15.5	▼1.1	4,284	9.8	▼0.9
FW	Adalbert Rösch	2,873	6.6	▲0.4	1,178	2.7	▼1.1
Left	Adelheid Noack	1,702	3.9	▼0.5	1,389	3.2	▼5.5
Greens	Marie Rose Müser	1,315	3.0	▼4.3	2,095	4.8	▼3.5
FDP	Stephan Mielsch	665	1.5	▼3.2	451	1.0	▼3.5
Independent	Roland Voigt	648	1.5				
Freie Sachsen	Ingo Hauser	450	1.0		775	1.8	
APT					458	1.0	
PARTEI					325	0.7	▼0.5
BD					108	0.2	
Pirates					85	0.2	
dieBasis					73	0.2	
Values					70	0.2	
V-Partei3					66	0.2	
BüSo					33	0.1	
ÖDP					31	0.1	
Bündnis C					23	0.1	
Informal votes		503			338		
Total valid votes		43,513			43,678		
Turnout		44,016	75.0	▲13.1			
CDU hold	Majority	3,292	7.5				

=== 2019 election ===
State election (2019): Lipzig Land 2
Notes:	Blue background denotes the winner of the electorate vote. Pink background denotes a candidate elected from their party list. Yellow background denotes an electorate win by a list member, or other incumbent. A ✓ or ✗ denotes status of any incumbent, win or lose respectively.						
Party	Candidate	Votes	%	±%	Party votes	%	±%
CDU	✓ Oliver Fritzsche	12,686	33.0	▼6.1	13,727	35.6	▼6.3
AfD	Elke Gärtner	8,967	23.3	▲16.6	8,966	23.3	▲16.3
SPD	Petra Köpping	6,366	16.5	▼7.4	4,129	10.7	▼5.7
Left	René Jalaß	3,439	8.9	▼8.4	3,341	8.7	▼8.6
Greens	Tommy Penk	2,833	7.4	▲2.3	3,199	8.3	▲2.6
FW	Heike Oehlert	2,372	6.2		1,469	3.8	▲2.6
FDP	Anja Jonas	1,809	4.7	▲1.1	1,754	4.6	▲0.3
APT					610	1.6	▲0.4
PARTEI					489	1.3	▲1.0
Verjüngungsforschung					204	0.5	
The Blue Party					120	0.3	
NPD					116	0.3	▼3.0
ÖDP					102	0.3	
Pirates					95	0.2	▼0.6
PDV					55	0.1	
Humanists					51	0.1	
Awakening of German Patriots - Central Germany					49	0.1	
DKP					32	0.1	
BüSo					25	0.1	▼0.1
Informal votes		431			370		
Total valid votes		38,472			38,533		
Turnout		38,903	66.2	▲18.7			
CDU hold	Majority	3,719	9.7	▼5.5			

=== 2014 election ===
State election (2014): Leipzig Land 2
Notes:	Blue background denotes the winner of the electorate vote. Pink background denotes a candidate elected from their party list. Yellow background denotes an electorate win by a list member, or other incumbent. A ✓ or ✗ denotes status of any incumbent, win or lose respectively.						
Party	Candidate	Votes	%	±%	Party votes	%	±%
CDU	Oliver Fritzsche	10,760	39.1		11,556	41.9	
SPD		6,585	23.9		4,515	16.4	
Left		4,767	17.3		4,772	17.3	
AfD		1,857	6.7		1,939	7.0	
Greens		1,400	5.1		1,580	5.7	
FDP		983	3.6		1,172	4.3	
NPD		758	2.8		919	3.3	
FW					336	1.2	
APT					330	1.2	
Pirates		283	1.0		213	0.8	
PARTEI					88	0.3	
BüSo		146	0.5		67	0.2	
DSU					45	0.2	
Pro Germany Citizens' Movement					43	0.2	
Informal votes		336			300		
Total valid votes		27,539			27,575		
Turnout		27,875	47.5	▼10.6			
CDU win new seat	Majority	4,1,75	15.2				

== See also ==
- Politics of Saxony
- Landtag of Saxony
