= John Fritsche Jr. =

Swiss-American ice hockey player (born 1991)

- Born: September 3, 1991 (age 33); Bellinzona, Ticino, CHE
- Height: 6 ft 1 in (185 cm)
- Weight: 187 lb (85 kg; 13 st 5 lb)
- Position: Right wing
- Shot: Right
- Played for: SC Bern; HC Fribourg-Gottéron; Lausanne HC; Genève-Servette HC
- Playing career: 2011–2021

John Fritsche Jr. (born September 3, 1991) is a Swiss-American former professional ice hockey forward.

== Personal life ==
His father, John Fritsche Sr., was a longtime player in Switzerland for HC Ambri-Piotta, HC Lugano and EV Zug, played for the United States at the 1990 World Hockey Championship, and coached the Ohio Junior Blue Jackets.
