= Ohio Junior Blue Jackets =

- City: Columbus, Ohio
- League: United States Hockey League
- Founded: 1990
- Folded: 2008
- Home arena: Nationwide Arena
- Colors: Navy, red, white
- General manager: Don Harkins
- Head coach: John Fritsche Sr.
- Media: The Columbus Dispatch

Franchise history
- 1990–2006: Cleveland Jr. Barons
- 2006–2008: Ohio Junior Blue Jackets

The Ohio Junior Blue Jackets were a Tier 1 junior ice hockey team playing in the East Division of the United States Hockey League (USHL). The 2006–07 USHL media guide (p. 37) lists the Ohio Junior Blue Jackets as the successor to the Thunder Bay Flyers, who played their last USHL game in 2000; however, the team infrastructure was based upon a move of the Cleveland Junior Barons of the NAHL. The Junior Blue Jackets' home ice was at Nationwide Arena, which is also home to the National Hockey League team Columbus Blue Jackets. The franchise was bought, moved to Columbus, and promoted to Tier 1 USHL status ahead of the 2006–07 season. Despite the Blue Jackets playing in a NHL arena the teams on ice play wasn’t as good. The Blue Jackets had amounted to 29 wins and 68 loses in the teams 2 years in the USHL they had finished 5th in the Eastern Conference in the 2006-2007 season and 6th in the Eastern Conference. The Blue Jackets had beaten out the Chicago Steel in the 2006-2007 season. The Blue Jackets had around 1,000-1,500 fans at Nationwide Arena only filling up 5 to 8 of the lower bowl sections leaving 70 to 75 completely empty.

== Ceased Operations ==
It was announced on May 11, 2008 that the Jr. Blue Jackets ceased operations for the 2008–2009 season after the owners and league worked to find a suitable location where this franchise could be a success. After finding no location on short notice for the upcoming season, the team ceased operations.

The USHL Board of Governors approved the transfer of 10–12 veteran players on Ohio's protected list to the Fargo Force, an expansion team for the 2008–2009 season. With the agreement the expansion draft was cancelled and Fargo had to give up their first three rounds picks of the USHL Entry Draft. Note: "All players on the Ohio affiliate list will become free agents" (USHL).
