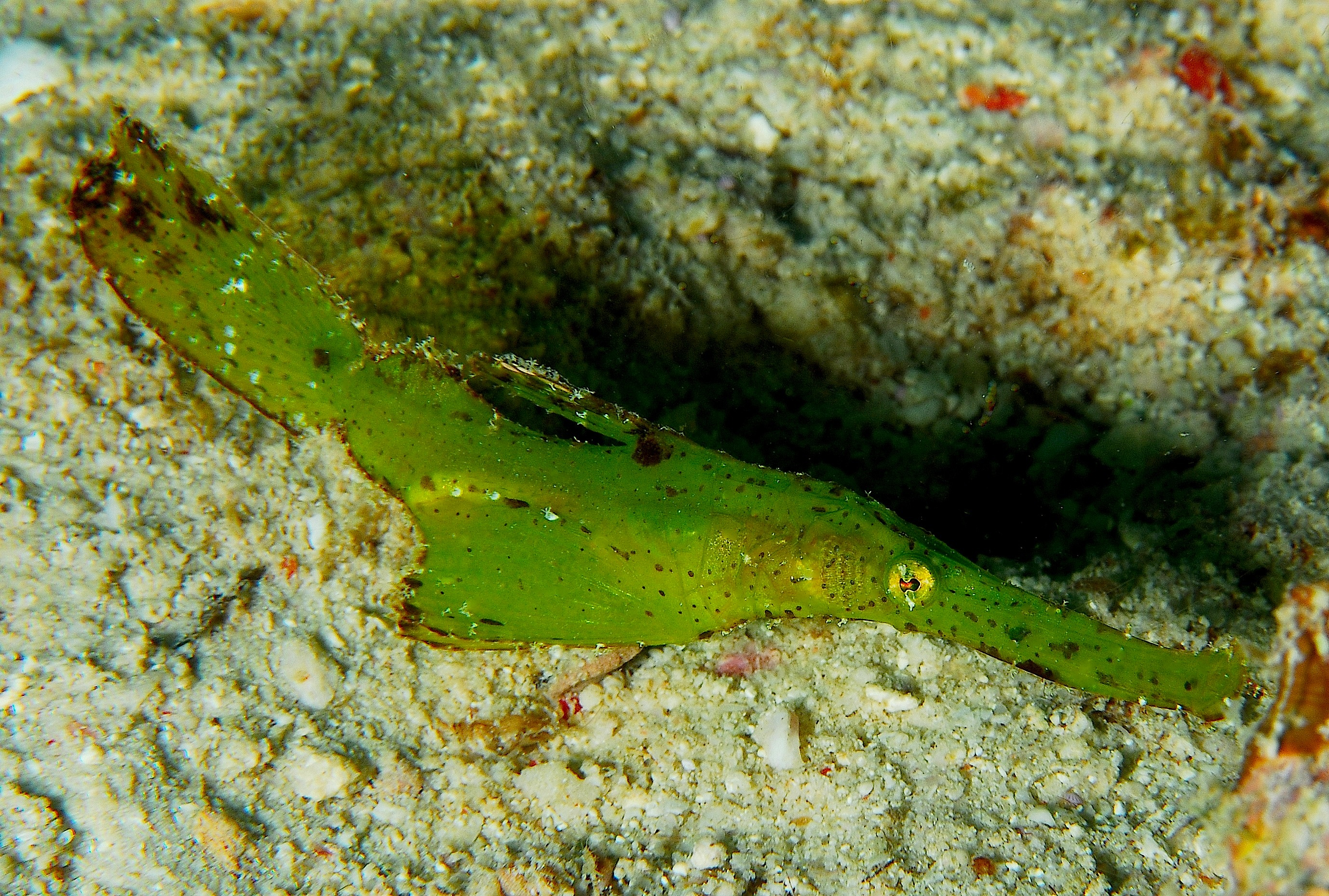

Conservation status
- Least Concern (IUCN 3.1)

Scientific classification
- Kingdom: Animalia
- Phylum: Chordata
- Class: Actinopterygii
- Order: Syngnathiformes
- Family: Solenostomidae
- Genus: Solenostomus
- Species: S. cyanopterus

Binomial name
- Solenostomus cyanopterus Bleeker, 1854

Synonyms
- Solenostomus bleekerii Duméril, 1870; Solenostomatichthys bleekeri (Duméril, 1870); Solenichthys raceki Whitley, 1955

= Robust ghost pipefish =

Species of fish

The robust ghost pipefish (Solenostomus cyanopterus), also known as the blue-finned ghost pipefish, Racek's ghost pipefish, robust-snouted ghost pipefish, or the squaretail ghost-pipefish, is a species of false pipefish belonging to the family Solenostomidae. Its appearance can vary greatly due to its ability to change colors over several hours, but the general body shape and fin shapes allow it to mimic a piece of seagrass.

Due to a wide range and adaptability to habitat, the robust ghost pipefish is considered a species of least concern by the IUCN. Its natural camouflage abilities allow it to evade predators while seeking out its own prey, which includes bottom-dwelling crustaceans and plankton. It has no teeth, nor proper scales, but scattered osseous plates offer a form of protection.

It has a short lifespan and can only reproduce once. Larvae are planktonic, but are relatively well-developed; the mother releases them into the water column from her brood-pouch, which is a sexually-dimorphic feature formed from her two pelvic fins.

== Taxonomy ==
The robust ghost pipefish was originally described by Dutch ichthyologist Pieter Bleeker in 1854. It also momentarily went by Solenostomus bleekerii, given by French zoologist André Marie Constant Duméril to honor Bleeker in 1870, but this name has since been synonymized. The name Solenichthys raceki was also in consideration, given by Australian ichthyologist Gilbert Percy Whitley in 1955.

The family to which the robust ghost pipefish belongs, Solenostomidae, is related to the family of true pipefishes and seahorses, Syngnathidae, and they share the order Syngnathiformes. Similarities can be seen in the elongated snouts, but there are various differences between families. These include females caring for the eggs in Solenostomidae, versus males in Syngnathidae, and a spiny dorsal fin versus the absence of spines.

There is the distinct possibility that Solenostomus cyanopterus may be a cryptic species - that is, several species currently considered synonymous due to significant overlap in various areas. Its wide range, variable appearance, and somewhat-understudied nature all contribute to this possibility.

Solenostomidae itself is a monotypic taxon, home only to the genus Solenostomus.

=== Etymology ===
The genus name "solenostomus" comes from Greek; "solen" means "tube", and "stoma" means "mouth" or "opening". The word "cyanopterus" is also from Greek, and is from "cyanos", meaning "blue", and "pteron", meaning "wing". This is in reference to the dark-blue spots frequently present on the first few spiny rays of the dorsal fin.

The common name "ghost pipefish" originates in the camouflage abilities of the genus. "Robust" specifically refers to the largest species.

== Description ==
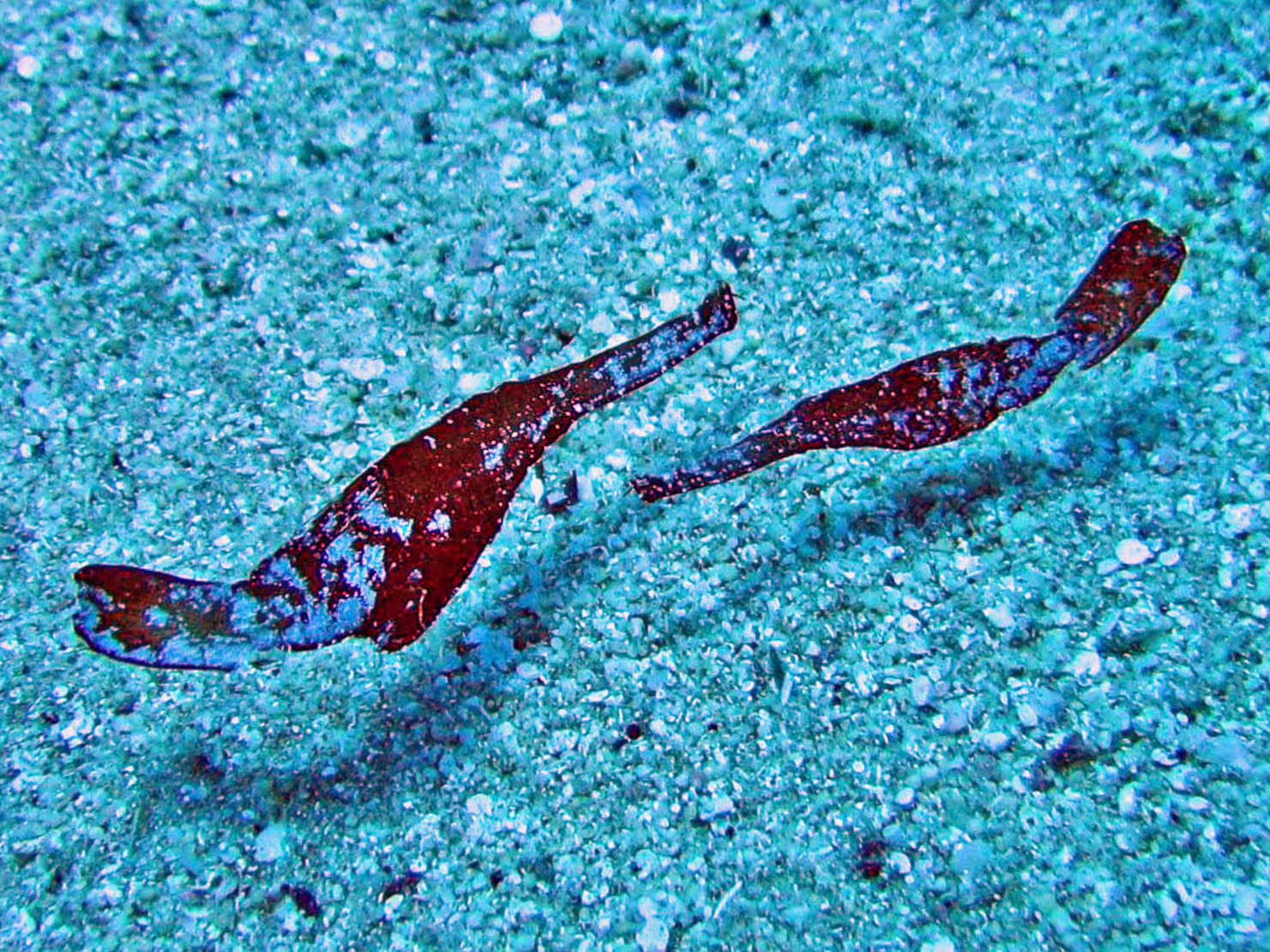
Solenostomus cyanopterus at Sharm el Sheik

The robust ghost pipefish can reach a length of 17 cm (6.7 in) in total length (TL), which makes it the largest of the ghost pipefishes. It has a long snout, with the mouth positioned at the end, and the jaws are largely toothless. Its tail is also long in comparison to its body. The caudal fin may be truncated, rounded, or lanceolate, and the caudal peduncle is quite short, sometimes absent. Its appearance, with a long slender snout and large fins, helps it mimic a piece of drifting seagrass.

The body may be gray, brown, pink, yellow, or bright green, with small black and white dots, and the robust ghost pipefish is capable of gradual color changes depending upon its environment (taking 24 to 36 hours). There are several dark-blue spots on the first few spiny rays of the dorsal fin that may appear black in preserved specimens. It is largely scaleless, but there are 25–35 stellate (star-shaped) bony plates on the skin. The lateral line is not visible.

=== Sexual dimorphism ===
Sexual dimorphism in the robust ghost pipefish manifests in multiple ways. In males, the pelvic fins remain unchanged, but in females, they merge to form a brood pouch. In addition, females are the larger of the two sexes. The olfactory organ is a smooth pit in females, but is equipped with radiating folds (called lamellae) in the males.

== Distribution and habitat ==
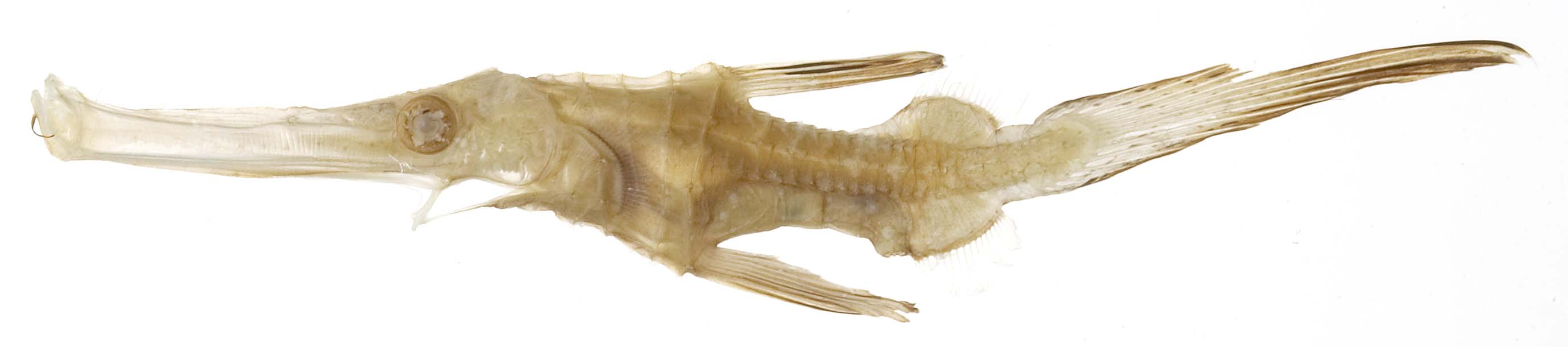
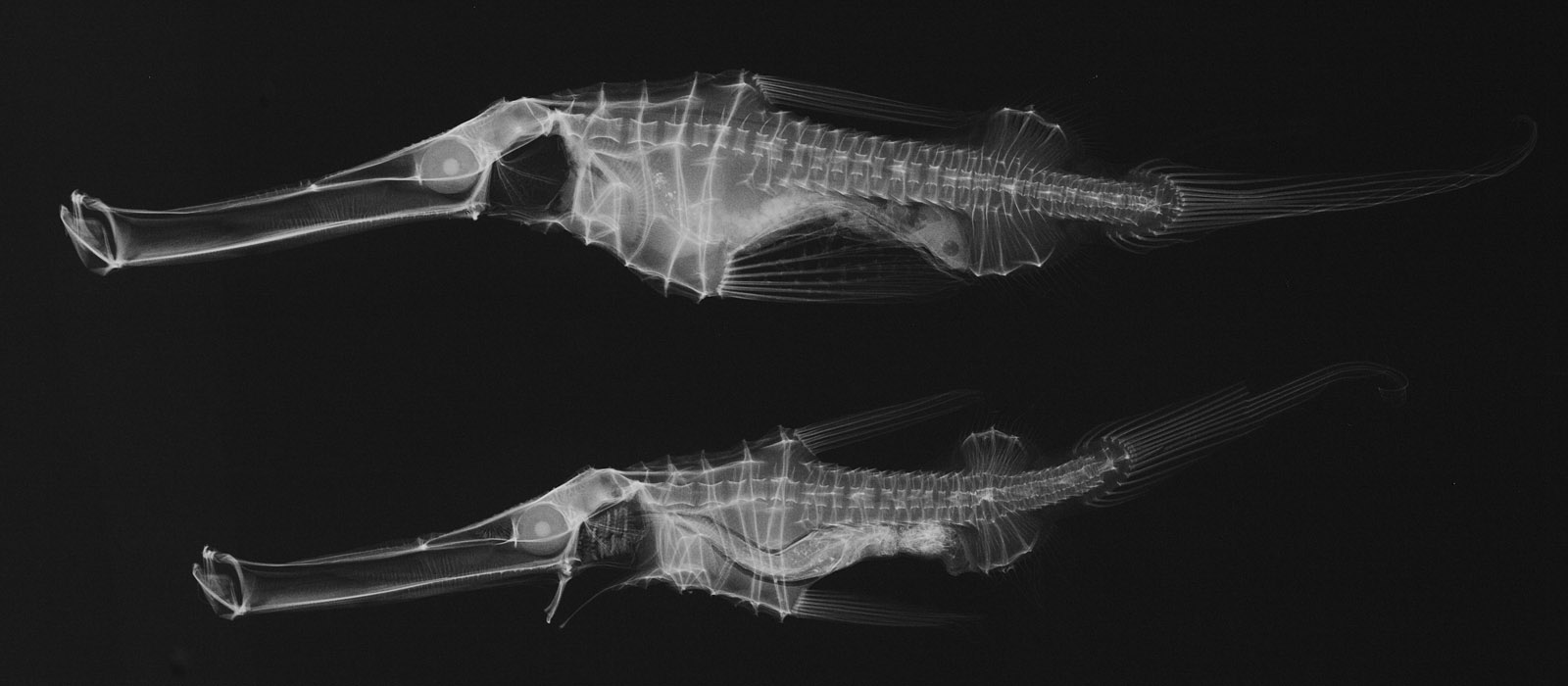
Solenostomus cyanopterus, conventional and X-ray images

This species lives in the Red Sea and in the tropical Indo-Pacific, from the coast of East Africa to Fiji, southern Japan, and Australia. Its wide range increases its general chances for survival as a species, and it can adapt to a variety of habitats therein. While the larvae and young are largely pelagic, adults can be found on coastal reefs and weedy areas, at depths of 2–25 m (6 ft 7 in – 82 ft 0 in). Their preferred substrates include coral, vegetation, and sand.

=== Presence in aquaria ===
The robust ghost pipefish is possibly taken from the wild for the aquarium trade, but not at such a rate that its population numbers are suffering. Hobbyists, while aware of the fish, advise that it is best left to public aquariums to keep captive specimens. There is at least one record of another species of ghost pipefish reproducing in captivity, but records for Solenostomus cyanopterus specifically are sparse.

== Ecology and behavior ==
The robust ghost pipefish is a slow-moving and placid species. When disturbed, it will often move into nearby shelter, such as seagrass for camouflage or coral for protection. The lifespan is relatively short, consisting of a single reproductive period before death.

=== Diet and feeding ===
Robust ghost pipefish are bottom-feeders, swimming snout-down near the substrate to capture any benthic invertebrates they come across. Because they are slow-moving, they largely rely on their own camouflage to employ ambush hunting. Their tube-shaped snouts have no teeth, so they simply suck up their prey whole.

=== Reproduction ===
Unlike any other fishes in the order Syngnathiformes, female members of Solenostomus take care of the eggs (rather than the male). The two pelvic fins unite to form a brood-pouch in which the eggs are protected. Each fish reproduces only once during its life cycle, and members of the species form pairs for life.

Egg envelopes are attached to small extensions of the skin only present in female specimens, where they can safely incubate inside the brood-pouch. When the eggs are ready to hatch, the female releases them into the water column, where the larvae drift with the currents. The larvae are well-developed, approximately 3 mm long, with fully formed eyes, mouths, and spines.

== Conservation status ==
The robust ghost pipefish is a species of least concern for the IUCN. It has a wide range, well-adapted camouflage abilities, and can withstand a variety of habitat conditions; all of these support a high survivability rate for the species. It is of little interest to the ornamental fish industry due to its short lifespan and failure to thrive in captivity, so it is not at risk for over-collection.
