= Chocolate pipefish =

Conservation status
- Data Deficient (IUCN 3.1)

Scientific classification
- Domain: Eukaryota
- Kingdom: Animalia
- Phylum: Chordata
- Class: Actinopterygii
- Order: Syngnathiformes
- Family: Syngnathidae
- Genus: Syngnathus
- Species: S. euchrous

Binomial name
- Syngnathus euchrous Fritzsche, 1980

Species of fish

The Chocolate pipefish (Syngnathus euchrous) is a species of the pipefishes. Widespread in the Eastern Pacific from Redondo Beach in southern California, United States, to central Baja California, Mexico. Marine subtropical demersal fish, up to 25 cm length.
