= Guadalupe pipefish =

Conservation status
- Least Concern (IUCN 3.1)

Scientific classification
- Domain: Eukaryota
- Kingdom: Animalia
- Phylum: Chordata
- Class: Actinopterygii
- Order: Syngnathiformes
- Family: Syngnathidae
- Genus: Syngnathus
- Species: S. insulae

Binomial name
- Syngnathus insulae Fritzsche, 1980

Species of fish

Guadalupe pipefish (Syngnathus insulae) is a pipefish species, inhabits the Eastern Central Pacific, endemic to Guadalupe Island in Mexico. Marine subtropical demersal fish, up to 20.4 centimetres (8.0 in) length.
