= Michael Fritsch =

German economist

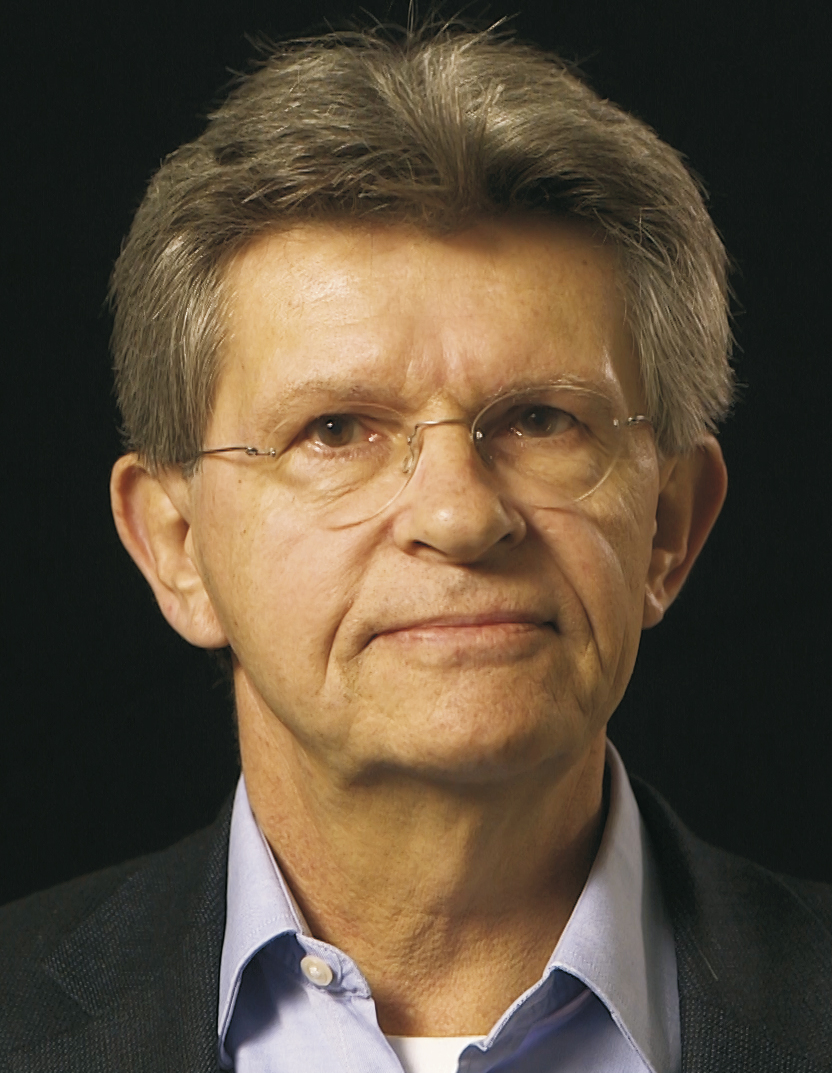
A photo of Michael Fritsch

Michael Fritsch is professor (emeritus) of Economics at the Friedrich Schiller University Jena, Germany. He is also an Associate Editor of the academic journal Small Business Economics.

== Career ==
Michael Fritsch studied economics at Technische Universität Berlin and finished his exam as Diplom-Volkswirt (Master of Economics) in 1977. He was a research associate and a senior research fellow at the Institute of Economics of Technische Universität Berlin where he finished his Ph.D. (Dr. rer. oec.) in 1982 and received his Habilitation for Economics in 1989. From 1990 to 1992 Michael Fritsch acted as Interim Chair of Economic Policy at Technische Universität Berlin. In 1992 he became Full Professor of Economics and Chair of Economic Policy at the School of Economics and Business Administration of the TU Bergakademie Freiberg. Since 2006 Prof. Fritsch has been Chair of Business Dynamics, Innovation, and Economic Change at the School of Economics and Business Administration of Friedrich Schiller University of Jena.

== Research ==
The main fields of research of Michael Fritsch are entrepreneurship and innovation. His research on entrepreneurship has focused on the determinants of new business formation and on the effect of new businesses on economic development. In the field of innovation he has analyzed cooperative relationships and the division of innovative labor. A particular interest was on the role of universities in regional innovation systems. Further research of Michael Fritsch deals with the contribution of creativity, particularly artistic activity, to economic development. He has also worked on the efficiency of markets and the causes for market failure. Recent research by Michael Fritsch is focussing on the role of knowledge, entrepreneurship, and cultural factors in long-term regional development trajectories.

== Publications ==
Michael Fritsch is the author of more than 18 books and comprehensive studies. He has published more than 150 articles in scholarly journals and has made about 160 contributions to edited volumes. He was an editor of more than 25 books and special issues of academic journals. His textbook „Marktversagen und Wirtschaftspolitik – Mikroökonomische Grundlagen staatlichen Handelns“ (‚Market Failure and Economic Policy – Microeconomic Foundations of Economic Policy‘) is currently available in the 10th edition. His textbook Entrepreneurship - Thorie, Empirie, Politik ('Entrepreneurship - Theory, Empirics, Policy') with Matthias Menter and Michael Wyrwich is in the 4th edition.

Books (selection):

- Entrepreneurship – Theorie, Empirie, Politik (‚Entrepreneurship – Theory, Empirics, Policy‘). Forth revised edition, Berlin/Heidelberg 2024: Springer (in German, Textbook) (with Matthias Menter and Michael Wyrwich). https://doi.org/10.1007/978-3-658-44742-7
- "Leapfrogging and Plunging in Regional Entrepreneurship Performance in the United States, with European Comparisons". Paris 2023: OECD publishing. (with Jonathan Potter, Haifeng Qian, David J. Storey and Georgios Fotopoulos). https://dx.doi.org/10.1787/bc031b11-en
- The Geography of Entrepreneurial Psychology. Cheltenham 2021: Elgar (with Martin Obschonka and Michael Stuetzer). https://doi.org/10.4337/9781788973380
- Regional Trajectories of Entrepreneurship, Knowledge, and Growth - The Role of History and Culture. Cham 2019: Springer (with Michael Wyrwich). https://link.springer.com/book/10.1007%2F978-3-319-97782-9
- Marktversagen und Wirtschaftspolitik: Mikroökonomische Grundlagen staatlichen Handelns (‘Mikroökonomische Grundlagen staatlichen Handelns“ (‚Market Failure and Economic Policy – Microeconomic Foundations of Economic Policy‘). 10th revised and complemented edition, Munich 2018: Franz Vahlen (in German, Textbook). https://doi.org/10.15358/9783800656448

Journal articles (selection):

- Is innovation (increasingly) concentrated in large cities? An international comparison. Research Policy, 50 (2021), 104237 (with Michael Wyrwich). https://doi.org/10.1016/j.respol.2021.104237
- The Effect of Entrepreneurship for Economic Development—An empirical analysis using regional entrepreneurship culture. Journal of Economic Geography, 17 (2017), 157-189 (with Michael Wyrwich). https://doi.org/10.1093/jeg/lbv049
- The Long Persistence of Regional Levels of Entrepreneurship: Germany 1925 to 2005. Regional Studies, 48 (2014), 955-973 (with Michael Wyrwich). https://doi.org/10.1080/00343404.2013.816414
- The Phantom of the Opera: Cultural Amenities, Human Capital, and Regional Economic Growth. Labour Economics, 18 (2011), 755-766 (with Oliver Falck and Stephan Heblich). https://doi.org/10.1016/j.labeco.2011.06.004
- Effects of new business formation on regional development over time. Regional Studies, 38 (2004), 961-975 (with Pamela Mueller). https://doi.org/10.1080/0034340042000280965

Edited books and special issues of academic journals (selection):

- Ökonomische Geographie (Economic Geography). 2nd completely revised edition, Munich 2020: Vahlen(with Johannes Broecker, in German, Textbook).
- Special Issue “Entrepreneurship in a Regional Context”, Regional Studies, Vol. 48 (2014), No. 6 (with David J. Storey).
- Special Issue “The Effects of New Businesses on Economic Development”, Small Business Economics, Vol. 30 (2008), No. 1.
- Entrepreneurship in the region, New York 2006: Springer (with Jürgen Schmude).
- Special Issue “Regionalization of Innovation Policy”, Research Policy, Vol. 34 (2005), No. 8 (with Andreas Stephan).

For the complete list of publications see the personal website of Michael Fritsch https://m-fritsch.de/publications/
