= Bernie Fritsch =

Australian rules footballer

Personal information
- Full name: Bernard Joseph Fritsch
- Born: 17 February 1881; Hawthorn, Victoria
- Died: 22 October 1951 (aged 70); St Kilda, Victoria
- Original team: Hawthorn District Juniors

Playing career^{1}
Years	Club	Games (Goals)
1899	South Melbourne	1 (1)
- ^{1} Playing statistics correct to the end of 1899.

Bernard Joseph Fritsch (17 February 1881 – 22 October 1951) was an Australian rules footballer who played for the South Melbourne Football Club in the Victorian Football League (VFL).
