= Solenorhynchus =

Solenorhynchus Temporal range: Early- Middle Eocene

Scientific classification
- Kingdom: Animalia
- Phylum: Chordata
- Class: Actinopterygii
- Division: Teleostei
- Order: Gasterosteiformes
- Genus: †Solenorhynchus; Heckel 1853

Extinct genus of fishes

Solenorhynchus is an extinct genus of prehistoric bony fish that lived from the early to middle Eocene.

== See also ==
- Prehistoric fish
- List of prehistoric bony fish
