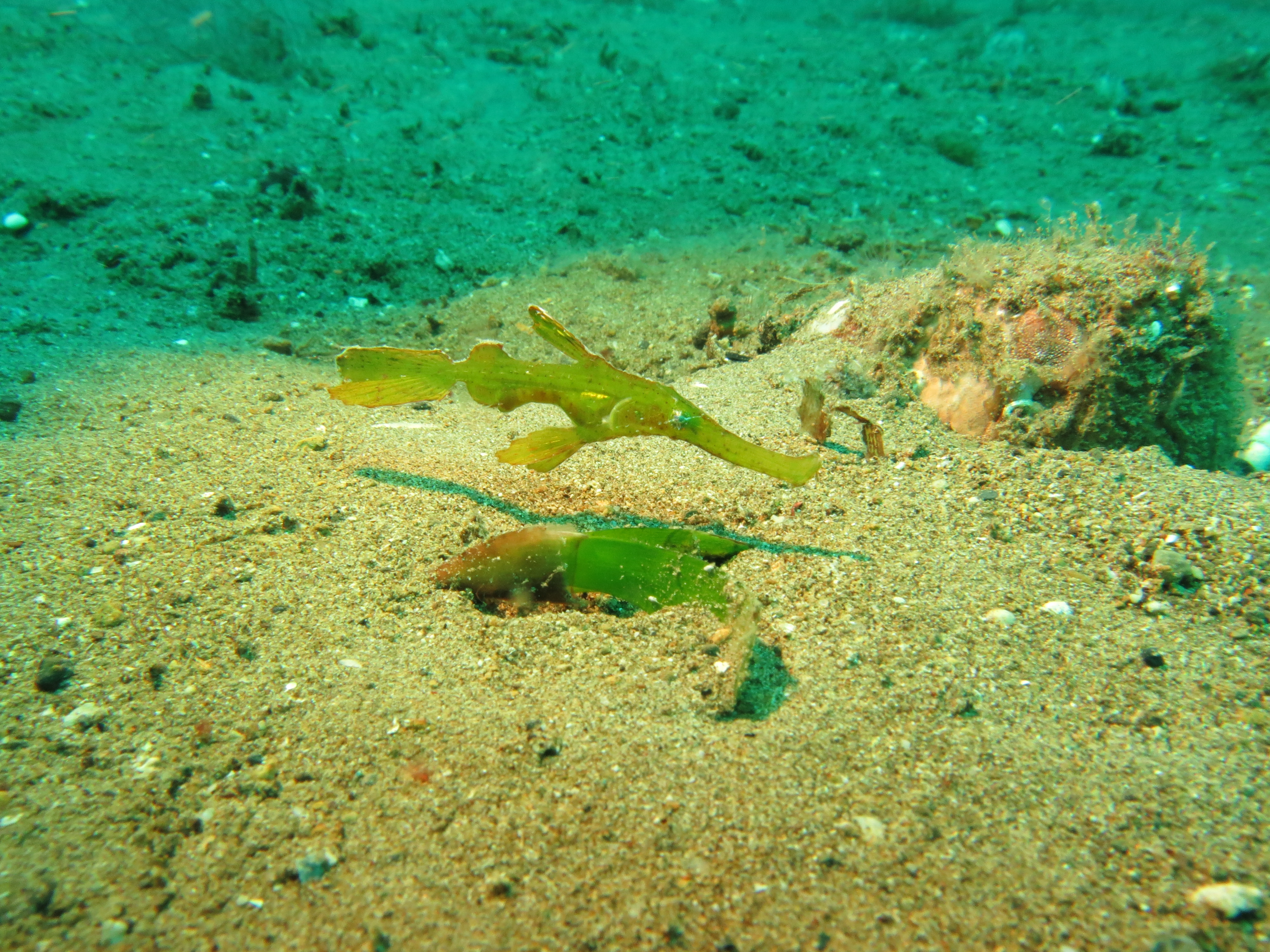

Conservation status
- Data Deficient (IUCN 3.1)

Scientific classification
- Kingdom: Animalia
- Phylum: Chordata
- Class: Actinopterygii
- Order: Syngnathiformes
- Family: Solenostomidae
- Genus: Solenostomus
- Species: S. halimeda

Binomial name
- Solenostomus halimeda J. W. Orr, Fritzsche & Randall, 2002

= Halimeda ghost pipefish =

Species of fish

The Halimeda ghost pipefish, Solenostomus halimeda, is a species of false pipefishes belonging to the family Solenostomidae.

== Description ==
Solenostomus halimeda can reach a length of 6.5 cm (2.6 in), and is the smallest of the ghost pipefishes. Its body is most often green, but can be red or any other color of the algae or coral in which it is hiding. This cryptic species looks very similar to the macroalga Halimeda. This uncommon species is related to pipefishes and seahorses. It can be distinguished by its large head that is about the same length as the rest of its body. The caudal fin is small and similar in form and size to the dorsal and pectoral fins.

== Behavior ==
These fish float nearly motionless, with their mouths facing downwards, around a background that makes them nearly impossible to see. They feed on tiny crustaceans, sucked inside through their long snouts. Unlike true pipefish, female Halimeda ghost pipefish carry their fertilised eggs between their pelvic fins, which are modified to form a brood pouch, until the eggs are ready to hatch.

== Distribution ==
This species lives in the Indian Ocean and in the Western Indo-Pacific, from the Maldives to the Marshall Islands.

== Habitat ==
The Halimeda ghost pipefish is reef-associated and lives at depths up to 23 m (75 ft).
