= Frič =

Frič (feminine: Fričová) is a Czech surname, derived from the German given name Friedrich. Notable people with the surname include:

- Alberto Vojtěch Frič (1882–1944), Czech botanist
- Antonín Frič (1832–1913), Czech paleontologist and biologist
- Jaroslav Erik Frič (1949–2019), Czech poet
- Josef Václav Frič (1829–1890), Czech poet and journalist
- Martin Frič (1902–1968), Czech film director, screenwriter and actor
- Václav Frič (1839–1916), Czech naturalist

== See also ==
- Fričovce
