= John Fritsche Sr. =

American ice hockey player (born 1966)

John Fritsche
- Born: March 5, 1966 (age 59) Cleveland, Ohio, U.S.
- Height: 5 ft 11 in (180 cm)
- Weight: 196 lb (89 kg; 14 st 0 lb)
- Position: Right wing
- Shot: Right
- Played for: AHL; Moncton Hawks; NLA; EV Zug; HC Lugano; HC Ambrì-Piotta
- National team: United States
- Playing career: 1985–2003

John Fritsche Sr. (born March 5, 1966) is an American former professional ice hockey player. He played with the United States men's national ice hockey team at the 1990 Men's World Ice Hockey Championships.

== Career statistics ==
			Regular season					Playoffs
Season	Team	League	GP	G	A	Pts	PIM	GP	G	A	Pts	PIM
1983–84	HC Ambrì-Piotta U20	Elite Jr. A	—	—	—	—	—	—	—	—	—	—
1983–84	HC Ambrì-Piotta	NLB	—	—	—	—	—	—	—	—	—	—
1984–85	HC Ambrì-Piotta	NLB	40	27	24	51	—	—	—	—	—	—
1985–86	HC Ambrì-Piotta	NLA	24	5	8	13	26	—	—	—	—	—
1986–87	EV Zug	NLB	36	29	20	49	48	5	5	5	10	8
1987–88	EV Zug	NLA	33	15	9	24	83	—	—	—	—	—
1988–89	EV Zug	NLA	36	30	26	56	47	2	3	1	4	6
1989–90	EV Zug	NLA	34	21	24	45	45	2	1	1	2	0
1990–91	EV Zug	NLA	33	19	11	30	38	—	—	—	—	—
1991–92	HC Lugano	NLA	30	9	8	17	47	4	3	2	5	6
1992–93	HC Lugano	NLA	33	6	13	19	38	4	1	2	3	14
1993–94	Moncton Hawks	AHL	11	2	5	7	16	—	—	—	—	—
1994–95	HC Ambrì-Piotta	NLA	20	5	14	19	18	3	0	2	2	2
1995–96	HC Ambrì-Piotta	NLA	34	15	15	30	20	7	1	4	5	4
1996–97	HC Ambrì-Piotta	NLA	36	5	9	14	79	—	—	—	—	—
1997–98	HC Ambrì-Piotta	NLA	39	11	11	22	47	9	6	4	10	2
1998–99	HC Ambrì-Piotta	NLA	14	3	1	4	37	15	3	3	6	6
1999–00	HC Ambrì-Piotta	NLA	42	21	11	32	57	9	3	2	5	8
2000–01	HC Ambrì-Piotta	NLA	37	8	9	17	42	—	—	—	—	—
2001–02	HC Ambrì-Piotta	NLA	41	7	11	18	16	6	1	3	4	0
2002–03	HC Ambrì-Piotta	NLA	23	2	5	7	29	—	—	—	—	—
AHL totals			11	2	5	7	16	—	—	—	—	—
NLA totals			509	182	185	367	669	61	22	24	46	48
