= 1968 in architecture =

The year 1968 in architecture involved some significant architectural events and new buildings.

== Events ==
- May 16 – Ronan Point tower block in London collapses after a gas explosion, killing four occupants.
- August 6 – The first steel columns for the World Trade Center in New York City are put into place by Karl Koch Erecting, at what will become the southwest corner of One World Trade Center (North Tower)

== Buildings and structures ==
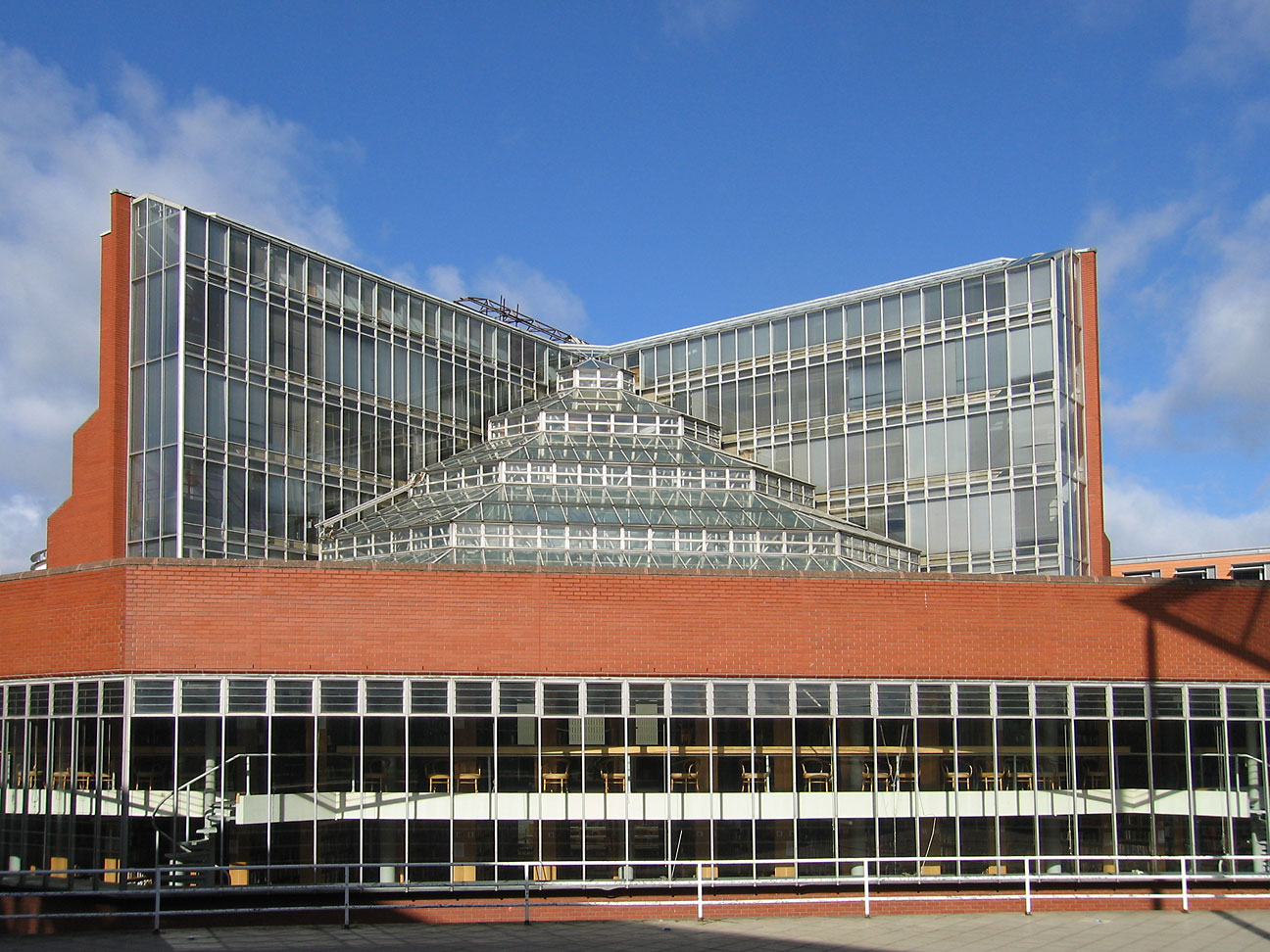
James Stirling's History Faculty, University of Cambridge, England

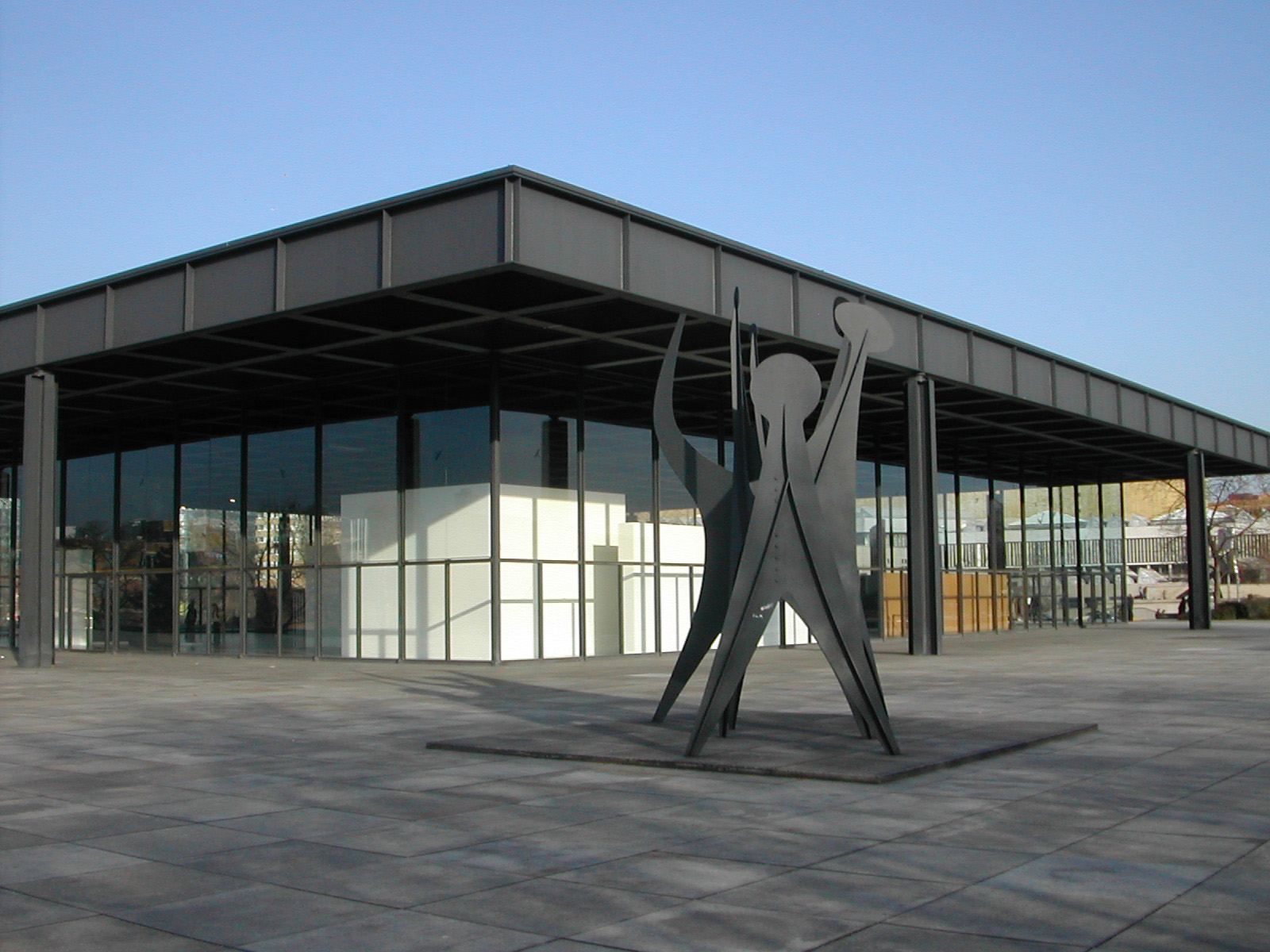
Mies van der Rohe's Neue Nationalgalerie, West Berlin

- The Calgary Tower in Calgary, Alberta, Canada, is opened.
- Marina City complex in Chicago, designed by Bertrand Goldberg, is completed.
- Lake Point Tower in Chicago, designed by Schippereit-Heinrich Associates, is completed.
- The Heinrich Hertz Tower in Hamburg, West Germany, is completed.
- The National Gallery of Victoria in Melbourne, Australia, designed by Sir Roy Grounds, is completed.
- The Neue Nationalgalerie in West Berlin, Germany, designed by Mies van der Rohe, is opened.
- The Nozema Tower Wormer in Wormerland, Netherlands is completed.
- The Olympiaturm in Munich, West Germany is opened.
- The Tower of the Americas in San Antonio, Texas is completed.
- The Standard Bank Centre in Johannesburg, South Africa is completed.
- The University of East Anglia in Norwich, England, main buildings designed by Denys Lasdun, are completed.
- The History Faculty of the University of Cambridge, England, designed by James Stirling, is completed.
- Christ Church Picture Gallery in Oxford, England, designed by Powell and Moya, is opened.
- Aalto Center in Seinäjoki, Finland, designed by Alvar Aalto, is completed.
- New building for the São Paulo Museum of Art (MASP) in Brazil, designed by Lina Bo Bardi, is inaugurated.
- Saint Mark's Coptic Orthodox Cathedral in Cairo, Egypt, is consecrated.
- Maria, Königin des Friedens church, Velbert-Neviges, West Germany, designed by Gottfried Böhm, is consecrated.
- The Christi Auferstehung church in Lindenthal, Cologne, West Germany, designed by Gottfried Böhm, is built.
- Church, St. Benedictusberg Abbey, Mamelis, Vaals, Netherlands, designed by Dom Hans van der Laan, is completed.
- Roman Catholic church of St Joseph, Leicester, England, designed by T. E. Wilson, is completed.
- Pacific Coliseum in Vancouver, designed by W. K. Noppe, is opened.
- One Kemble Street (offices) in London, designed by George Marsh of Richard Seifert's practice, is completed.
- Cables Wynd House ("Banana Flats"), Leith, Scotland, designed by Alison & Hutchison & Partners (Robert Forbes Hutchison, senior partner; Walter Scott, partner in charge), is completed.

== Awards ==
- American Academy of Arts and Letters Gold Medal – Buckminster Fuller
- AIA Gold Medal – Marcel Breuer
- Architecture Firm Award – I.M. Pei & Partners
- RAIA Gold Medal – Roy Grounds
- RIBA Royal Gold Medal – Richard Buckminster Fuller

== Births ==
- August 19 – Bernard Khoury, Lebanese architect
- October 16 – Olajumoke Adenowo, Nigerian architect
- Daniel Maggs, South African architect and artist

== Deaths ==
- April 29 – Oliver Hill, English architect (b. 1887)
- July 27 – Otto Eisler, Czech architect (b. 1893)
