= St Giles Circus =

Road junction in London, United Kingdom

Coordinates: 51°30′59″N 0°07′50″W

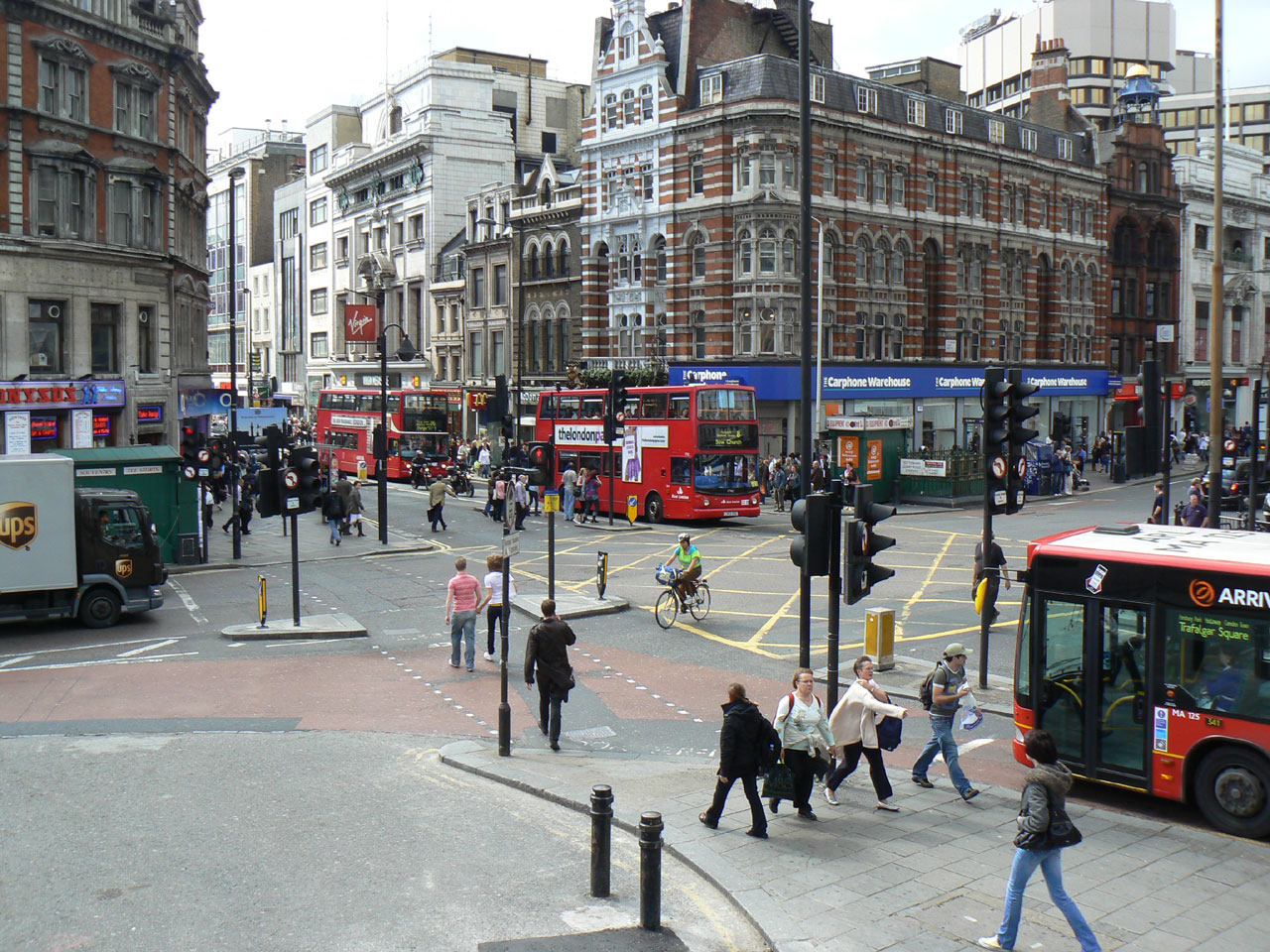
St Giles Circus seen from Centre Point prior to the start of Crossrail work, May 2007

St Giles Circus is a road junction in the St Giles district of the West End of London at the eastern end of Oxford Street, where it connects with New Oxford Street, Charing Cross Road and Tottenham Court Road, which it is more often referred to owing to the location of Tottenham Court Road Underground station directly under the junction. It is near to Soho, Covent Garden, Bloomsbury and Fitzrovia.

== Formation ==
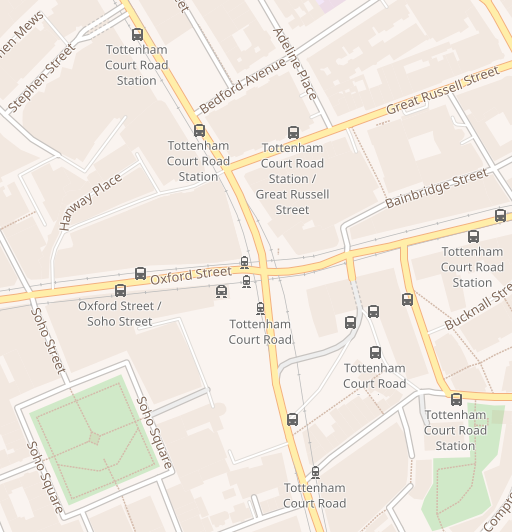
A map of St Giles Circus and the surrounding area

The circus derives its name from the nearby church of St Giles-in-the-Fields, after which the area is named. From the Middle Ages until the fifteenth century, gallows were located at St Giles Circus alongside a cage for prisoners, and a cattle enclosure known as St Giles's Pound. The area was an infamous rookery until it was cleared in the mid-19th century with the creation of New Oxford Street parallel to St Giles High Street by clearances.

Tottenham Court Road Underground station was opened in July 1900 as part of the Central London Railway, with the platforms under Oxford Street to the west of St Giles Circus, and the station opening on the south west side of the circus, on Oxford Street. The Charing Cross, Euston and Hampstead Railway joined the station with what is now part of the Northern Line in September 1908, with station entrance on the south east side of the circus. The main station ticket hall was later moved underground, built below the circus in the 1920s. The junction became known as St Giles Circus in 1921.

== Modern development ==
The area today is dominated by Centre Point Tower, located on the south-east corner on New Oxford Street and Charing Cross Road. Built between 1963 and 1966 by developer Harry Hyams, the brutalist tower was London's first "skyscraper", and is now a Grade II listed building.

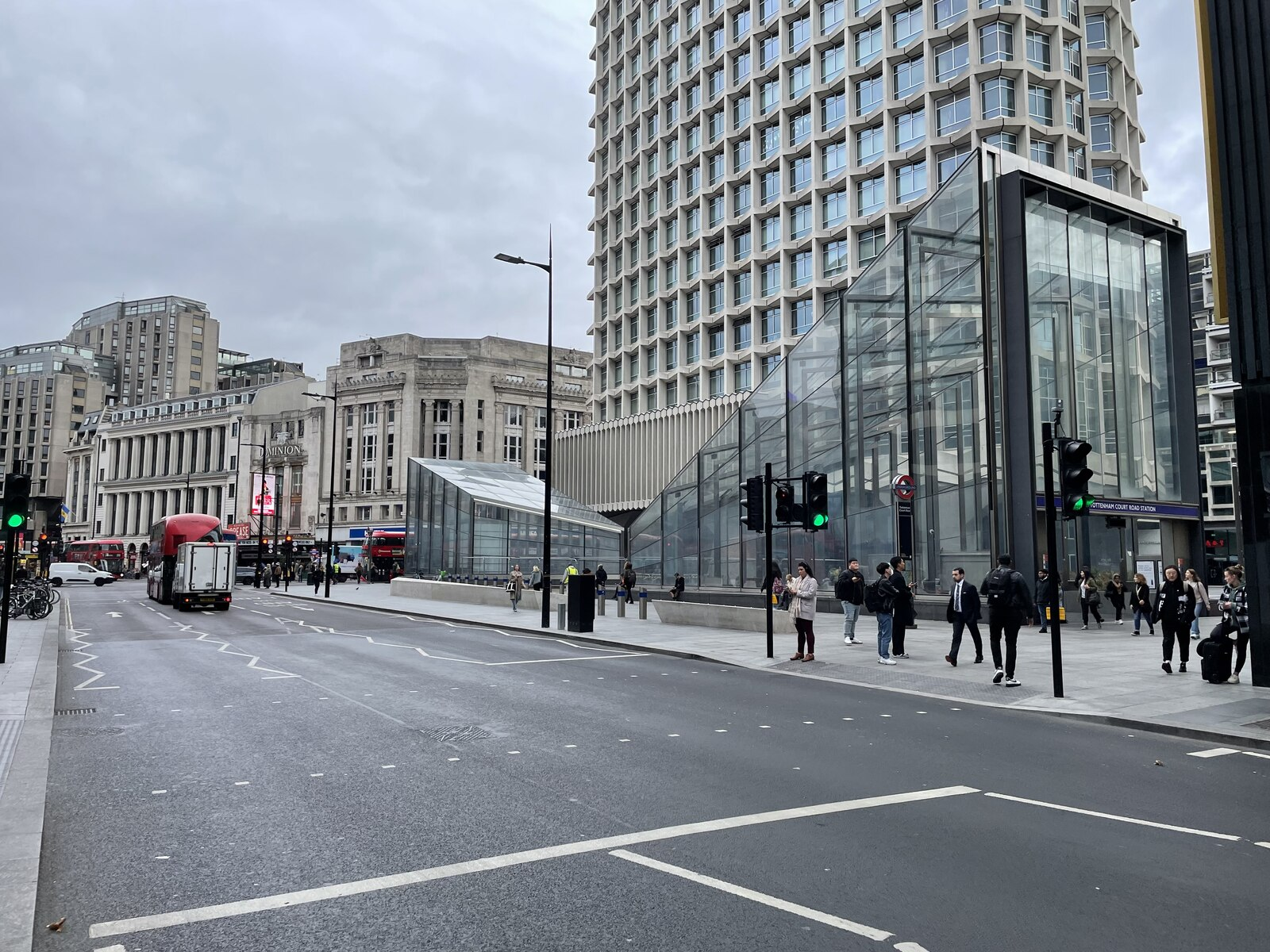
Tottenham Court Road station at St Giles Circus

In 2009, St Giles Circus became the site of construction for Crossrail, which disrupted road flows and led to several buildings being demolished.

The Dominion Theatre is close to the north-east corner, on Tottenham Court Road just above New Oxford Street. The London Astoria theatre was on the south west side. A new theatre to replace the Astoria, @sohoplace, opened in October 2022, the first new West End theatre in half a century. An auditorium/gallery is planned for the south-east corner.
