= Maggs =

Maggs is a surname. Notable people with the surname include:

- Adriana Maggs, Canadian actress
- Albert H. Maggs (1916–1994), Australian bookmaker
- Arnaud Maggs (1926–2012), Canadian artist
- Bruce Maggs, American computer scientist
- Christine Maggs (born 1956), British phycologist
- Colin G. Maggs, English railway historian
- Daniel Maggs (born 1968), South African architect and artist
- Darryl Maggs (born 1949), Canadian ice hockey player
- Dirk Maggs (born 1955), English radio producer
- Don Maggs (born 1961), American football player
- Ellen Maggs (born 1983), English football player
- Gregory E. Maggs (born 1964), American judge and lawyer
- Jeremy Maggs (born 1961), South African television presenter
- Joey Maggs (1969–2006), American wrestler
- John Maggs (1819–1896), English painter
- Kevin Maggs (born 1974), Irish rugby union player
- Randall Maggs, Canadian poet
- Sam Maggs (born 1988), Canadian-American author
- Tony Maggs (1937–2009), South African racing driver
- Uriah Maggs (1828–1913), English antiquarian bookseller

== See also ==
- Albert H. Maggs Composition Award, an Australian classical music award
- Maggs Bros Ltd, a British antiquarian bookseller
- Jack Maggs, a 1997 novel by Peter Carey
- Magg
