= Tolworth =

Area of Surbiton, London, England

Coordinates: 51.38°N 0.28°W

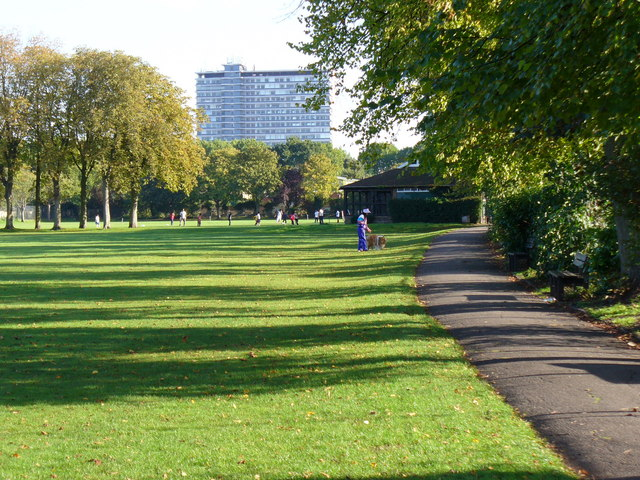
- Alexandra Recreation Ground, with the Tolworth Tower in the distance

- Location within Greater London
- Population: 9,833 (From 2016)
- OS grid reference: TQ197659
- London borough: Kingston
- Ceremonial county: Greater London
- Region: London
- Country: England
- Sovereign state: United Kingdom
- Post town: SURBITON
- Postcode district: KT5, KT6
- Dialling code: 020
- Police: Metropolitan
- Fire: London
- Ambulance: London
- UK Parliament: Kingston & Surbiton
- London Assembly: South West

Tolworth is a suburban area in the Surbiton district, Royal Borough of Kingston upon Thames, Greater London. It is 11 miles (17.7 km) southwest of Charing Cross. Neighbouring places include Berrylands, Chessington, Epsom, Ewell, Kingston, Long Ditton, New Malden, Surbiton and Worcester Park. Surbiton is the nearest, about a mile to the northwest. Tolworth is divided in two by the A3 Kingston Bypass and is situated slightly north of the Greater London-Surrey border.

== History ==
Tolworth, in the Domesday Book, was called Taleorde. Its Domesday assets were held partly by Picot from Richard de Tonebrige and partly by Radulf (Ralph) from the Bishop of Bayeux. It rendered: 2 1/2 hides; also 4 hides with Long Ditton; 1 mill without dues, 8 ploughs, 10 1/2 acres and 1/2 rod of meadow. It rendered £6.

The Evelyn family, who had settled in Surrey, played a prominent role and established gunpowder mills at Tolworth, probably in 1561.

In John Marius Wilson's Imperial Gazetteer of England and Wales (1870–72) Tolworth was described:

"TALWORTH, a hamlet in Long Ditton parish, Surrey; 2½ miles SSE of Kingston upon Thames. Acres, 1,190. Pop., 434. Houses, 81. An ancient manor-house here was held by the Earl of Kent, uncle of Edward III.; and is now a farmhouse."

For much of the 19th century, the Earls of Egmont were Tolworth's principal landowners.

By 1908 things were changing: the population growth was accelerating due to the development of the brickfields and the construction of Tolworth Sewage Farm (which opened in 1891), both in Red Lion Lane (now Red Lion Road). With a proper sewerage system Tolworth was ready for development. St Matthew's Church had been built for a congregation of 800 and trams now ran from the Red Lion.

In 1919 the Medical Officer of Health reported that Surbiton was a residential neighbourhood with no dominating factories or works. The only new feature of late, he said, is the springing up of a few "motor garages," each employing a few hands on the care and repair of cars. He advised that the Electric Light Works and a belated resuscitation of the Tolworth Brickfields represented the leading "works" in Surbiton. The reference to the brickworks probably relates to it being owned by William Alen until his bankruptcy in 1881. Surbiton Urban District Council entered into an agreement with Callenders Cables & Construction (later to become British Insulated Callender's Cables) under which the company laid electrical supply cables around Surbiton. In 1916 the council sold the Surbiton and District Electricity Co, based in Hollyfield Road, to Callenders. The opening of the Kingston bypass (A3 road) in 1927 was a major catalyst for expansion which included 6.5 miles (10.5 km) of new residential roads, containing 2,000 houses. This period also saw the construction of Tolworth Broadway, aligning with the Kingston Road, on the former Tolworth Lodge Farm.

In the 1930s and 1940s the clay extraction requirements of a brickworks north of the A3, off Red Lion Road (now Red Lion Industrial Park), produced a large water-filled pit (known locally as "The Bluey") which was used as a landfill site for bomb-damage and industrial material removed from bomb-sites resulting from the Blitz. The Civil Defence Corps used to have a training site with a full-size mock-up of a bomb-damaged housing estate. This land has been reclaimed and is now a recreation ground. The Tolworth Brickworks Company Ltd. decided in September 1946 that the company should be voluntarily wound up – a process that continued until at least 1951. Clay extraction also took place at "The Wood" near Surbiton Station, Fishponds Park. as well as in Claygate

Off Worcester Park Road/Old Malden Lane was the access to Tolworth Hall and nearby, along the Hogsmill River, were watercress beds.

Until 1965 Tolworth, as a part of Surbiton, was in the county of Surrey.

=== Station Estate ===
Plans for the Station Estate were approved by Surbiton Corporation and Surrey County Council in January 1940, comprising 459 houses and 10 shops on four sites, separated by the Kingston Road and the Southern Railway Chessington Branch Line (which was to be extended to Leatherhead).

As part of the agreement the owners gave up part of the land to form the wider and re-aligned Kingston Road. Dean Court and Drayton Court were constructed in 1959 on part of the "Station Estate" land and the Developer "Lansdowne Court Investments" is acknowledged in the naming of Lansdowne Close. Earlier plans had envisaged six semi detached and one detached house between the Toby Jug and Tolworth Station.

=== Wartime bomb damage ===
During World War II a number of V1 flying bombs fell on Surbiton and Tolworth, including the notorious "Derby Day Disaster" of June 1944 when 12 people were killed by a V1 at Tolworth Park Road. Between 7 October 1940 and 6 June 1941, 25 high explosive bombs were dropped on the current Tolworth and Hook Rise ward but there were as many again in the few adjacent streets around Douglas Road which is now part of Surbiton Hill ward.

=== Ace of Spades ===
A short distance away is the Ace of Spades (junction) at Hook, named after the famous "Ace of Spades Roadhouse" which became a popular venue following the opening of the Kingston bypass in 1927 by the Minister of Transport, Stanley Baldwin. This was described as a pioneer roadhouse, with meals served at any time in a restaurant with seating for 700 to 800, dancing until 3 am, a swimming pool, miniature golf course, polo ground, riding school, and an airstrip. The pub was burnt down in the 1950s.

=== Historic bus stop ===
Until 2011, the green at the junction of Ewell Road, Red Lion Road and King Charles Road opposite the former Red Lion Public house was the site of an extremely rare double fronted wooden bus stop, located at the former Tolworth turning point of the 603 trolleybus service, which ceased in May 1962. (It was previously served by trams between 1906 and 1931.) The shelter was removed after Transport for London decided that it was the only bus stop they were not prepared to maintain, on the basis that it was wooden.

=== Musical heritage ===
David Bowie launched his Ziggy Stardust stage show with the Spiders from Mars at the Toby Jug pub in Tolworth, on 10 February 1972. Other bands to play there included Led Zeppelin, Fleetwood Mac, The Yardbirds, John Lee Hooker, Black Sabbath, King Crimson, Blodwyn Pig, John Mayall & the Bluesbreakers, Free, Jethro Tull, Taste, Family, Chicken Shack, Genesis and Ten Years After. The Toby Jug pub was demolished in the year 2000, becoming part of the controversial Tesco site (detailed later in this article). It is reported that there was a Maestrovox electronic organ attached to the piano in the pub dining room and dance hall. The pub is remembered by the naming of the adjacent Toby Way.

During the 1980s gigs were occasionally held at Tolworth Recreation Centre including, on 12 March 1983, one by New Order.

=== Tesco-owned former green fields ===
An 11 acres (4.5 ha) site bounded by the railway line serving Tolworth to the east, the A240 to the north and Hook Rise South & the A3 road to the West. Plans were drawn up in the 1930s for the site to be used for circa 130 family homes in a similar style to much of Tolworth – this was part of a larger development to be known as the "Station Estate".

As part of the war effort, the land was taken over by the Ministry of Works and developed from green fields in the 1940s. It became an extensive but discreet development of low single-story brick building covering the majority of the site. It remained in government hands for a variety of uses from the MAFF and Ministry of Defence to the Directorate of Overseas Surveys; in its heyday it was reported to have employed over 1,000 people. It was finally vacated by the last 370 MAFF staff in October 1998 in preparation for sale.

Tesco purchased the site by private treaty in 2002, avoiding any offer for sale on the open market. In 2000 the vacant possession value of the site was recorded in Hansard at £9.6 million. A number of surrounding buildings were purchased by Chinacorp, a developer working with Tesco.

The site is zoned by the local authority, Kingston Council, for residential and community use. The site has been subject to a number of planning applications for the construction of a retail store of up to 89,000 square feet (8,300 m^{2}) and up to 660 dwellings in buildings up to 12 storeys high.

In 2015 Tesco sold the site to developer Meyer Homes, who were given permission from the Planning Inspectorate in July 2019 for a 950-home development (including a new nursery, doctor's surgery and police building).

== Description ==
Architecturally, Tolworth consists mainly of low-density 1930s semi-detached properties, and small to medium commercial and retail developments. There is a concentration of industrial activity in an area bounded on the north by A3 London-to-Portsmouth trunk route, which runs through the area. The access junction for the A3, linking it on the north with the Broadway and on the south with the A240 Kingston Road toward Epsom, is known as the Toby Jug Roundabout, named after the public house which stood beside it until it was closed and demolished in 2002 under the ownership of Tesco and its partners. The area is also served by a branch railway line running from London Waterloo to Chessington South two stops to the south, with services run by South Western Railway.

== Governance ==
On 1 April 1895 Tolworth became a civil parish, being formed from part of Long Ditton, on 1 April 1965 the parish was abolished. At the 1951 census (one of the last before the abolition of the parish), Tolworth had a population of 18,253.

== Facilities ==
The principal shopping centre is situated west of the A3 in Tolworth Broadway, with the landmark Tolworth Tower, at its junction with the A3. Tolworth Tower, built on the site of the former Tolworth Odeon Cinema is an office block designed by George Marsh of R. Seifert and Partners and opened in 1963.

The offices and studios of 107.8 Radio Jackie, a commercial radio station broadcasting to south-west London and north Surrey, can be found on the Broadway in what had been the Crown Post Office. The broadcast mast is sited, with many other antennas, atop Tolworth Tower.

=== Tolworth Greenway ===
The Tolworth Greenway was a public space planning scheme, the Mayor's "Great Outdoors" initiative. The barrier on the central reservation was removed, which itself has been widened. The stripey green "sureset" resin surface allows users to walk the length of Tolworth Broadway on the Greenway and to cross the Kingston Bypass (A3) at street level. The scheme aimed to revitalise Tolworth Broadway, improve safety and reduce traffic speeds. Critics believed that the area would be more dangerous, as pedestrians would cross the road wherever they chose.

=== Tolworth Court Farm ===
This historic farm site dates back to Norman times. Tolworth Court Farm Fields is now a Local Nature Reserve, and consists of a system of fields and hedgerows. Previously owned by the London Borough of Lambeth, it was purchased by the Royal Borough of Kingston in the 1980s. There is access from Kingston Road (A240) near Jubilee Way.

=== Community centre ===
Tolworth is the home of the arts centre: The CornerHOUSE (Previously known as the Douglas Centre).

=== Police stations ===
Surbiton Police station was opened in 1888 on the site of the previous Toll House on the corner of Ditton Road/Ellerton Road and Ewell Road. The red brick building was demolished many years ago but the site continued with police related use as a car compound and with staff operating from temporary cabins. The site was developed into Watton Point flats by CNM Estates. The Police station moved to the former St Matthew's School building on the other side of the Ewell Road in 1977 where there was vehicle parking. It was also near the Metropolitan Police Garage in Hollyfield Road acquired in 1968 – formerly used by the Cooper Car Company. All have now been vacated by the Police. The building has been sympathetically restored to its previous educational use and is currently a venue for London Tutorial College, offering GCSE and A level programmes as well as language courses for domestic and international students. The Neighbourhood Office in Millbank House, Surbiton, which opened in 2011 has also now closed.

=== Tolworth Hospital ===
Tolworth Hospital originally built as an isolation Hospital provides services for South West London and St George's Mental Health NHS Trust. The Trust provides mental health and social care service to the residents of Kingston, Richmond, Merton, Sutton and Wandsworth boroughs, as well as a number of specialist regional and national services.

=== Churches ===
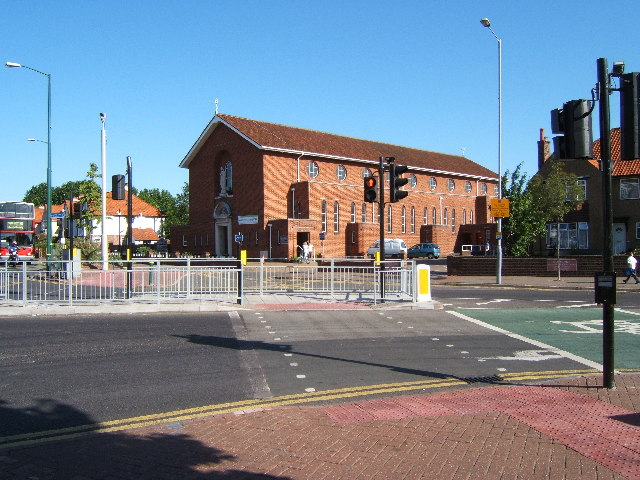
Church of Our Lady Immaculate

Tolworth has two parish churches; an Anglican one in Hamilton Avenue, dedicated to Saint George, which was built in 1934 and not given its own parish until 2015; and a Roman Catholic one in Ewell Road, dedicated to Our Lady Immaculate, which was completed in 1958 and consecrated in 1963, replacing an earlier 1930s chapel. There is also a United Reformed Church in Elgar Avenue.

=== Development ===
CNM Estates obtained planning permission in 2013 for a 142-bed hotel, conferencing facility and associated parking close to Tolworth railway station.

== Economy ==
=== Industry ===
Apart from the MoD and DOS sites on the south side of the A3, Gala Cosmetics had a large production facility (at the start of Oakcroft Road) as did Andre Rubber Co (who specialised in bonding rubber to metal and made components for cars, docks, armoured fighting vehicles, hospitals, warships and diving helmets) – now the site of the Hook Rise South Industrial Park. Founded by Theodore Bernard Andre they boasted of having three acres of specialised rubber technology.

Prior to the construction of Sundial Court there was a camping goods supplier – the previous building having been partially demolished due to road widening. Siebe Gorman a company that developed diving and breathing equipment purchased 6 acres of land at Tolworth in 1938 – the new building was named Neptune Works, on Davis Road (off Cox Lane) and near to King George's Field – although this would probably be regarded as Chessington nowadays. Local businessman Eric Miller recalls a part-time job filling breathing masks with carbon granules at Siebe Gorman and also with the nearby J. Lyons and Co. bakery in Cox Lane.

==== Hillaldam and Galleon ====
Hillaldam Coburn (previously known as E. Hill Aldam and Co) a sliding door gear manufacturer operated from Earlsfield before moving to Brittanic Works, Red Lion Road, Tolworth in 1959 where they remained until 1989

They were a sister company of English Fireplaces (Wimbledon) Ltd set up by Ernest Hill Aldam, Kenneth Aldam and Donald Aldam using the Galleon Trade Mark. The company was established in May 1938 operating from Haslsemere Avenue, Earlsfield, SW18. In September 1953 the company resolved to purchase the former Brickworks in Tolworth as tenants in common with E Hill Aldam & Co for a cost of £30,000 being shared between the companies. (The Tolworth Brickworks Company Ltd. had opted to be voluntarily wound up – see above). English Fireplaces and Hillaldam then set about redeveloping the site demolishing existing buildings – there had previously been buildings with 5 chimneys on the site. In 1955 the company became English Fireplaces (Galleon) Ltd. and in 1979 became Galleon Claygate Ltd. Galleon now have showrooms in the Ewell Road. The leases of cottages at 220–236 Red Lion Road were purchased in 1961 and a number of properties fronting Red Lion Road were subsequently demolished to form car parking.

==== Radar ====
Decca Radar's Radar Research and Development laboratories moved to the Tolworth roundabout in the former Fox and Nicholl factory. Decca's standards department was located at 456 Ewell Road. Decca's well-resourced sports ground existed until recently as "Deckers" but has now become a 5-a-side football centre.

==== Motor industry ====
Fox and Nicholl were a pre-war Lagonda car specialist based adjacent to the Tolworth roundabout. HRG Engineering Company also known as HRG, was a British car manufacturer based in Oakcroft Road, (then Tolworth) which had been founded in 1936 by Major Edward Halford, Guy Robins and Henry Ronald Godfrey. They ceased trading in 1966 although production had finished 10 years earlier. Nearby at 243 Ewell Road and in Hollyfield Road was the Cooper Car Company founded in 1947 – according to an article by Phil Cooper in "The Good Life" newspaper during the 1950s, F1 cars were regularly driven along the Ewell Road by Cooper Car Company. Other motoring connections nearby included Jack Brabham whose workshop was in Chessington and AC Cars in Thames Ditton owned by (William) Derek Hurlock who lived in Long Ditton.

==== Aircraft and Armaments Manufacture ====
Fox and Nicholl moved to wartime aircraft industry production – handling large quantities of sheet metal work, sub-assemblies. LF Peatty and Southborough Sheet Metal also manufactured parts for the de Havilland Mosquito

Nash and Thompson was a British engineering firm established by Archibald Frazer-Nash and Henry Ronald Godfrey. (See also HRG). They were based in Oakcroft Road and specialised in the production of hydraulically operated gun turrets for aircraft. The company was also an important manufacturer of hydraulic powered radar scanners

United Insulator Co manufactured capacitors and were suppliers to the aircraft industry. They were based in Oakcroft Road.

=== Commerce ===
Tolworth Broadway has various shops, banks, cafes, an M&S supermarket, Tolworth Tower, a Travelodge hotel and 'Hollywood Bowl'. Also near Tolworth railway station there is a Goals Soccer Centre and a Carting track. Alexandra Park. Fishponds Park in Surbiton sits on the Tolworth border (Fishponds was a Georgian house built between 1740 and 1742, part of the estate of Sir Frederick Butler of the tobacco family, bought by Surbiton Urban District Council in 1935).

A chicken shop on Tolworth Broadway, Chicken King, gained recognition after the Chicken Connoisseur reviewed it on an episode of The Pengest Munch. It was rated a 4/5 overall and dubbed "fairly decent".

The Co-op (RACS), Woolworths, Victor Towler had 8 shops in the Broadway at their peak and Bryants along with others, including Beswicks, Bata, Edmund Goodrich, Hallewells, Beths and Veritys, had shops. There was a Blue Star garage and milk was delivered by Jobs Dairy from 432 Ewell Road – (the company was sold to Unigate in 1987). In Lenelby Road was the Royal Windsor Laundry employing 100 girls by 1920.

The headquarters of Lidl GB is located on Kingston Road near to Tolworth railway station. The five-storey, 250,000 square foot (23,000 m^{2}) building replaced the previous headquarters in Wimbledon.

=== Nearby attractions ===
Also nearby are Rose Theatre, Kingston, Chessington World of Adventures, Richmond Park, Sandown Park, Hampton Court, Mercedes-Benz World, Brooklands Museum, Kempton Park Racecourse, Kingstonian F.C., AFC Wimbledon, Harlequin F.C., Ham House, Horton Country Park, Royal Botanic Gardens, Kew, Bushy Park, and Morden Hall Park.

== Transport ==
=== National Rail ===
Tolworth railway station is served by South Western Railway services direct to London Waterloo (northbound) and Chessington South (southbound). Trains come to the station every half-hour from a little after 06:30 until 21:00 after which it is hourly until the last train a little after 23:00. Trains also stop at Raynes Park, Wimbledon, Clapham Junction and Vauxhall.

=== London Buses ===
Tolworth is served by London Buses routes 265, 281, 406, 418, K1 and K2.

=== Road ===
Standing on the A3 from London to Guildford, Tolworth has good connections to London and to the M25 motorway. Epsom town centre (which includes the Ashley Centre) is just 4 miles distant. Kingston town centre (which includes Marks & Spencer, John Lewis and the Bentall Centre) is just 2 miles distant. Surbiton town centre is just under 1 mile away.

== Sport and recreation ==
Tolworth has King George's Field, a memorial to King George V. Corinthian-Casuals F.C., a non-league football team, plays its home games at the playing fields, the site was formerly the home ground of Tolworth Football Club before it merged with Corinthian-Casuals in the late 1980s. Tolworth is also the home of amateur football teams Tolworth Athletic (who play in the Surrey South Eastern Combination League) and West London Blues.

Kingston University has a sports ground at Tolworth Court, Old Kingston Road.

Tolworth has a Scouting movement, and is today represented by 1st Tolworth Scouts.

A 32 lane bowling alley is situated near the Toby Jug roundabout: this was a joint venture between Excel Bowling and Bass Charrington. The original name "Excel Bowl" was changed in 1974, when Charrington & Co. took over Excel Bowling. This has now been renamed to Hollywood Bowl.

The 2012 and 2016 Irish Olympian Kieran Behan is a member of Tolworth Gymnastics Club, which is based in Fullers Way North.

== Politics ==
Tolworth is part of the Kingston and Surbiton constituency for elections to the House of Commons of the United Kingdom.

Tolworth is part of the Tolworth ward for elections to Kingston upon Thames London Borough Council.

== Notable residents ==
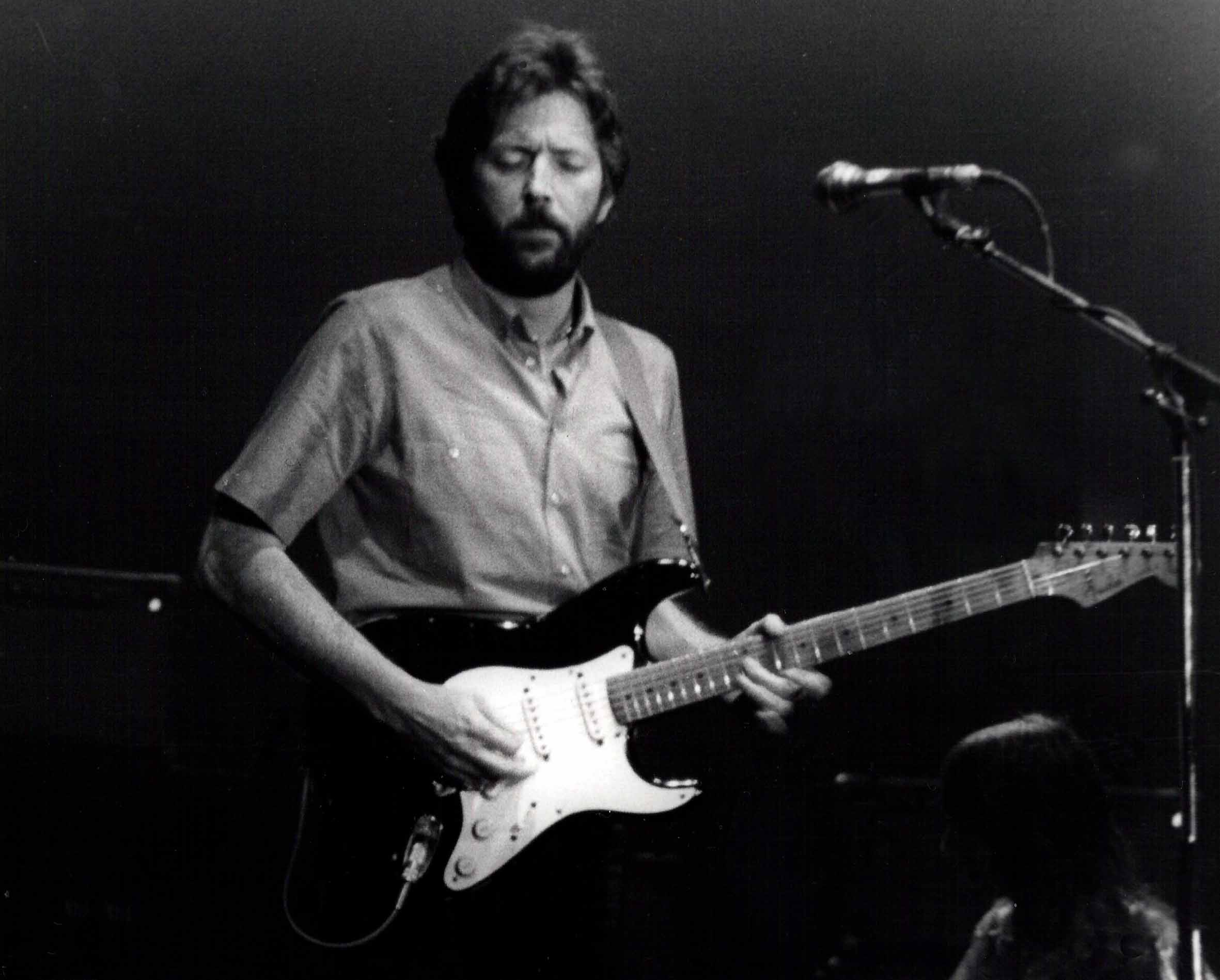
Rock guitarist Eric Clapton went to Hollyfield School.

- Muriel Box – Oscar winner and screenwriter, The Seventh Veil (1945), second wife of Lord Gardiner
- Jane Campbell, Baroness Campbell of Surbiton – British disability rights campaigner and a life peer in the House of Lords.
- Eric Clapton – musician, used to live in Tolworth, attending Hollyfield School
- Elvis Costello – musician, lived locally in the 1970s
- James Follett – science fiction author and screenwriter
- Allan Ganley – jazz musician
- David Hemmings – actor and director, lived on the Sunray Estate in the 1950s while attending Glyn Grammar School in Ewell
- Richard Jefferies – rural writer and journalist, moved to 2, Woodside Villas, (now No. 296), Ewell Road in 1877
- Debbie McGee – magician's assistant and radio presenter, attended Our Lady Immaculate School and Tolworth Girls School
- C. H. Middleton ("Mr Middleton") – radio and TV gardening show presenter, lived at 17, Princes Avenue, Tolworth
- Austin Partner – First Class passenger on RMS Titanic, stockbroker, lived at 352, Ewell Road; buried at St Mary's Church, Long Ditton
- Bob and Alf Pearson – musical performing duo moved from Sunderland to Tolworth when their father was working on the Tolworth by-pass
- Cesar Picton – coal merchant, former slave, moved to Tolworth in 1807.
- Alan Wheatley – actor, played the Sheriff of Nottingham in the TV series The Adventures of Robin Hood in the 1950s, was born in Tolworth. He was also the first person killed by a Dalek in an episode of Doctor Who in 1964.
- Leila Williams – TV presenter, one of the first on Blue Peter, ran the Royal Oak Public House in Ewell Road
