= 107.8 Radio Jackie =

Radio station in Kingston upon Thames, England

- Kingston upon Thames; England
- Broadcast area: South West London and North Surrey (parts of east Berkshire included)
- Frequency: 107.8 MHz

Programming
- Format: Adult contemporary

History
- First air date: 19 March 1969

Technical information
- Transmitter coordinates: 51.3801°N 0.2808°W

Links
- Website: www.radiojackie.com

Radio Jackie is an Independent Local Radio station in Kingston upon Thames, England broadcasting news, popular hits, and local information to South-West London and North Surrey from its studios in Tolworth.

== History ==
Radio Jackie began as a pirate station first broadcasting in March 1969. Jackie broadcast on the 1525 kHz frequency and soon became one of the most popular pirate stations in the country. It changed frequency several times, settling on 1332 kHz in 1978 when the new European frequency guidelines were implemented. From February 1971, it also broadcast on FM on 94.4 MHz every Saturday evening.

By the early 1980s, Radio Jackie had become a 24-hour-a-day local station with studios in Worcester Park and a shop in Morden. It employed full-time staff, was VAT-registered and had an entry in the phone directory—a very public operation for an illegal broadcaster. The station had huge public support with local borough councils and MPs supporting its wish to gain a licence. In 1972, a recording of the station was even played in the House of Commons at the committee stage of the Sound Broadcasting Bill, as an example of what local radio could sound like.

In the mid-1980s, however, new laws meant that the days of pirate stations were numbered, and as one of the highest-profile stations Radio Jackie was an early target. Despite huge local protests the station ceased broadcasting on 4 February 1985. At the time it was south west London's second most popular station.

== Licence ==
Ten years after their pirate radio closedown, in 1996, Tony Collis made efforts to bring the station back as a legal broadcaster when the South-West London licence was advertised. A detailed set of plans was produced with a lot of community content, but the Radio Authority (now Ofcom) awarded Thames the licence on 107.8 FM. Over the years Thames Radio, as it was later renamed, fell into financial difficulty, and in 2003, the Radio Authority gave the original chairman Tony Collis permission to make a bid for the station. He purchased Thames Radio and Radio Jackie was relaunched on 107.8 MHz on Sunday 19 October 2003. The first song played was The Cars – 'Heartbeat City' because the chorus contains the lyrics 'Oh Jacki what took you so long'. The first on air presenter was ex-Radio Atlantis presenter Dave Owen, who was the last presenter on Radio Jackie when the station closed down in 1985, with BBC Radio 2 DJ David Jacobs installed as chairperson.

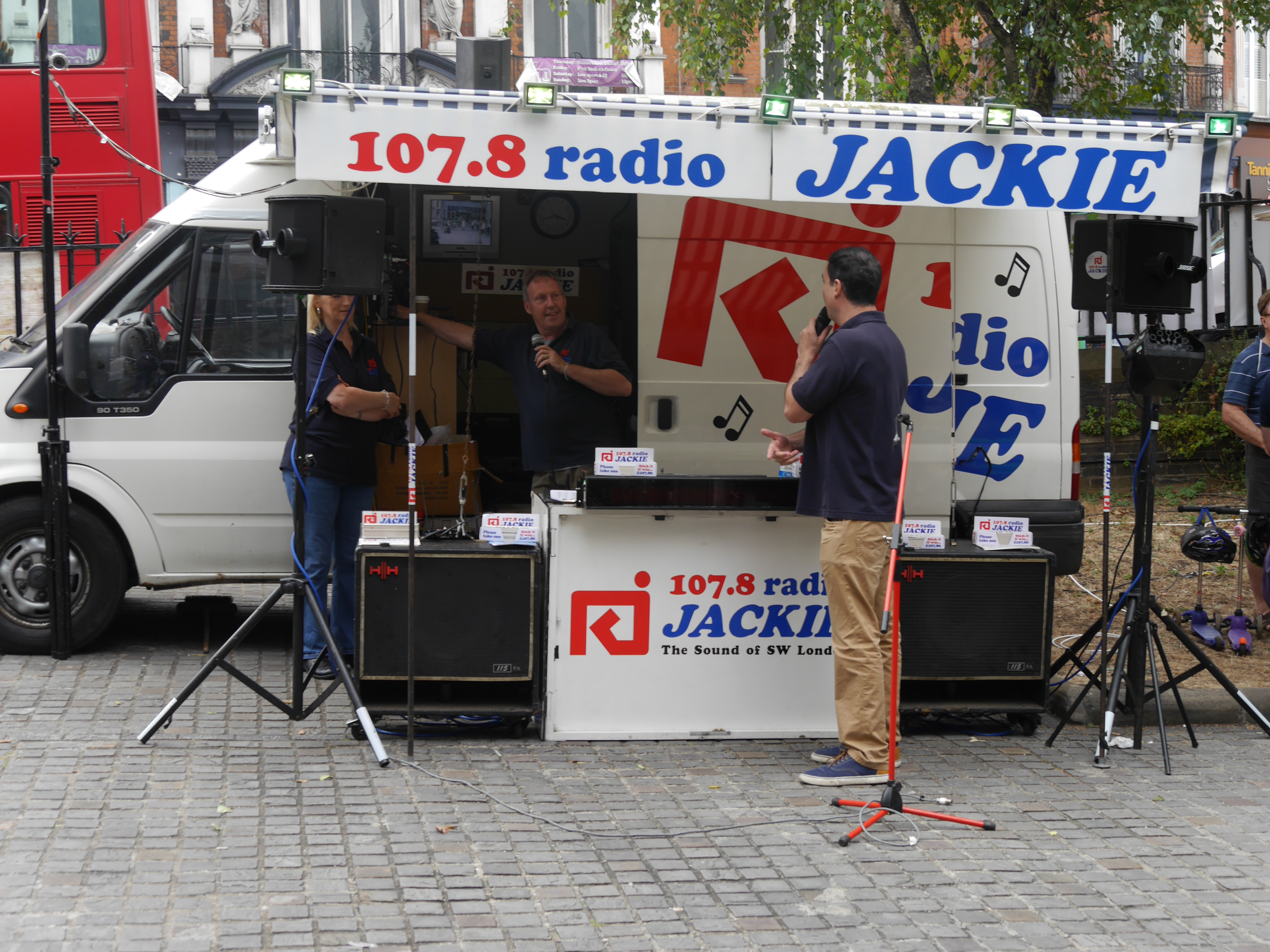
Radio Jackie, Putney, London, 2016

Radio Jackie transmits from the top of Tolworth Tower.

== Legacy ==
Radio Jackie celebrated 50 years since first broadcasting in March 1969.
