= Magg =

Magg is a surname of German origin. Notable people with the surname include:

- Alphons Magg (1891–1967), Swiss sculptor
- Alois Magg (1914–2001), German air force captain
- Fritz Magg (1914–1997), Austrian-American cellist
- Julius Magg (1884–1931), Austrian engineer and professor

== See also ==
- Movie Magg, 1955 song by Carl Perkins
- Chief Steward Magg, fictional character in the high fantasy novel series The Chronicles of Prydain
- Maggs
