= Gateway House, Manchester =

Building in Manchester, England

Coordinates: 53°28′42″N 2°13′55″W

Gateway House
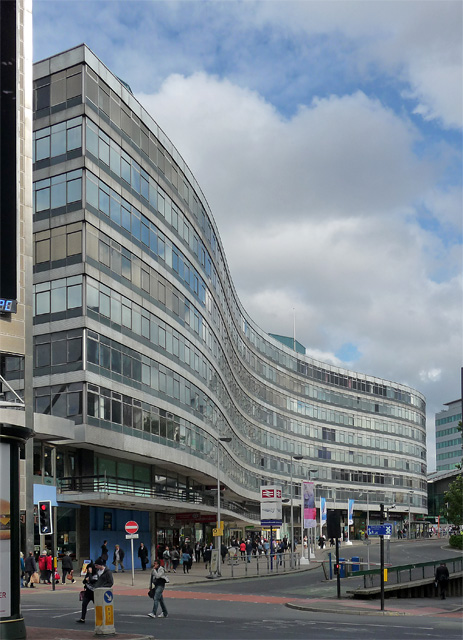
- Gateway House and Piccadilly Station approach pictured in 2011 before the 2017 refurbishment
- Alternative names: Piccadilly House

General information
- Architectural style: Modernist
- Location: Piccadilly, Manchester, England
- Current tenants: Staycity Hotel Apartments
- Completed: 1969
- Renovated: 2017
- Owner: Realty Estates

Height
- Height: 36 m (118 ft)

Technical details
- Floor count: 9
- Floor area: 12,861 m^{2} (138,430 sq ft)

Design and construction
- Architect: Richard Seifert

Gateway House in Manchester, England, is a modernist office block above a row of shops designed by Richard Seifert & Partners and completed in 1969. It replaced a row of 19th-century railway warehouses on the approach to Manchester Piccadilly station. The building, which differed from much of Seifert's contemporary work in that it departed from the bare concrete brutalist style which had become his trademark, was nicknamed the "lazy S" and was reputedly designed as a doodle.

== Reception ==
It is considered to be one of Siefert's most loveable buildings, commanding respect from Clare Hartwell, who described it as

a very impressive long, sweeping, undulating façade, the horizontals stressed throughout. One of the best office blocks in Manchester, its glittering serpentine shape well suited to the sloping site.

== Future ==
The building was bought by Realty Estates in 2008. Hodder + Partners won a competition to redevelop Gateway House in 2009. The plans are for the landmark structure to be converted into a hotel at a cost of £20 million. An office block with ground floor retail space on Ducie Street and a gym behind the Seifert building would be the second phase of the development. In December 2011, the £35 million redevelopment scheme by Hodder + Partners for Realty Estates, was given planning approval by Manchester City Council.

Despite planning approval, redevelopment has not started. In June 2014, the building was sold to international property group, LaSalle for £26 million. A new let was agreed with Waitrose and work could begin on renovating the building with a new hotel operator. Refurbishment commenced in October 2015 and was completed in early 2017.

A major redevelopment of the neighbouring Piccadilly Station and the surrounding area was proposed to complement the planned construction of the High Speed 2 (HS2) railway line to Manchester. The project would have involved the construction of a large new canopy over the HS2 platforms and the creation of a new entrance to the station. As part of the HS2 redevelopment plans it was likely that Gateway House would be demolished. The construction of HS2 to Manchester was cancelled in October 2023.
