= Tolworth Hospital =

- South West London and St George's Mental Health NHS Trust
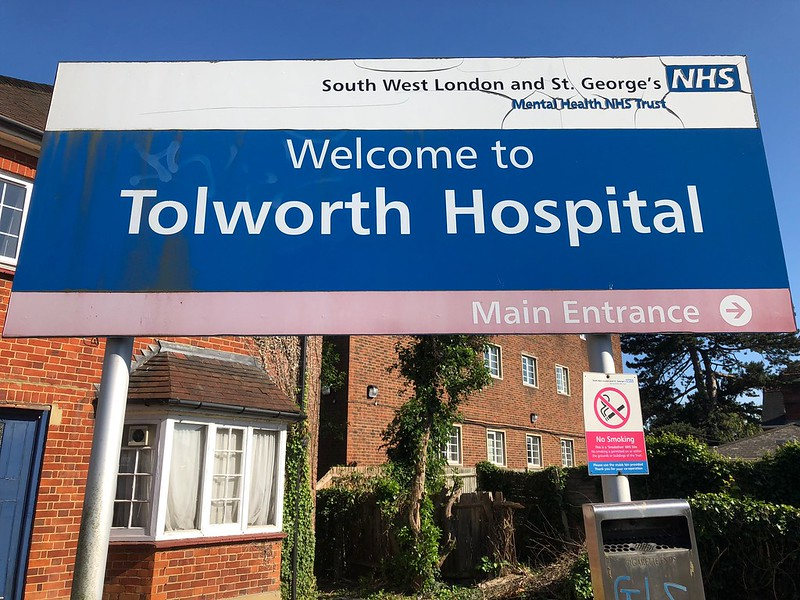
- Signage at Tolworth Hospital

- Location within Kingston upon Thames

Geography
- Location: Tolworth, London, England, United Kingdom
- Coordinates: 51.3795°N 0.2891°W

Organisation
- Care system: NHS England
- Type: Mental health

Services
- Emergency department: No Accident & Emergency

Links
- Website: www.swlstg.nhs.uk
- Lists: Hospitals in England

Tolworth Hospital is a health facility in Tolworth, London. It is managed by the South West London and St George's Mental Health NHS Trust.

== History ==
The facility, which was designed by William Jacomb Gibbon and Walter Henry Woodroffe as an isolation hospital, was completed in 1889. After one ward was badly damaged by two bombs in November 1940 during the Second World War, it joined the National Health Service in 1948. In the 1960s the hospital became more focused on geriatric work and new facilities were opened by Princess Alexandra in February 1969. In February 2018 the trust announced plans to carry out an extensive redevelopment of the site.
