= Alpha Tower =

Skyscraper in Birmingham, England

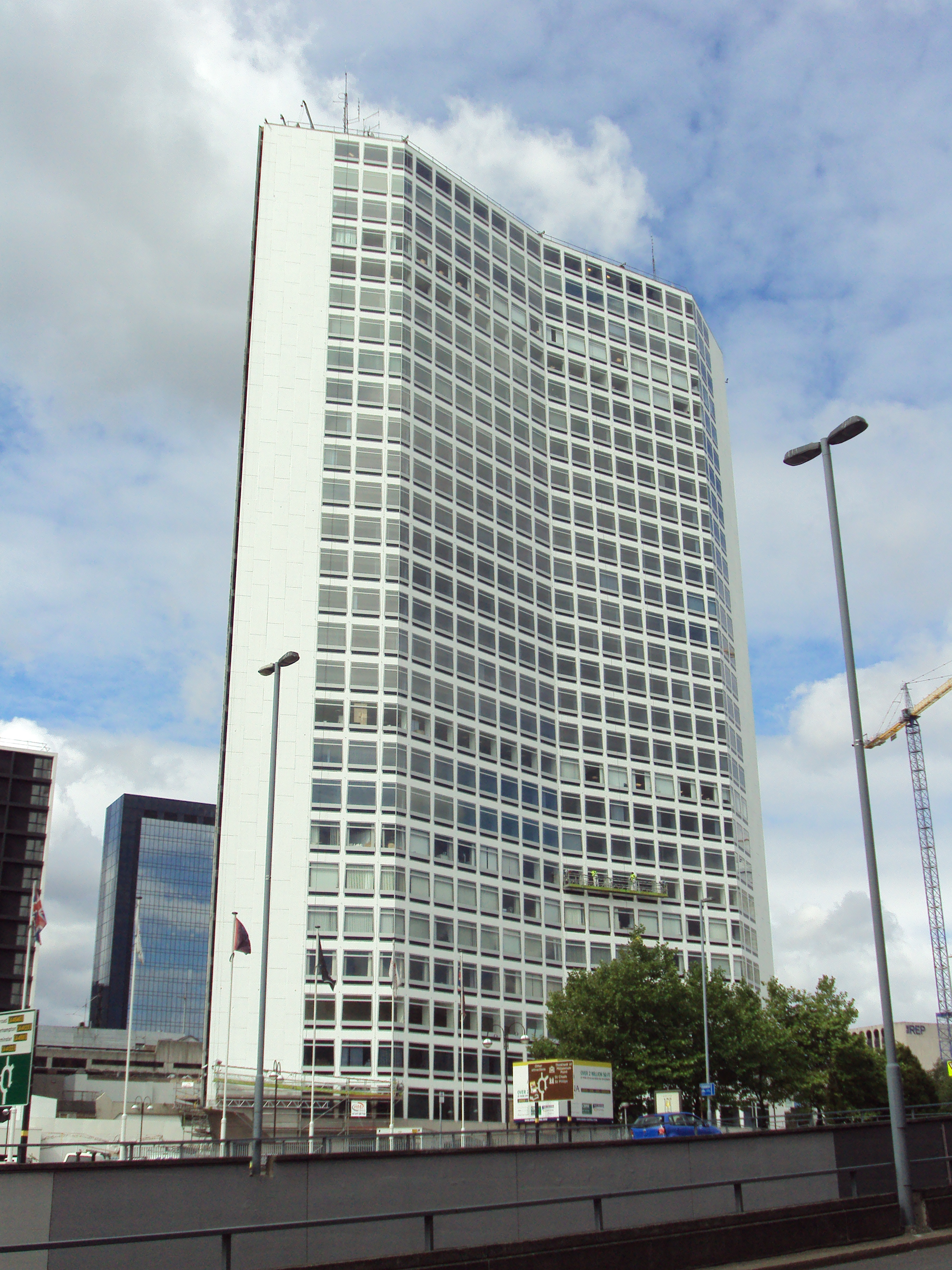
- Interactive map of the Alpha Tower area

General information
- Type: Commercial
- Architectural style: Modernism
- Location: Birmingham, England, Suffolk Street Queensway
- Coordinates: 52°28′43″N 1°54′23″W
- Construction started: 1969
- Completed: 1973
- Owner: Anglo Scandinavian Estates Group

Height
- Height: 100 m (330 ft)

Technical details
- Floor count: 28
- Floor area: 196,105 sq ft (18,218.8 m^{2}); 7,076 sq ft (657.4 m^{2}) (floor plate)

Design and construction
- Architect: George Marsh
- Architecture firm: Richard Seifert & Partners
- Awards and prizes: Grade II listed, Grade A locally listed

Listed Building – Grade II
- Designated: 31 July 2014
- Reference no.: 1420049

Alpha Tower is a Grade II listed office skyscraper in Birmingham, England. It was designed by the Birmingham-born architect George Marsh of Richard Seifert & Partners as the headquarters of the commercial television company ATV (Associated Television) and part of the company's production studio complex known as ATV Centre, an adjacent shorter tower was planned but was never built. ATV closed in 1982, after which the building became offices.

At 100 m (330 ft), as of 2023 it is the eighth-tallest building in Birmingham, and became the twelfth-tallest office building in Birmingham after 103 Colmore Row (108 m (354 ft)) was topped out in 2020.

== Building and architecture ==
It is a Grade A locally listed building. It was nominated for listed building status by the Twentieth Century Society in 2002, although the owners applied for a Certificate of Immunity from Listing. However, English Heritage added Alpha Tower to the National Heritage List for England on 31 July 2014.

According to English Heritage:

The building is one of the most aesthetically successful office buildings in Birmingham with a shaped outline and careful detailing giving it a dynamic forcefulness. Its design successfully combined several ideas into a powerful and elegant building which soon became, and has continued to be, one of the most popular landmarks of the rebuilding of Birmingham city centre in the mid 20th century.

== Ownership ==
In the early 1990s the building was owned by Ellerman Investments - in turn owned by the Barclay Brothers.

Arena Central Developments sold the building to Catalyst's European Property Fund in 2008 for £42.5 million. Birmingham City Council left tenancy in 2010 leaving the building 77% void. Nationwide Building Society put the building into receivership in 2012 and put it on the market for £10.25 million in 2013.

The building was bought for £14million in February 2014 by Anglo Scandinavian Estates Group who were set to invest £9 million in a refurbishment of the building. In September 2023, The Business Desk reported that the refurbishment had been completed at the cost of £16.6 million.

== Occupancy ==
In 1999, Birmingham City Council secured a lease deal to occupy the building's office space, as they were in the process of moving out from the Baskerville House. Subsequently, the council took a large tenancy of the building in 2000. They vacated in 2010.

== In popular culture ==
The tower featured in the Cliff Richard film Take Me High (1973) for both exterior and interior shots.
