= St Giles's Pound =

Coordinates: 51.5165°N 0.1305°W

St Giles's Pound was a cattle pound at St Giles Circus in central London in the 17th and 18th centuries, at the intersection of the roads from Hampstead and from Oxford. It became a point from which distances to London were measured.

The pound was located in the parish of St Giles-in-the-Fields, close to the boundary with St Anne, Westminster. It was originally located in the middle of St Giles High Street, but was moved in 1656 to the corner of Tottenham Court Road, Oxford Street and St Giles High Street. It was removed in 1765.

It is mentioned in the old song Jack Chance: "On Newgate steps Jack Chance was found, and bred up near St Giles's Pound."
