= Space House =

Building in London, England

Coordinates: 51.5148°N 0.1195°W

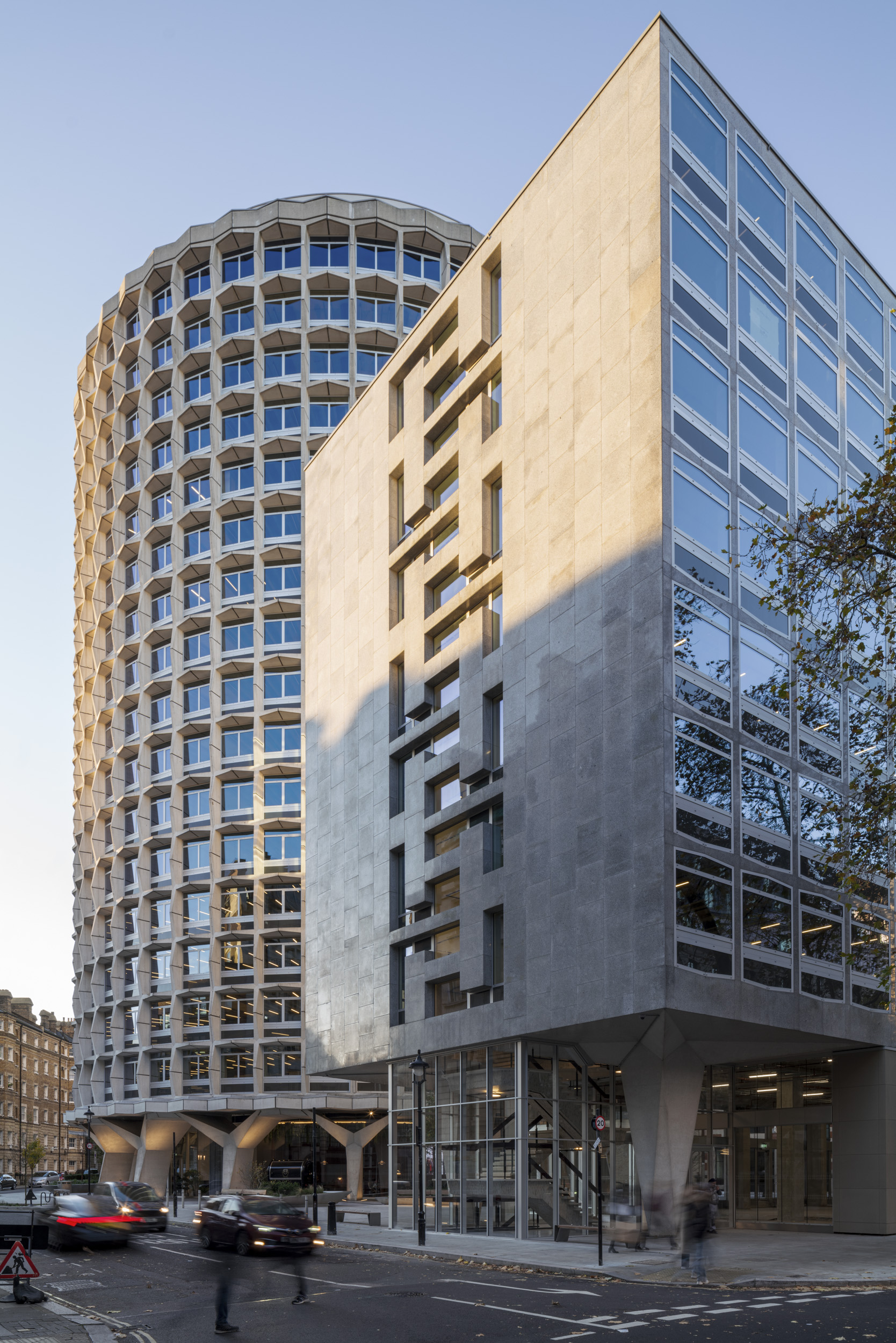
Space House from Kemble Street

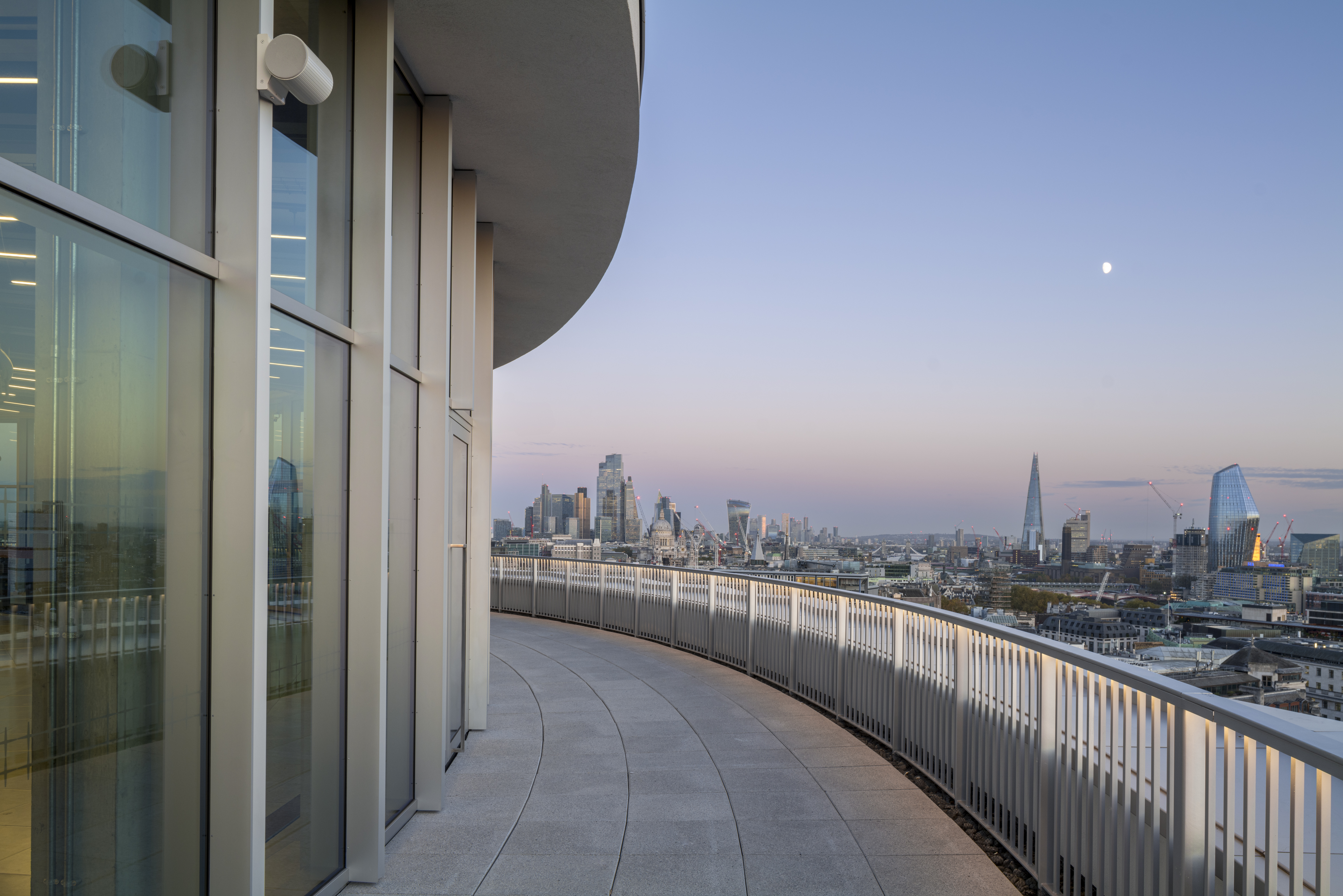
View from the Rooftop

Space House, also formerly known as One Kemble Street, Civil Aviation Authority House and CAA House, is an architecturally notable building off Kingsway in the London Borough of Camden. It is a grade II listed building with Historic England. Like nearby Centre Point, it was built for the developer Harry Hyams as part of the 1960s commercial property boom and kept empty for several years after completion.

== Design and construction ==
The building was designed by George Marsh, a partner in Richard Seifert's architectural firm, for Oldham Estates, the vehicle for the developer Harry Hyams, and built between 1964 and 1968 by Robert McAlpine and Sons. Marsh had also designed the nearby Centre Point, also for Hyams. The consulting engineer was Wilem Frischmann of C.J. Pell & Partners.

Space House replaced the Edwardian building Magnet House, built by Hugo Hirst for his General Electric Company in 1921, and comprises a rectangular eight-storey office building at 45–59 Kingsway and a cylindrical tower now known as One Kemble Street on a triangular plot to the west bounded by Kemble Street, Wild Street and Keeley Street. The cylindrical shape was chosen in order not to block the light of the buildings in those streets. The buildings are joined by a two-level enclosed walkway. Underneath the building is a car park that originally had a mini filling station.

The 16-storey tower was built using a façade of precast cruciform blocks of white concrete joined by dowels and dry grout. They were laid out in a grid pattern to allow fast and low-cost construction without the need to use a scaffold. Each block is of 10 feet (3.0 metres) diameter, the same height as each storey, with a precast concrete floor panel forming the base of each storey and radiating out from a central core. The base of the tower incorporates Y-shaped columns of capstone concrete as also used at Centre Point. The concrete units in the building were made by Portcrete Limited.

The eight-storey block on Kingsway was also built using precast concrete blocks, with the addition of a row of central supporting columns. It was laid out with a large central office space and services and circulation at each end of the building.

== Later history ==
The building was first let to the Civil Aviation Authority (CAA) in 1975. It had large-scale refurbishments in 1996 and 2003. It was listed grade II with Historic England in January 2015. The Kingsway block is now known as CAA House while the tower has been renamed One Kemble Street and had tenants such as the main office of the Government Legal Department and the Office of Rail and Road. The CAA's lease ended in December 2019 and these agencies have since vacated the building.

== Redevelopment ==
The Civil Aviation Authority left the building and from 2022 it was redeveloped by Squire and Partners and Seaforth Land. The redevelopment removed the plant floor at the top of the tower and replaced it with a "facsimile" floor and another set back. It received a 2026 RIBA National Award.

== Gallery ==
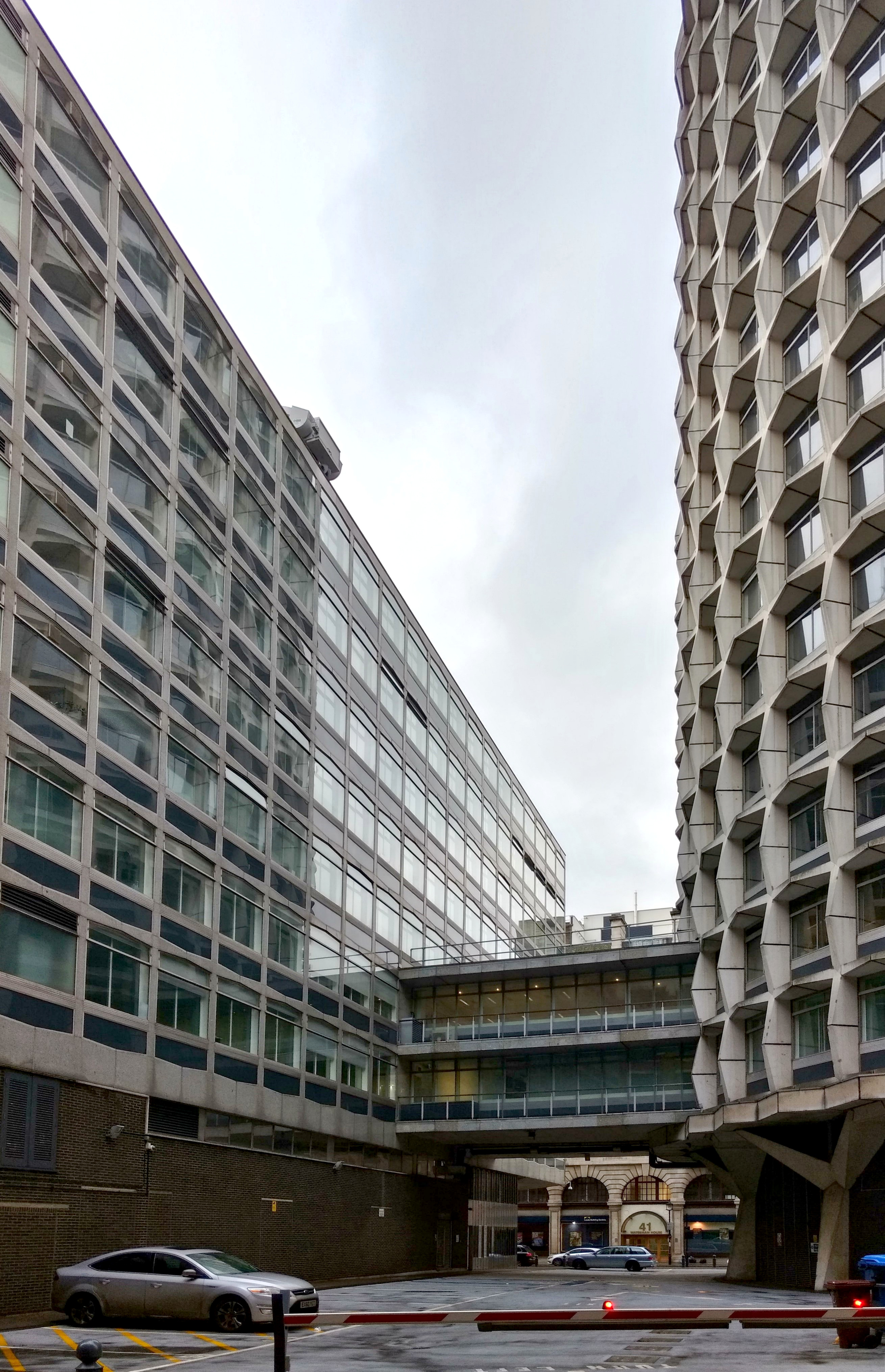
Covered walkway between buildings

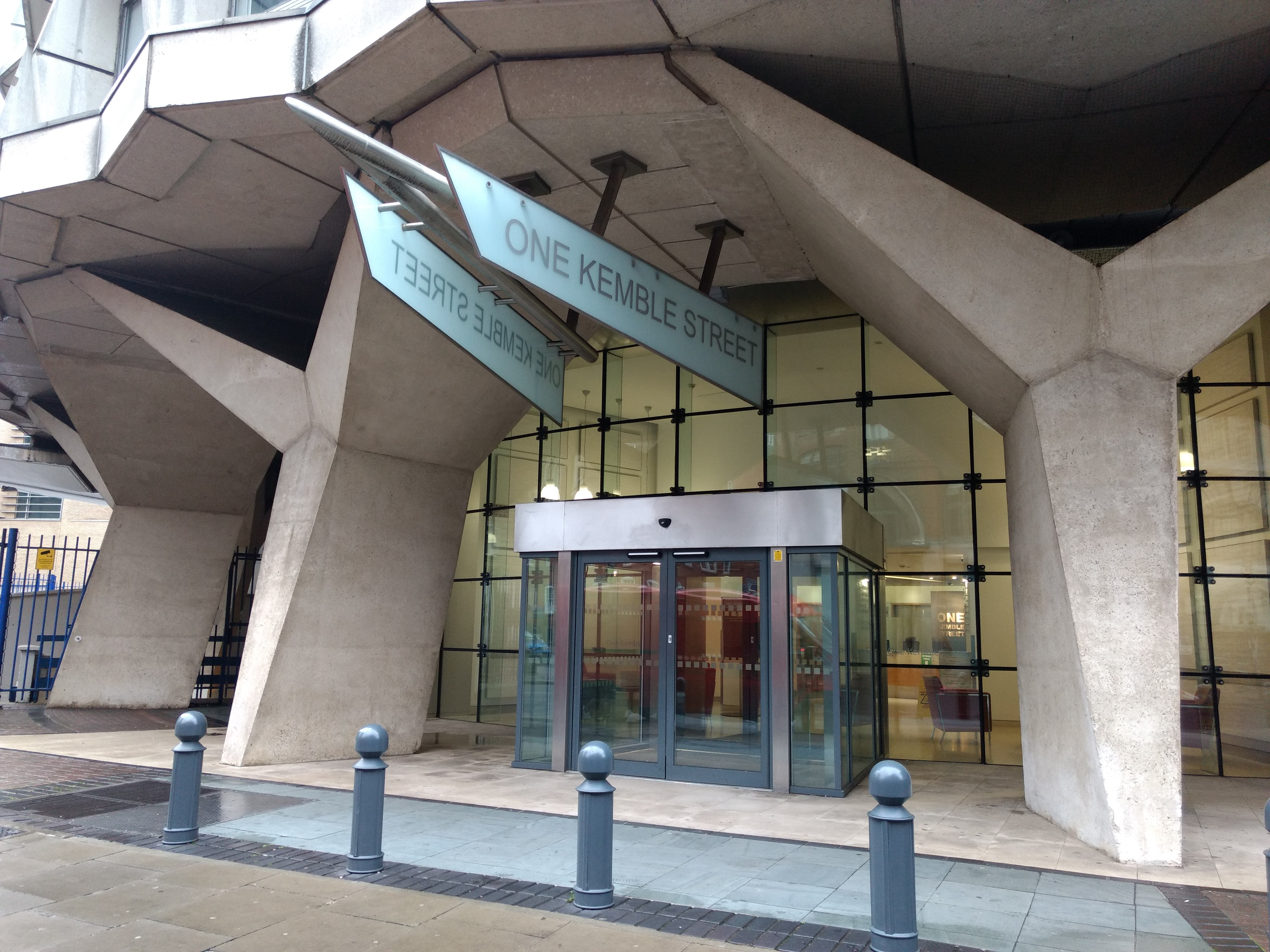
Entrance to tower with Y-shaped supporting blocks

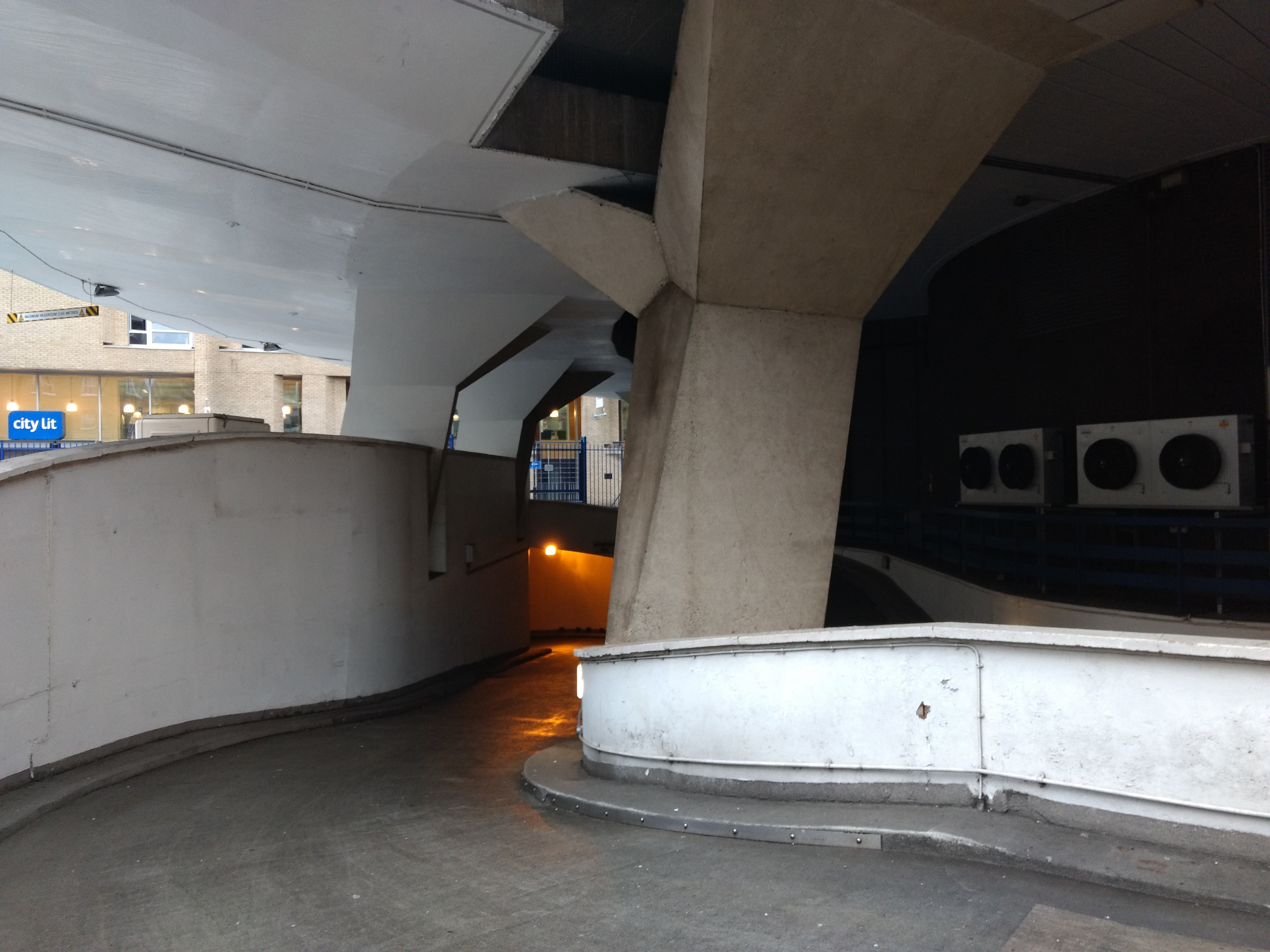
Underground car park entrance

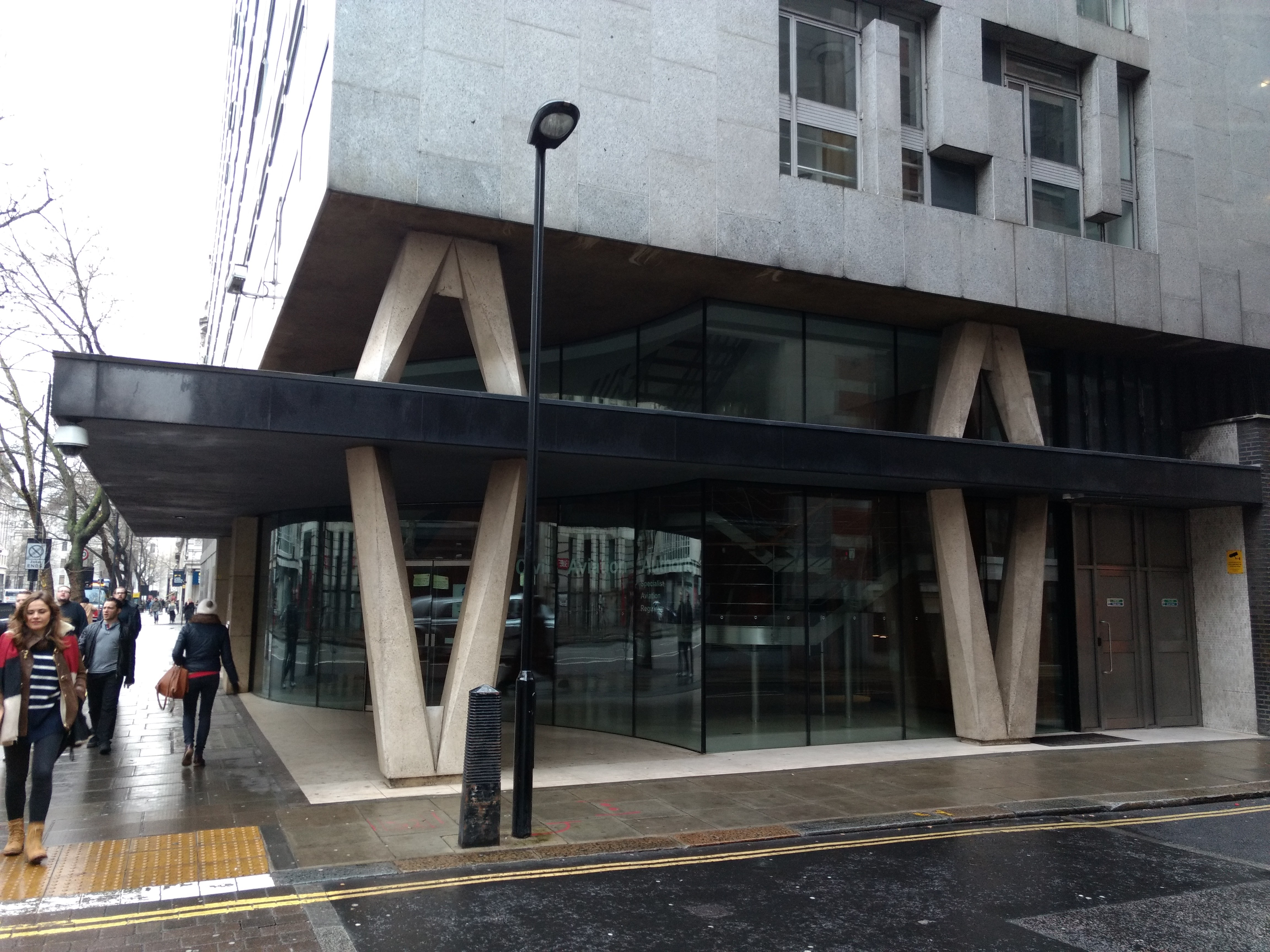
Keeley Street elevation of Kingsway block
