= Centre Point =

Building in Central London, England

Coordinates: 51°30′57.1″N 00°07′46.9″W

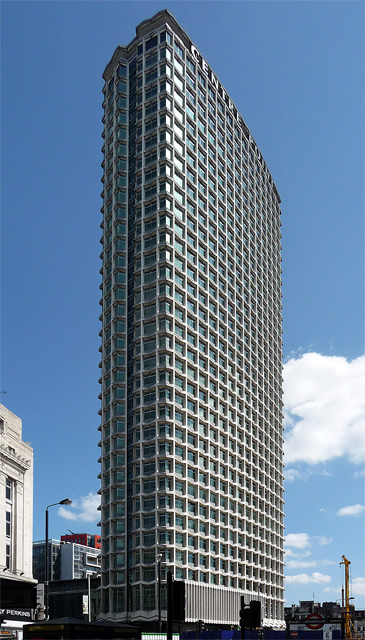

General information
- Status: Completed
- Type: Residential (converted from commercial)
- Architectural style: Modernist
- Location: New Oxford Street, London, WC1, United Kingdom
- Construction started: 1963
- Completed: 1966
- Renovated: 2016–18

Height
- Height: 117 m (384 ft)

Technical details
- Structural system: Reinforced concrete
- Floor count: 34

Design and construction
- Architect: George Marsh
- Architecture firm: R. Seifert and Partners
- Structural engineer: Pell Frischmann
- Main contractor: Wimpey Construction

Website
- centrepointresidences.co.uk

Centre Point is a building in Central London, comprising a 34-storey tower; a 9-storey block to the east including shops, offices, retail units and maisonettes; and a linking block between the two at first-floor level. It occupies 101–103 New Oxford Street and 5–24 St Giles High Street, WC1, with a frontage also to Charing Cross Road, close to St Giles Circus and almost directly above Tottenham Court Road tube station. The site was once occupied by a gallows, and the tower sits directly over the former route of St Giles High Street, which had to be re-routed for the construction.

The building is 117 m (385 ft) high, has 34 floors and 27,180 m^{2} (292,563 sq ft) of floor space. Constructed from 1963 to 1966, it was one of the first skyscrapers in London, and as of 2009 was the city's joint 27th-tallest building. It stood empty from the time of its completion until 1975, and was briefly occupied by housing activists in 1974. Since 1995 it has been a Grade II listed building. In 2015, it was converted from office space to flats.

== Construction and history ==
The building was designed by George Marsh of the architects R. Seifert and Partners, with engineers Pell Frischmann, and was constructed by Wimpey Construction from 1963 to 1966 for £5.5 million. The precast segments were formed of fine concrete, utilising crushed Portland stone; they were made by Portcrete Limited at Portland, Isle of Portland, Dorset, and transported to London by lorry. Centre Point was built as speculative office space by property tycoon Harry Hyams, who had leased the site at £18,500 a year for 150 years. Hyams intended that the whole building be occupied by a single tenant, and negotiated fiercely for its approval. On completion, the building remained vacant for many years, leading to its being referred to as "London's Empty Skyscraper". With property prices rising and most business tenancies taken for set periods of 10 or 15 years, Hyams could afford to keep it empty and wait for his single tenant at the asking price of £1,250,000; he was challenged to allow tenants to rent single floors, but consistently refused. At that time skyscrapers were rare in London, and Centre Point's prominence led to its becoming a rallying symbol for opponents. The homeless charity Centrepoint was founded in 1969 as a homeless shelter in nearby Soho, named Centrepoint in response to the building Centre Point being seen as an "affront to the homeless" for being left empty to make money for the property developer.

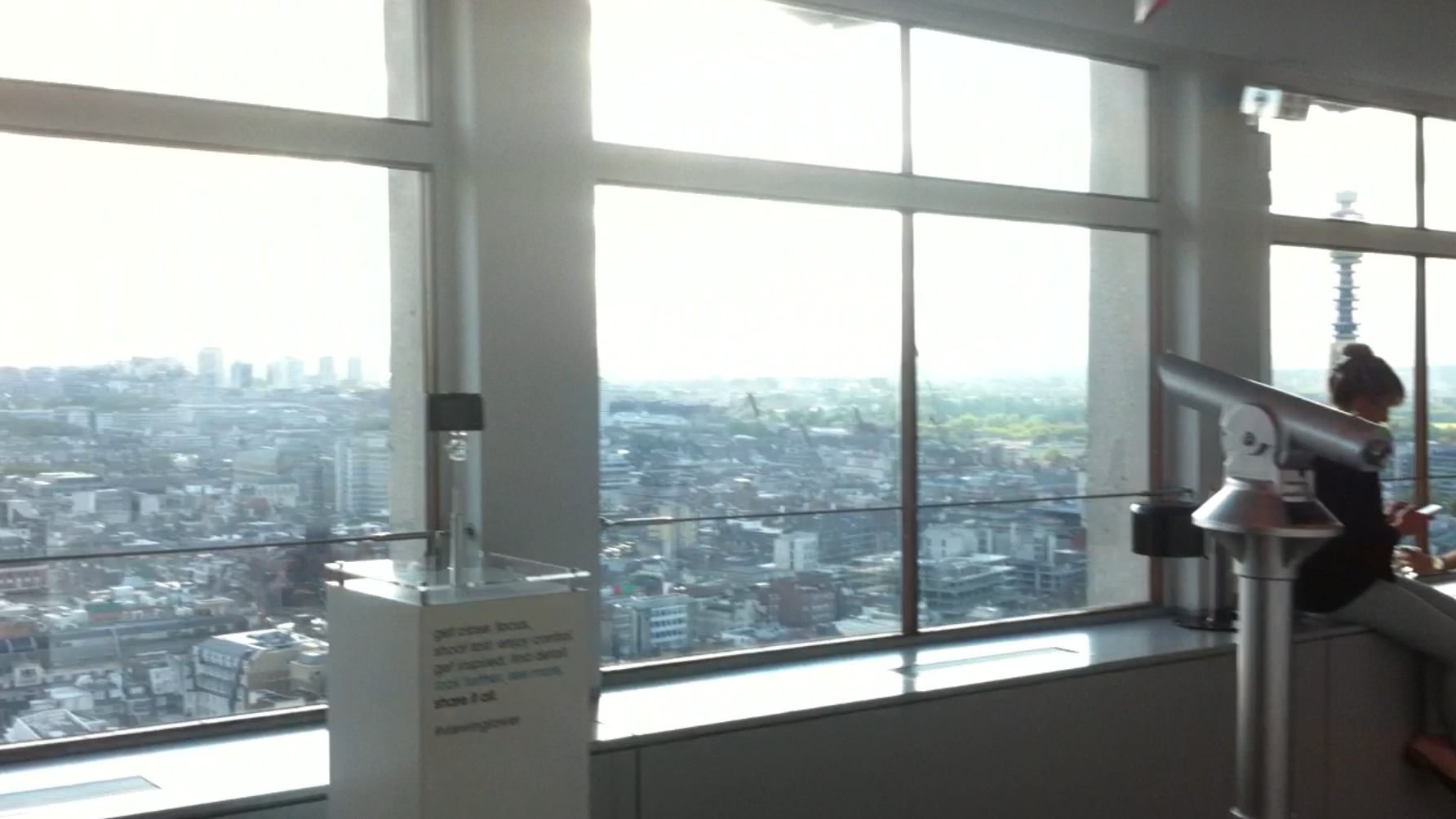
Centre Point observation deck

In 1974 an umbrella group of Direct Action housing campaigners, including Jim Radford, Ron Bailey and Jack Dromey, organised a weekend occupation of Centre Point from 18 January to 20 January to draw attention to its being deliberately left empty during a housing crisis in London. Two of the occupiers had obtained jobs with the Burns Security Company, which was guarding the building. From July 1980 to March 2014, Centre Point was the headquarters of the Confederation of British Industry (CBI) which became, at 33 years and seven months, the building's longest-standing tenant.

In October 2005, Centre Point was bought from the previous owners, Blackmoor LP, by commercial property firm Targetfollow for £85 million. The building was extensively refurbished. As of 2009 occupants included US talent agency William Morris; the state-owned national oil company of Saudi Arabia, Aramco; Chinese oil company PetroChina; and electronic gaming company EA Games. It has since been purchased by Almacantar. Almacantar approached Conran and Partners for the refurbishment of the tower including change of use from office to residential, whilst MICA, formerly Rick Mather Architects, led the refurbishment of the lower rise buildings and the new affordable housing block. In 2015 work began on conversion of the building to residential flats. The restoration and conversion of the tower to a residential building was finished in March 2018. Much as had been the case at its original opening, the refurbished tower remains largely empty, with few windows lit in the evenings, the rest in darkness, despite at least half its units being sold. This has led to its being called one of London's "ghost towers".

== Transport ==
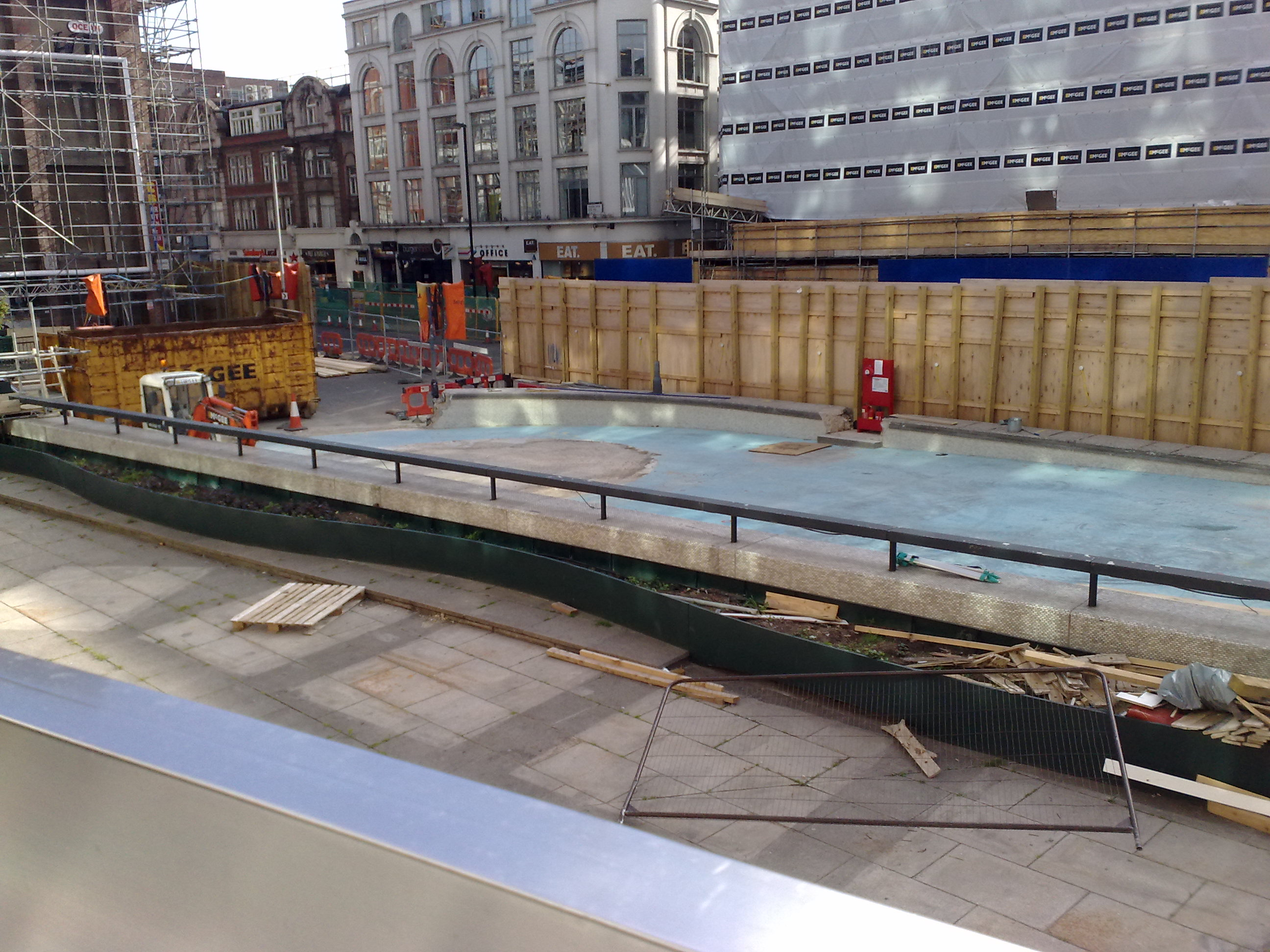
The Centre Point fountains have been removed as part of the demolition of the plaza for Crossrail.

The promised transport interchange and highways improvements were not delivered following the original plan. The pedestrian subway attracted anti-social activities.

On 19 June 2006, the Commission for Architecture and the Built Environment pointed to the building as an example of bad design, where badly-designed pavements force pedestrians into the bus lane and account for the highest level of pedestrian injuries in Central London. With the planned redevelopment of Tottenham Court Road Underground Station, a framework has been adopted to redevelop the traffic island beneath Centre Point as an open space.

== Architectural reception ==
Architecture critic Nikolaus Pevsner described Centre Point as "coarse in the extreme". In 1995 it became a Grade II listed building. In 2009, it won the Concrete Society's Mature Structures Award.

== Cultural references ==
Centre Point's domination of the London skyline is attested to in Neil Gaiman's novel Neverwhere (1996), where it is called "an ugly and distinctive Sixties skyscraper". The character "Old Bailey" camps on top of Centre Point, remarking that "the view from the top was without compare, and, furthermore, the top of Centre Point was one of the few places in the West End of London where you did not have to look at Centre Point itself".

Other mentions of the building touch on it being uninhabited. In an episode of Captain Kremmen, the hero is forced to fire a death ray into London by his captors, but avoids any deaths by aiming it at Centre Point, which is empty. Similarly, the building is mentioned in Series 4 Episode 6 (2012) of British comedy series The Thick of It. During an inquiry into the government's leaking of information to the press, Stuart Pearson, a Conservative spin doctor, is asked about an analogy he has made between government transparency and the Pompidou Centre. A member of the inquiry suggests that instead of a "political Pompidou Centre", Pearson has created "the opposite, Centre Point – I mean everyone sees it looming over them but nobody has the faintest idea what happens in there." Pearson replies, "I think there's some kind of club on the top floor."

== See also ==
- List of tallest buildings and structures in London
- List of tallest buildings
