= George Marsh (architect) =

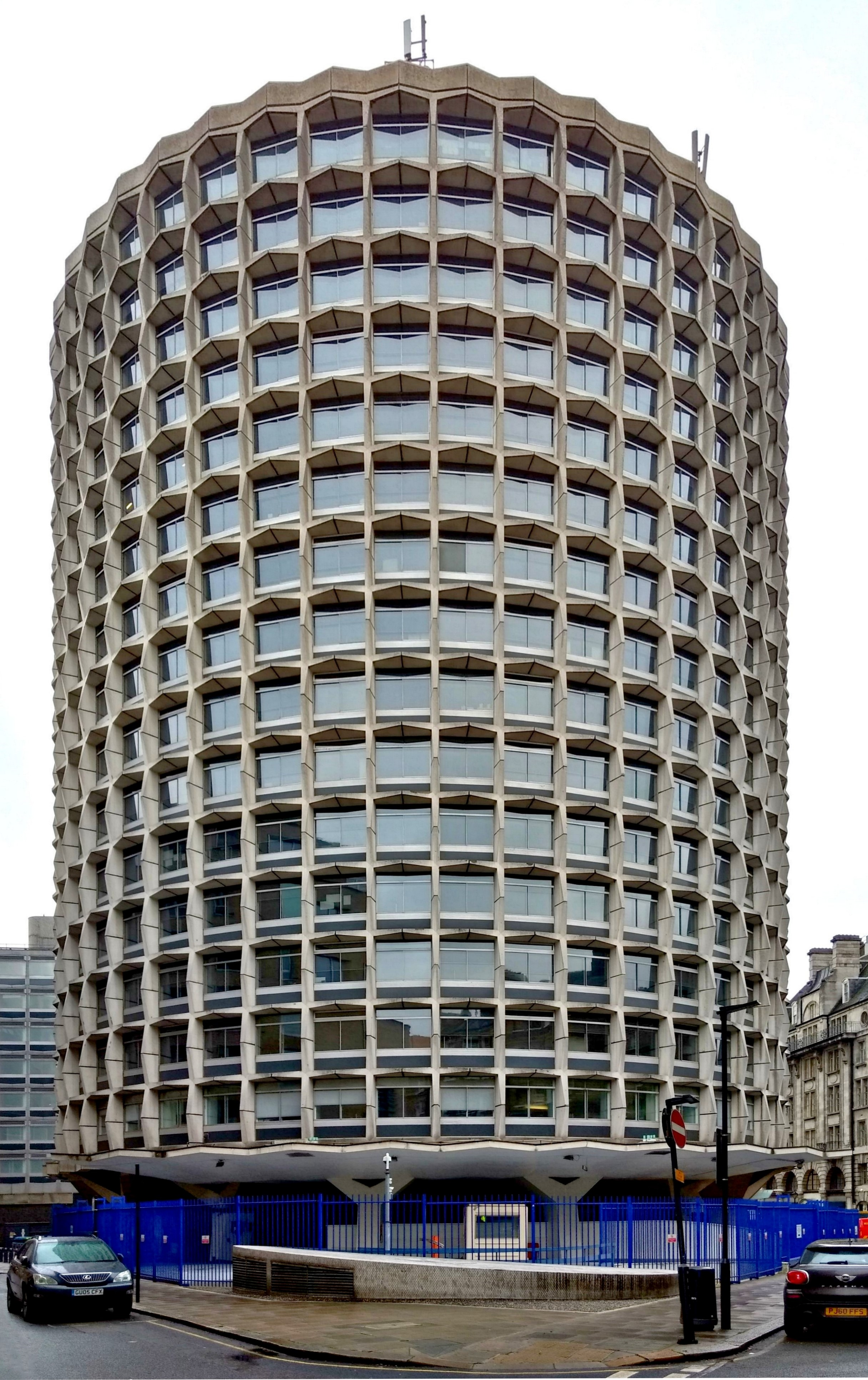
One Kemble Street (originally Space House), designed by George Marsh

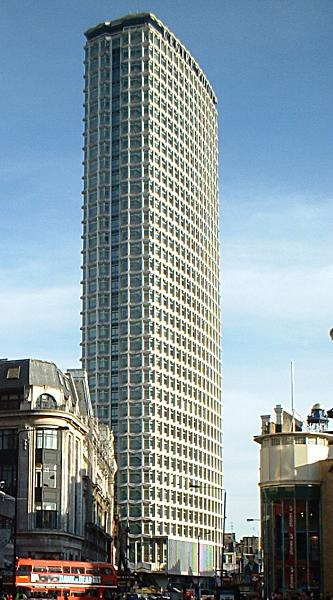
Centre Point

Horace George Marsh (16 March 1921 – October 1998) was an English architect, best known for his work on the design of buildings including Centre Point in London and Alpha Tower in Birmingham, in his role as a partner in the architectural practice of R. Seifert and Partners.

== Early life ==
Born in Birmingham, Marsh studied at the Birmingham School of Architecture while working as a pupil with a local architectural firm, before joining the leading Birmingham architectural practice of H. W. Weedon & Partners in 1941.

== Career in London ==
In 1946, Marsh moved to London, working for a variety of architects until he joined the practice of Richard Seifert in 1957, becoming a founding partner in the newly formed R. Seifert & Partners a year later.

Seifert's own early work is typified by Woolworth House of 1955 on London's Marylebone Road. Marsh's architectural style was very different and brought a fresh design input to the practice. From the time of Marsh's arrival in the late 1950s their work displayed a new-found flamboyance influenced by the Swiss architect Le Corbusier, Brazilian Oscar Niemeyer and the American practice Skidmore, Owings & Merrill. Marsh was to be the practice's leading designer throughout the 1960s and early 1970s and worked closely with Richard Seifert on many of his most important buildings including Tolworth Tower, Centre Point and Space House (formally CAA House) in London, and Alpha Tower in his home city of Birmingham.

Marsh was elected a fellow of the Royal Institute of British Architects in 1968 and retired from practising architecture in March 1986.

== Death and legacy ==
Marsh died in October 1998. Of R.Seifert and Partner's most famous buildings on which Marsh worked, Centre Point was listed grade II in 1995, and Alpha Tower was listed grade II in 2014. The house Marsh built for himself and his family in Radlett, Hertfordshire, was also listed Grade II in 1999.
