= Harry Hyams =

English businessman (1928–2015)

Harry John Hyams
- Occupation: Businessman

Harry John Hyams (2 January 1928 – 19 December 2015) was a British businessman and millionaire who initially made his money as a speculative property developer. He was best known as the developer of the Centre Point office building in London.

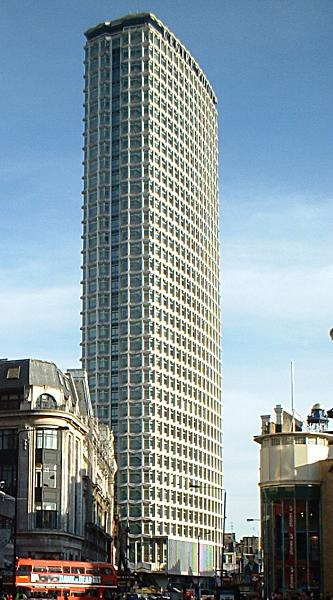
Centre Point, London

== Early life ==
Hyams was born in a Jewish family in Hendon, Middlesex. His father was an importer. After private schooling he joined an advertising agency, then joined an estate agency and switched to property development.

== Career ==
Hyams made much of his fortune developing office space in London at a time in the 1960s and 1970s when rents there were rising significantly. He preferred to find single, blue-chip tenants for his properties, having them fully repair and insure the buildings they occupied, as is now common with commercial property in the UK. This approach enabled Hyams to manage a valuable and sizeable property business with a staff of just six. It was also used by him as justification for keeping his 33-storey Centre Point development empty for years after its completion: he claimed he could find no tenant willing to lease all 202,000 sq ft (18,800 m^{2}) of space. Hyams also developed Space House in London, which similarly sat empty for several years after being completed.

== Private life ==
In 1954 he married his wife Kay in Chelsea. She died 1 February 2011, aged 91. On 19 December 2015, Hyams died at the age of 87.

Between the mid-1960s and 2010, Hyams owned the classic 64 m (210 ft) motor yacht Shemara, although he is thought to have made little use of her.

In 1965 Hyams bought Ramsbury Manor, near Marlborough, Wiltshire, and surrounding land for £650,000 – said at the time to be the highest price paid for a private house in England. In 2008, a raid at Ramsbury Manor by the Johnson Gang was described as the biggest ever private burglary in England. In his will, Hyams gave the house and his collections of fine art and cars to the nation via his Capricorn Foundation, in a bequest reported to be worth £450m.
