= Tolworth Tower =

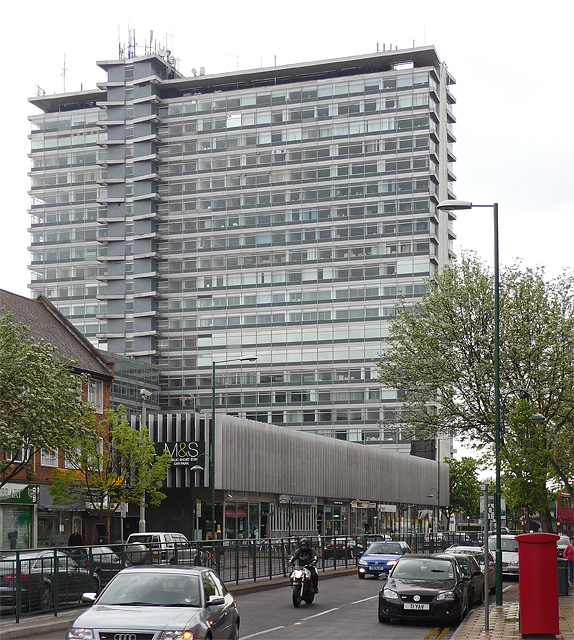
- Tolworth Tower, 2010

General information
- Location: Tolworth, Surbiton, Kingston upon Thames, Greater London
- Coordinates: 51.3801°N 0.2807°W
- Completed: 1964

Height
- Height: 265 ft (81 m)

Technical details
- Floor count: 22

Design and construction
- Architect: George Marsh of R. Seifert and Partners

Tolworth Tower is a landmark high-rise building in Tolworth, in southwest London, England, adjacent to the A3 Kingston by-pass.

Completed in 1964 and designed by architect George Marsh, the 22-storey tower is one of the tallest buildings in outer London and a prominent example of post-war modernist architecture.

== History ==
Tolworth Tower, built on the site of the former Tolworth Odeon Cinema, was constructed as an office block, designed by George Marsh of R. Seifert and Partners. It opened in 1964.

The tower is 265 feet high (81 metres) with 22 floors. The ground floor of the building is occupied largely by a single retail unit. This was originally a Fine Fare supermarket which was the largest supermarket in England at the time of opening and which traded until the early 1980s. The current occupant is a Marks and Spencer supermarket. There also some smaller retail units along the Broadway, and the remainder is taken up with access to the other floors. The remaining floors of the building were originally occupied by commercial and government offices, but the north wing re-opened as a Travelodge hotel in 2005.

The tower and estate has been earmarked for residential redevelopment a number of times in recent years, most recently in 2019 by 3DReid and in 2025 by CNM Estates.

== Gallery ==
View from the top of Tolworth Tower over the local area
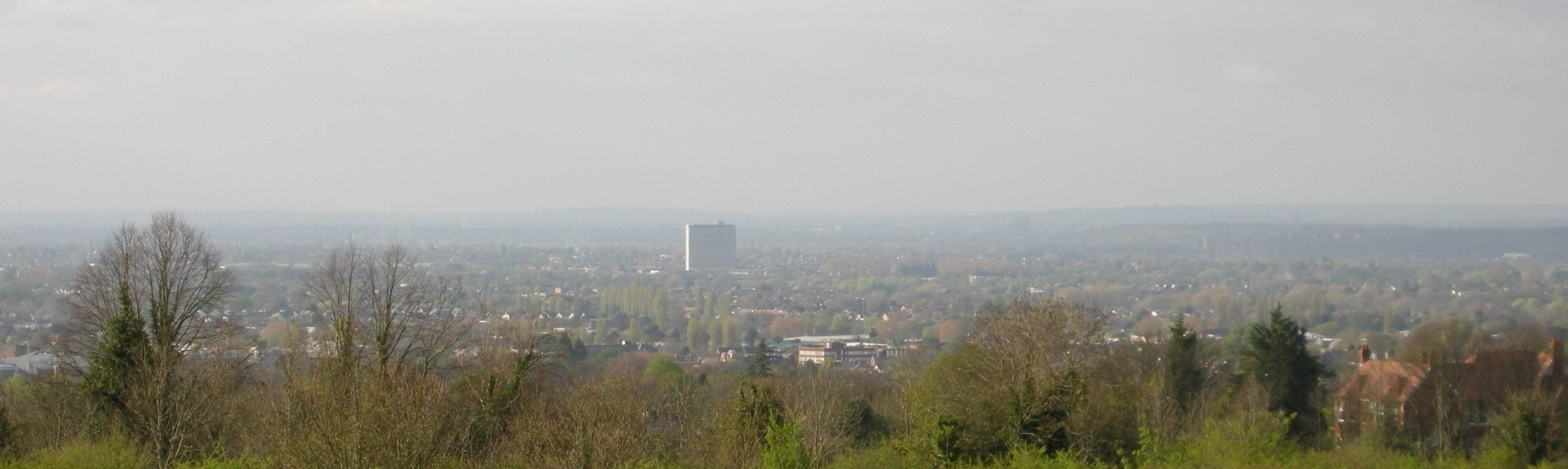
Remote view of Tolworth Tower from Epsom Downs
