= Alphons Magg =

Swiss sculptor (1891-1967)

- Born: 14 July 1891; Zürich, Switzerland
- Died: 8 December 1967 (aged 76); Zollikon, Switzerland
- Known for: Sculpture

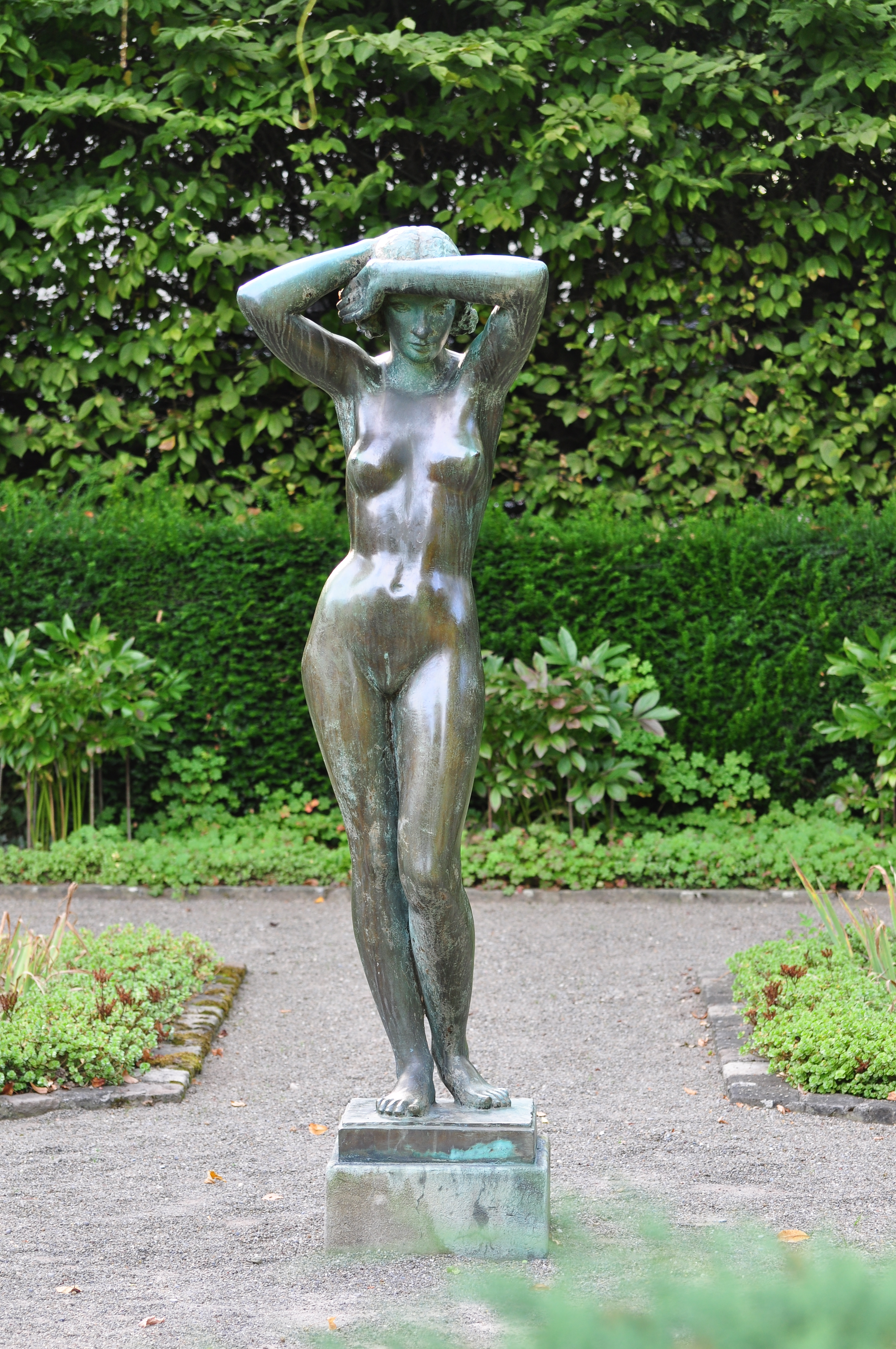
Stehende weibliche Figur (1936), Belvoirpark, Zürich

Alphons Magg (14 July 1891 – 8 December 1967) was a Swiss sculptor whose work centred on religious commissions, funerary and commemorative monuments, and portrait busts. From 1925, he made sculptures for Catholic churches in German-speaking Switzerland.

== Biography ==
Alphons Magg was born in Zürich on 14 July 1891. He attended secondary school at Mehrerau, a Cistercian school near Bregenz. From 1907 to 1909, he pursued commercial training in Zürich, while also attending courses in the graphic department of the Kunstgewerbeschule.

On the advice of the sculptor Carl Burckhardt, he moved to Munich in 1910, where he received private training before working independently as a sculptor. His Munich training reflected the principles of Adolf von Hildebrand, whom Magg later met in 1919. He remained in Munich until 1917 and travelled widely in Europe for study during these years.

Magg married the American pianist Mary Avery around 1916, and the couple had a son. In 1917, he returned to Zürich because of the war. There, he studied French sculpture, particularly the work of Aristide Maillol. He died in Zollikon on 8 December 1967.

== Work ==
Magg’s sculptural work centred on religious commissions, funerary and commemorative monuments, and portrait busts. He also produced nude figures and reliefs. His portrait busts included works depicting Auguste Forel, Pope Pius XII and Franz I, Prince of Liechtenstein.

From 1925, he made numerous sculptures for Catholic churches in German-speaking Switzerland. Between 1931 and 1936, he restored and partly redesigned the sculptural decoration on the east façade of St. Gallen Cathedral. The project led to further commissions at Einsiedeln Abbey and Wettingen Abbey. In 1939, he created the monumental group Rossbändiger for the Swiss National Exhibition in Zürich.

Magg’s religious sculpture reworked traditional Christian subjects in forms that were modern but restrained. His work remained rooted in a conservative artistic outlook associated with Adolf von Hildebrand and favoured classical restraint over avant-garde experiment.

Magg’s Female skater was entered in the sculpture competition at the 1936 Summer Olympics.
