= Daniel Maggs =

South African architect and artist

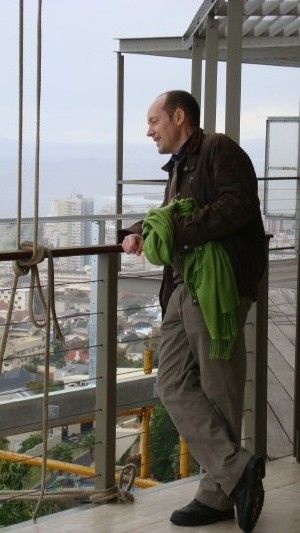
- Born: 1968 (age 57–58)
- Education: Received his BArch from the University of Cape Town
- Known for: Architecture, Installation art

Daniel Maggs (born 1968) is a South African architect and artist living and working in Cape Town. His latest project, ShackRise, exhibited at the Spier Contemporary 2010, depicts a scenario in which an abandoned high-rise development is taken over by squatters.

== Early life ==
Daniel Maggs (born 1968, Cape Town, South Africa) is the son of archeologist Timothy Maggs (ref: Iron Age Communities of the Southern Highveld) and Valerie Maggs (artist and art teacher). Family moved to Pietermaritzburg at age 4, where father took up a post at the Natal Museum. Schooled at Cowan House and Hilton College. Studied architecture at University of Cape Town 1986–1992. Worked for various architectural practices in South Africa and London between 1987 and 1996. Studied for a part-time master's degree under Prof Roloef Uytenbogaardt.

== Career and work ==
Maggs is currently an architect running an architecture practice in Cape Town, and an artist. Concerned with the development of two parallel careers that inform each other. "As an Architect one has to find realistic, practical solutions which are shaped by technical and poetic concerns. The design and construction of buildings can only be a disciplined and positive pursuit, it is about improving the environment".

As an artist, Maggs' work is primarily about the built environment, although he is able to explore different aspects away from the constraints of regular architectural practice . He uses the medium of drawing and painting to explore works that cannot be built, structures that reflect aspects of the current political and social climate of Southern Africa. Often use is made of the language of re cycled and indigent architecture, to explore notions of an 'African design environment'. Maggs is interested in environmental issues, local innovation and making do with what is close at hand.

== Gallery of artworks ==
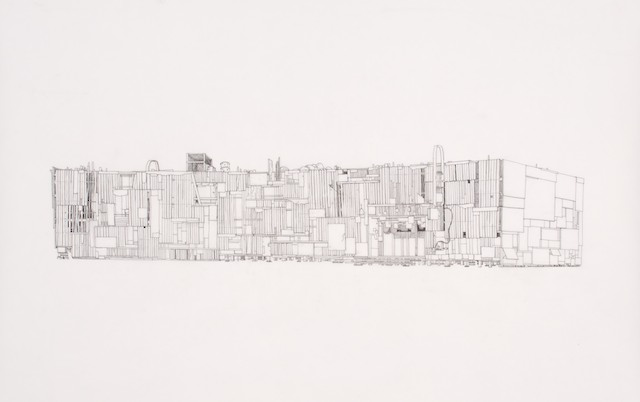

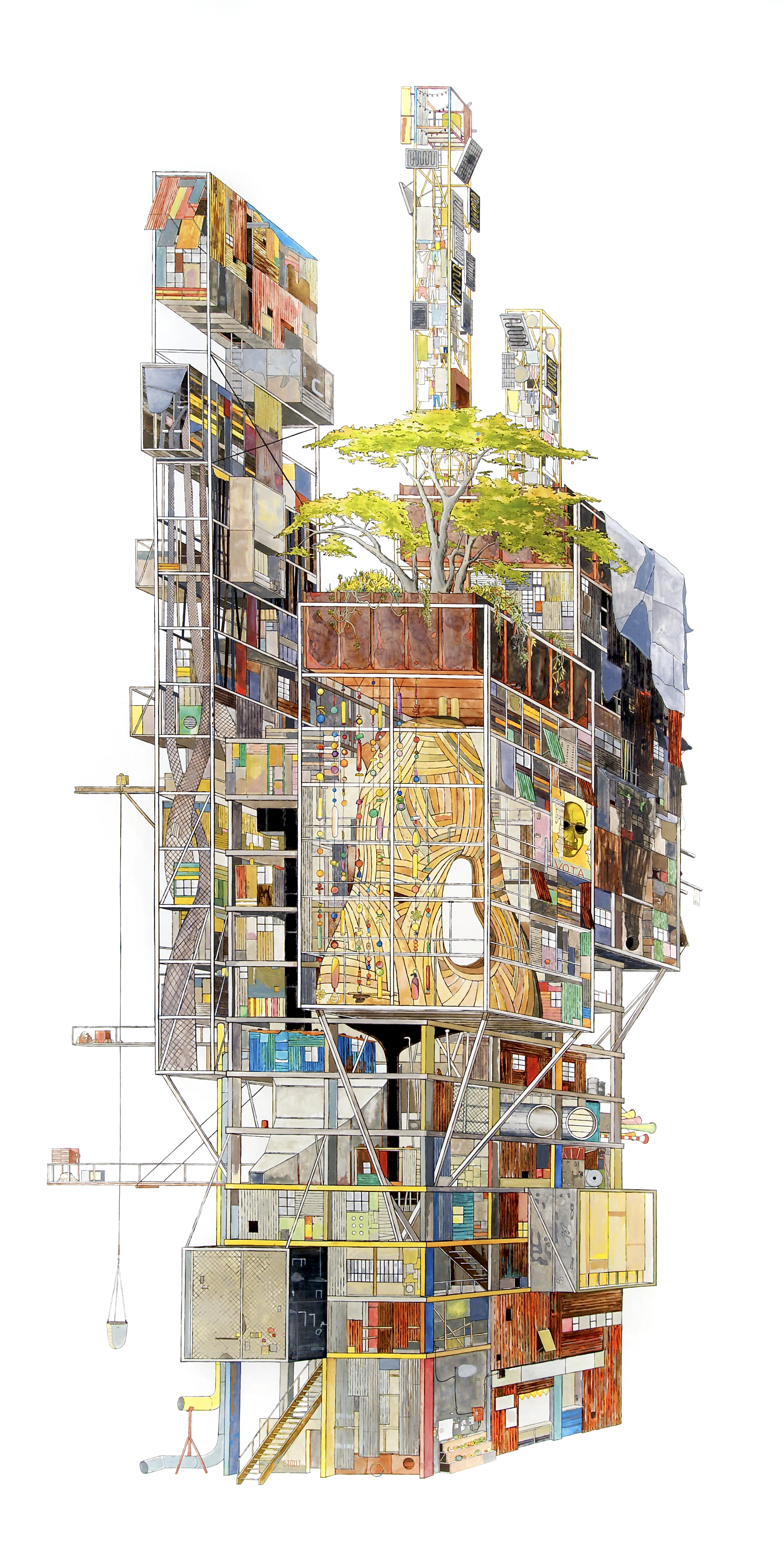

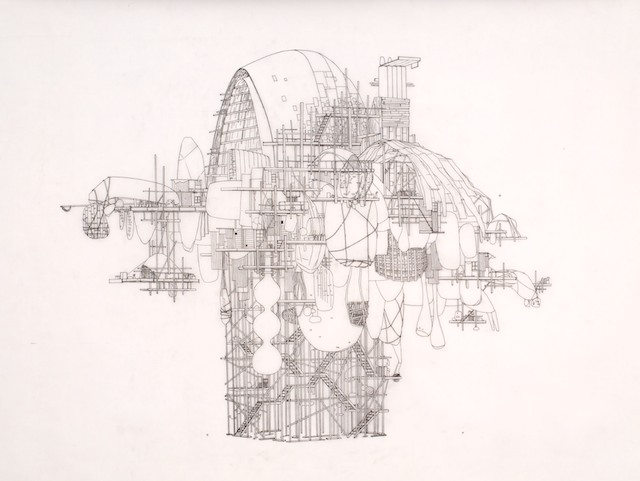

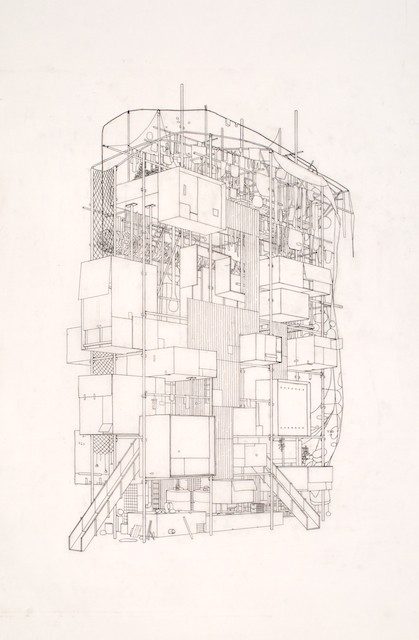

== Selected exhibitions ==
- 1994 Images of Architecture – Seeff Trust Gallery, Cape Town
- 2006 Architects as Artists – AVA Gallery, Cape Town
- 2008 40 x 40 – These Four Walls Gallery, Cape Town
- 2010 Spier Contemporary, Cape Town
- 2010 Draw Links, Gallery AOP, Johannesburg
- 2012 Draw Links 1.2, Gallery AOP, Johannesburg
