= Richard Seifert =

Swiss-British architect

- Born: 25 November 1910; Zürich, Switzerland
- Died: 26 October 2001 (aged 90)
- Occupation: Architect
- Practice: R. Seifert and Partners
- Buildings: NatWest Tower (now Tower 42); Centre Point; Gateway House; Alpha Tower; South Bank Tower; More listed below

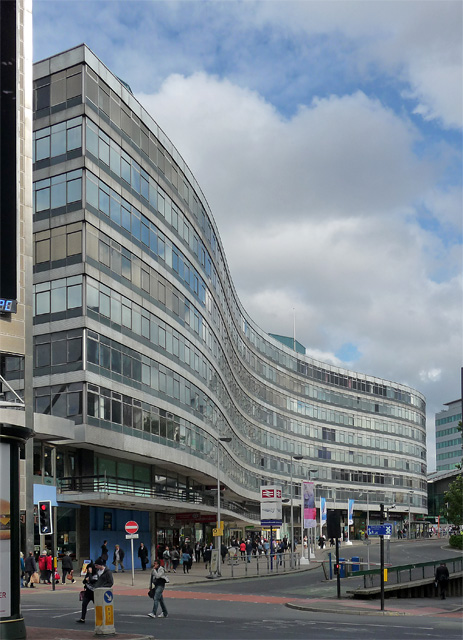
Gateway House, Manchester (1969).

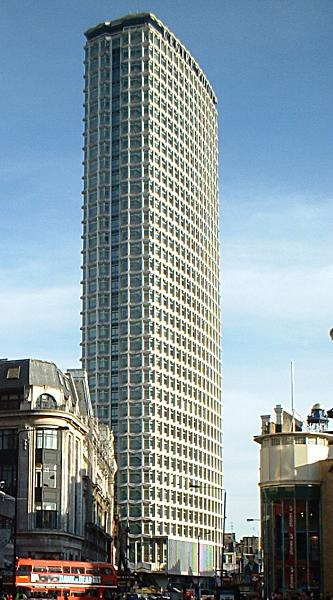
Centre Point, London (1966).

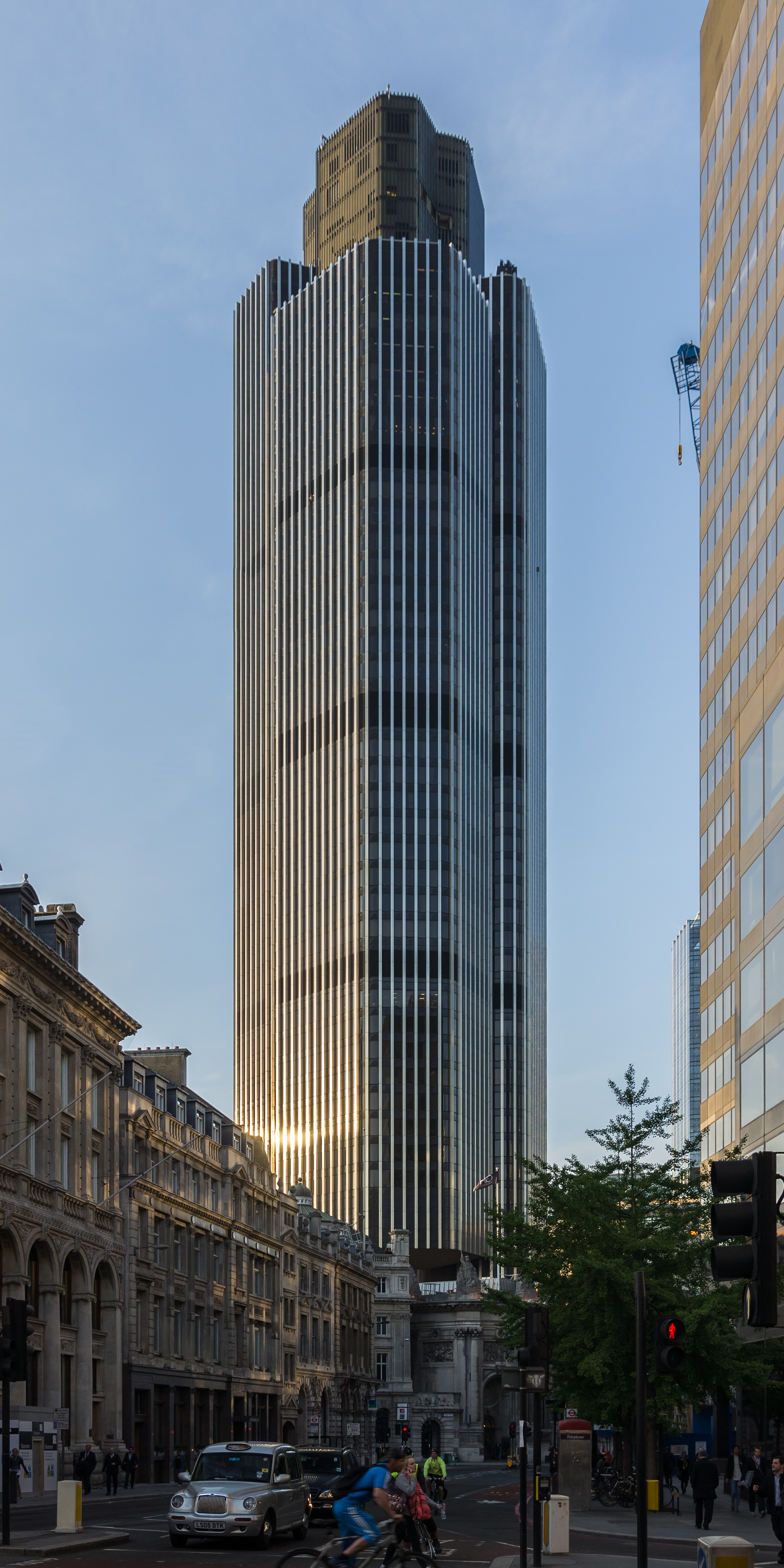
Tower 42, London (1980).

Richard Seifert (born Reubin Seifert; 25 November 1910 – 26 October 2001) was a Swiss-British architect, best known for designing London's NatWest Tower (now officially named Tower 42), once the tallest building in the United Kingdom, and Centre Point.

His eponymously named practice – R. Seifert and Partners (later the R. Seifert Company and Partnership) was at its most prolific in the 1960s and 1970s, responsible for many major office buildings in Central London as well as large urban regeneration projects in other major British cities.

== Biography ==
Seifert was born to a Swiss family and came to London when young. He attended the Central Foundation Boys' School and subsequently obtained a scholarship to the Bartlett School of Architecture, graduating in 1933. Seifert served in the Royal Engineers during World War II.

Seifert and his company were responsible for more London buildings than Sir Christopher Wren and designed more than 500 office blocks across the UK and Europe.

National Life Stories conducted an oral history interview (C467/05) with Richard Seifert in 1996 for its Architects Lives' collection held by the British Library.

== List of works ==
=== London and suburbs ===
- 90 Long Acre, Westminster
- Barnet House, High Road, Totteridge and Whetstone
- Blackfriars Station, Queen Victoria Street, City of London (1977 design, building was redesigned in 2012)
- Beagle House, Tower Hamlets
- Britannia Hotel (The Biltmore, Mayfair Hotel), Grosvenor Square, Mayfair
- Centre Point, New Oxford Street, Camden
- Corinthian House, Lansdowne Road, Croydon
- Drapers Gardens, Throgmorton Avenue, City of London (demolished)
- Essoldo Paddington Cinema, Great Western Road, Westminster (demolished)
- Euston Station, Eversholt Street, Camden
- Farryner House, Monument Street, City of London
- Goodhart Place, Horseferry Road, Limehouse
- Kensington Forum (built as Penta hotel), Cromwell Road, Kensington
- Kings Mall, King Street, Hammersmith 1980
- Kellogg House, Baker Street, Westminster
- Limebank House, Gracechurch Street, City of London (demolished)
- London Metropole Hotel, Edgware Road, Westminster
- New Printing House Square, Gray's Inn Road, Camden
- New London Bridge House, 5 London Bridge Street, Southwark (demolished – site now occupied by The News Building)
- No. 1 Croydon (the NLA Tower), Addiscombe Road, Croydon
- One Kemble Street (Space House), off Kingsway, Camden
- 1, 2 & 3 St John's Square, Finsbury (now known as Gate House, 1 St John's Square, Clerkenwell, Islington)
- Riverside Baths, Erith, Kent (demolished)
- Royal Lancaster Hotel, Lancaster Gate, W2. (1967) (Originally intended to be the offices of the Rank Organisation)

- Sobell Leisure Centre, Islington (1973)
- South Bank Tower, Stamford Street, Southwark
- The Pirate Castle, Oval Road, Camden Town, North London
- Tolworth Tower, Ewell Road, Tolworth, Kingston upon Thames
- Tower 42, Bishopsgate, City of London
- Wembley Conference Centre, Wembley, Middlesex
- Windsor House, London, Victoria Street
- Royal Garden Hotel, Kensington

=== Outside London ===
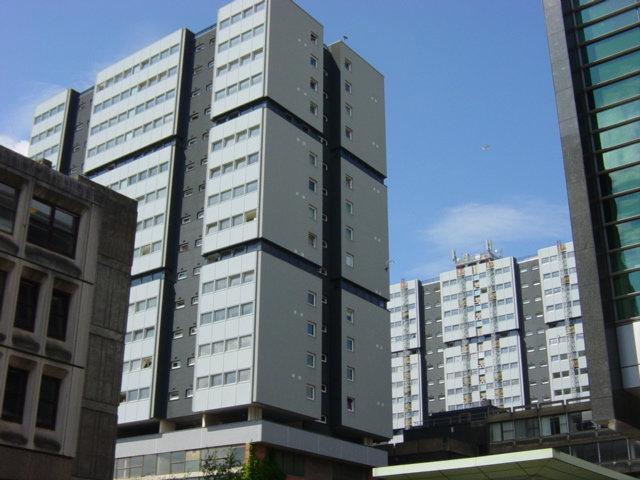
The Anderston Centre, Glasgow (1972).

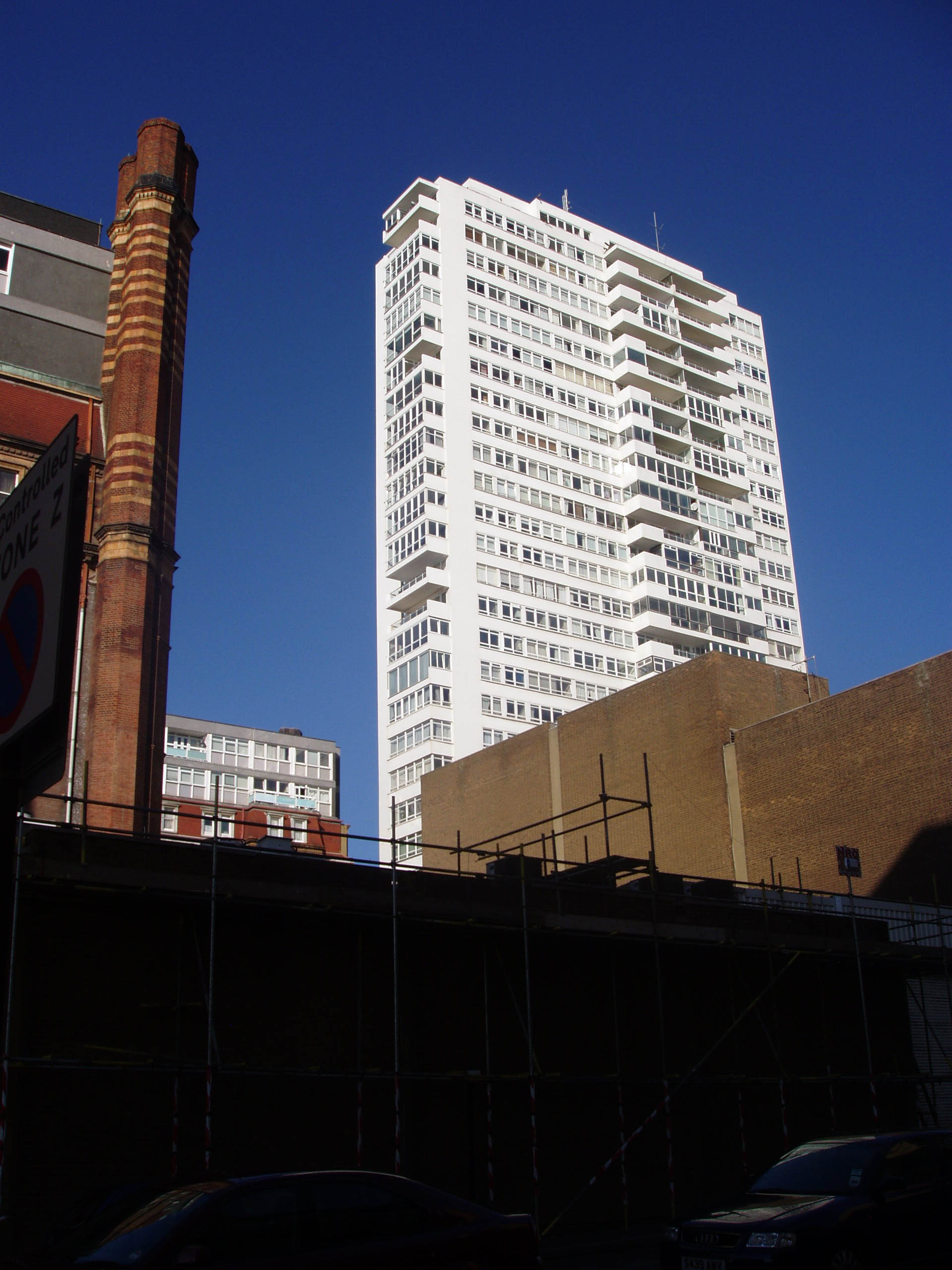
Sussex Heights apartment block, Brighton (1968).

- Alpha Tower, Birmingham
- Anderston Centre, Glasgow (partly demolished 2005-08)
- Concourse House, Liverpool (demolished 2009)
- Elmbank Gardens, Glasgow (partly demolished 2026)
- Heron House, Glasgow
- Hilton House, Hilton Street, Manchester
- Gateway House, Piccadilly Approach, Manchester (1969)
- Metropole Hotel, Birmingham
- Sussex Heights, Brighton
- Hexagon Tower, Manchester
