= List of public art in Covent Garden =

This is a list of public art in Covent Garden, a district in the City of Westminster and the London Borough of Camden.

== City of Westminster ==
Image	Title / subject	Location and coordinates	Date	Artist / designer	Architect / other	Type	Designation	Notes
	Melpomene	Royal Opera House	c. 1808–1809	John Charles Felix Rossi	Edward Middleton Barry	Statue in niche	Grade I	
	Thalia	Royal Opera House	c. 1808–1809	John Flaxman	Edward Middleton Barry	Statue in niche	Grade I	
	Ancient and Modern Drama	Royal Opera House	c. 1808–1809	John Charles Felix Rossi after John Flaxman	Edward Middleton Barry	Frieze	Grade I	
More images	Augustus Harris Memorial Drinking Fountain	Theatre Royal, Drury Lane (Catherine Street) 51.5128°N 0.1207°W	1897	Thomas Brock	Sidney R. J. Smith	Wall monument with drinking fountain and sculpture	Grade I	Unveiled 1 November 1897. The bust of Harris is in a niche flanked by brackets adorned with a Masonic motif. Below is a relief of infants personifying Comedy and Tragedy, reclining over a rusticated basement, within which are a lion's head water spout and basins. A lyre crowns the pediment and other musical instruments are represented in bronze reliefs on the columns.
	Memorial to David Garrick	27 Southampton Street 51.5112°N 0.1224°W	1901	Henry Charles Fehr	Charles Fitzroy Doll	Plaque with relief sculpture	—N/a	A profile portrait of the actor is flanked by figures of the Tragic and Comic Muses. Inscribed DAVID GARRICK/ LIVED HERE/ 1750–1772/ ΜΕΛΠΟΜΕΝΗ/ ΘΑΛΕΙΑ
More images	Young Dancer	Broad Court, off Bow Street 51.5136°N 0.1225°W	1988	Enzo Plazzotta	—N/a	Statue	—N/a	Unveiled 16 May 1988. A gift to Westminster City Council by the sculptor's estate.
	Neptune Fountain	Churchyard of St Paul's, Covent Garden 51.5114°N 0.1235°W	1995	Philip Thomason	Donald Insall	Fountain with sculpture	—N/a	Part of the southern gate of the church, reconstructed to Inigo Jones's design after it had been removed in 1877. The material used is a very close match to Coade stone, the recipe for which has been lost.
	Sculpture	Maiden Lane 51.5105°N 0.1236°W	1998	Eamonn Hughes	—N/a	Sculpture	—N/a	
More images	Market Memorial	Southampton Street 51.5115°N 0.1225°W	2006	Glynis Jones Owen	Covent Garden Housing Project Architects	Bronze relief panel	—N/a	Commemorates the fruit traders who worked at Covent Garden Market from 1670 to 1974. The deliberately crude style is intended to be in the spirit of the chapbooks popular in the 18th century.
More images	The Conversion of Saint Paul	Churchyard of St Paul's, Covent Garden 51.5117°N 0.1238°W	2010	Bruce Denny	—N/a	Equestrian sculpture	—N/a	Unveiled 20 March 2015 by Judi Dench. Originally commissioned for an exhibition of 2010 marking the tercentenary of the rebuilding of St Paul's Cathedral.
More images	Memorial to Agatha Christie	Corner of Great Newport Street and Cranbourn Street 51.5118°N 0.1274°W	2012	Ben Twiston-Davies	—N/a	Memorial with sculpture	—N/a	Unveiled 18 November 2012. Marks the 60th year of the run of Christie's play The Mousetrap, the longest in theatrical history, which is staged nearby at St Martin's Theatre. The memorial takes the form of a book as Christie is also the world's best-selling novelist. Miss Marple, Hercule Poirot, the Orient Express and a country house are depicted in relief on the book's cover.
	Diamond Jubilee Memorial Diamond Jubilee of Elizabeth II	Churchyard of St Paul's, Covent Garden 51.5115°N 0.1236°W	2012	?	—N/a	Relief set into pavement	—N/a	A small, brick labyrinth encircling a relief of an over-sized coin.
More images	Powerhouse	Bull Inn Court	2013	John Atkin	—N/a	Relief attached to building	—N/a	The cogs represent the power station of the Charing Cross Electricity Supply Company that was on this site.
More images	The Dorothea Dorothea of Caesarea	Mercer Walk	2017	Jill Watson	—N/a	Relief attached to building	—N/a	Unveiled 2017. Dedicated to Dorothea of Caesarea, the patron saint of orchards. Situated on land donated to the Worshipful Company of Mercers in 1530 by Joan Leche, Lady Bradbury, widow of Mercer and Lord Mayor of London Thomas Bradbury.

== London Borough of Camden ==
Image	Title / subject	Location and coordinates	Date	Artist / designer	Architect / other	Type	Designation	Notes
	Drinking fountain Diamond Jubilee of Queen Victoria	High Holborn 51.5160°N 0.1263°W	1897	?	?	Drinking fountain	Grade II	Presented by the St Giles Board of Works through the Metropolitan Drinking Fountain and Cattle Trough Association.
More images	Drama Through the Ages	Former Saville Theatre, Shaftesbury Avenue	c. 1930–1931	Gilbert Bayes	T. P. Bennett & Son	Frieze	Grade II	A pageant of figures including Sybil Thorndike as Saint Joan, a Greek chorus, Shakespearean characters, the Chester players, Bacchanalian dancers, a harlequinade and a chorus line.
	Roundels	Former Saville Theatre, Shaftesbury Avenue	c. 1930–1931	Gilbert Bayes	T. P. Bennett & Son	Reliefs	Grade II	Five overlapping pairs of roundels representing artistic eras: Egyptian and Assyrian; Roman and Grecian; Italian Renaissance and Medieval; Elizabethan and Georgian; and Pompadourian and Victorian.
More images	Seven Dials Monument	Seven Dials 51.5138°N 0.1270°W	1988–1989	—N/a	Andrew ("Red") Mason after Edward Pierce	Column	—N/a	Unveiled 29 June 1989 by Queen Beatrix of the Netherlands, as part of the celebrations for the tercentenary of William III and Mary II's accession. The original Sundial Pillar was erected by Thomas Neale in the early 1690s; it was pulled down in 1773 in order to deter "undesirables" from congregating around it.
More images	ob 08	Central Saint Giles, St Giles High Street 51.5158°N 0.1280°W	2008	Steven Gontarski	—N/a	Sculpture	—N/a	The bright red abstract sculpture, which stands 5 metres high, is made of painted and lacquered glass-fibre-reinforced plastic. Gontarski wished to "create a heart in the midst of an urban development".
	William	Central Saint Giles, St Giles High Street 51.5158°N 0.1273°W	2010	Rebecca Warren	—N/a	Sculpture	—N/a	Adapted from a smaller work by the sculptor also titled William. The fluid, anonymous figure is intended to "speak of the ever-shifting present" and not of the past, and thus have the opposite qualities to most public sculpture.
More images	Family: from another place	Action for Children headquarters, Great Queen Street 51.51598°N 0.12048°W	2010	David Worthington	—N/a	Sculpture	—N/a	Seven sculptures made from red Iranian travertine.

== Bibliography ==
- Bradley, Simon; Pevsner, Nikolaus (2003). London 6: Westminster. The Buildings of England. London and New Haven: Yale University Press. ISBN 978-0-300-09595-1.
- Ward-Jackson, Philip (2011). Public Sculpture of Historic Westminster: Volume 1. Public Sculpture of Britain. Vol. 14. Liverpool: Liverpool University Press. ISBN 978-1-84631-691-3.
