= Gontarski =

Gontarski is a surname. Notable people with the surname include:

- Steven Gontarski (born 1972), American sculptor
- S. E. Gontarski (born 1942), professor of English at Florida State University
