= New Compton Street =

Street in the West End of London

Coordinates: 51°30′53.54″N 0°7′39.87″W

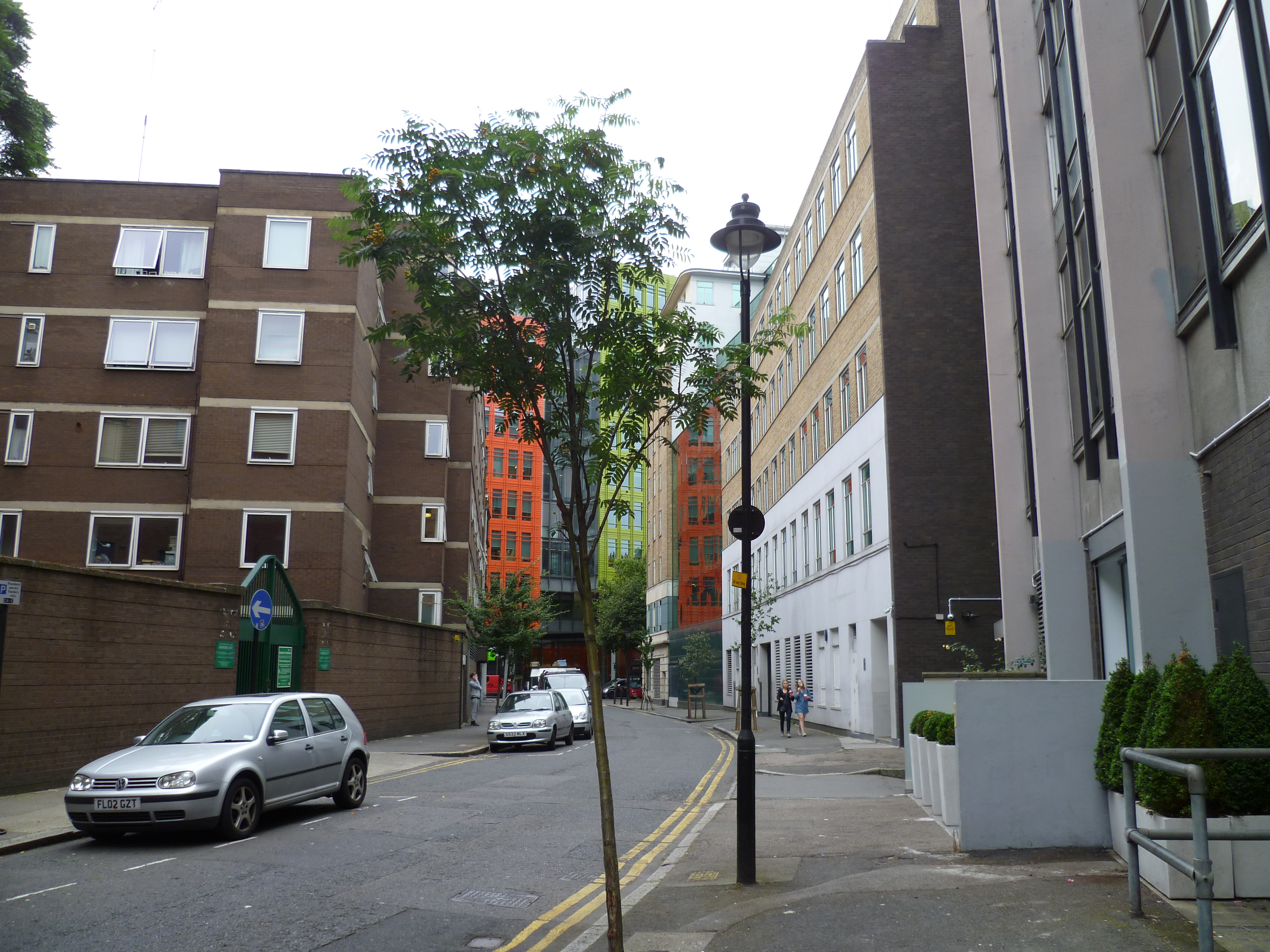
New Compton Street looking towards St Giles High Street.

New Compton Street is a street in the London Borough of Camden that runs from Stacey Street in the south to St Giles High Street in the north. It is crossed only by St Giles Passage. At its southern end, on the western side, is the Phoenix Garden and the rear of the Odeon Covent Garden cinema, formerly the Saville Theatre, on the other side of the street.

== See also ==
- Old Compton Street
