= Agatha Christie Memorial =

Memorial in Covent Garden, London

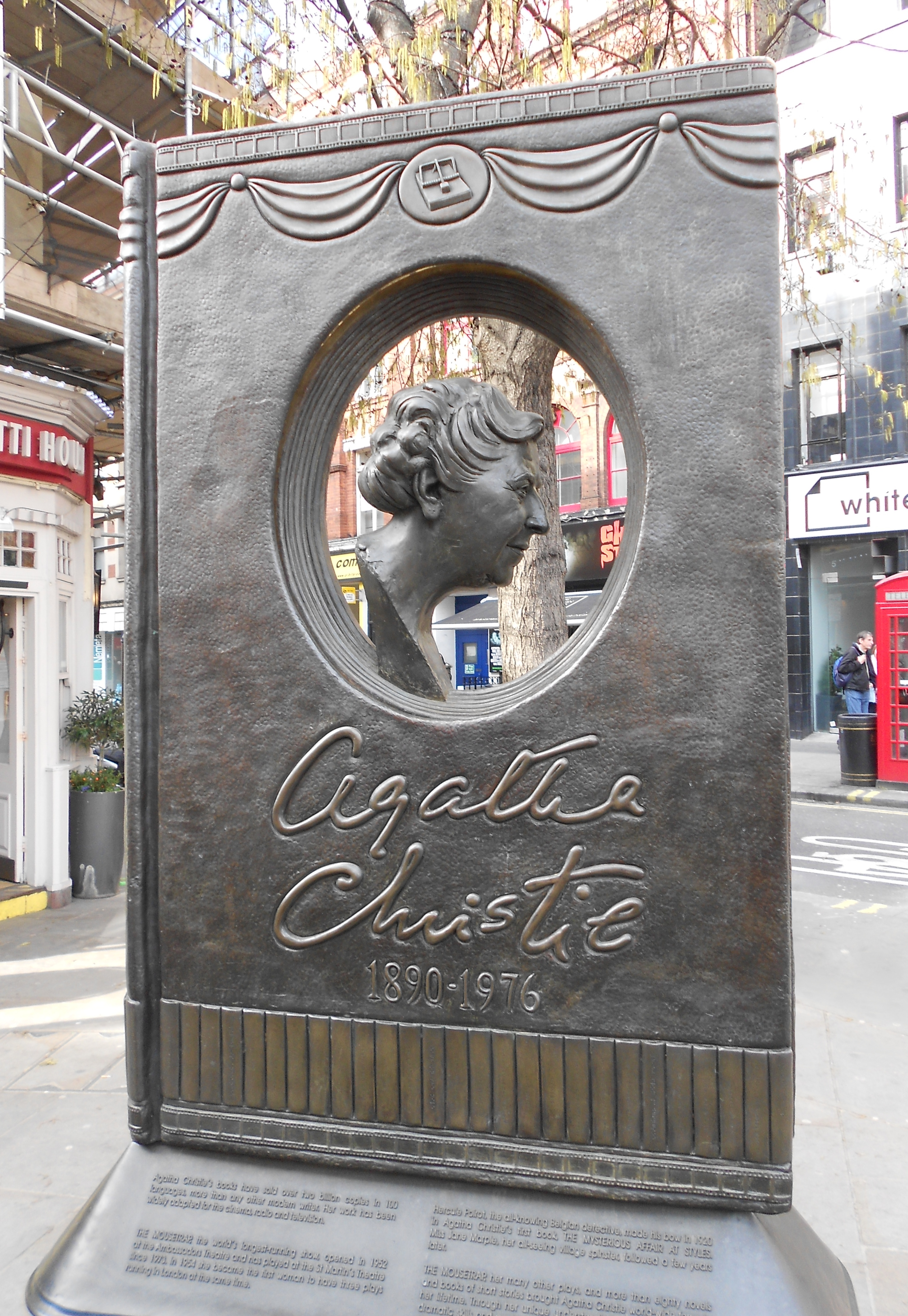
- The memorial in 2013
- Artist: Ben Twiston-Davies
- Year: 2012
- Medium: Bronze
- Subject: Agatha Christie
- Dimensions: 2.4 m (7.9 ft)
- Location: London; 51°30′42″N 0°07′39″W
- Website: Official website

The Agatha Christie Memorial is a memorial to author and playwright Agatha Christie, located at the intersection of Cranbourn Street and Great Newport Street by St Martin's Cross near Covent Garden, in London, United Kingdom.

== Description and history ==
The memorial is located in the heart of London's theatre district. This was chosen to pay homage to Christie's contribution to theatre: her 1952 murder mystery play The Mousetrap is the world's longest-running show, and she was the first female playwright to have three plays performing simultaneously in the West End.

The memorial depicts a book with Christie at its centre. It is about 2.4 metres high and made of bronze. It is lit from below as well as from within. An inscription on the front reads: Agatha / Christie / 1890–1976. It was designed by sculptor Ben Twiston-Davies.

The idea to create this memorial was conceived and implemented by Christie's grandson Mathew Prichard together with Sir Stephen Waley-Cohen, producer of The Mousetrap since 1994. Westminster City Council gave formal consent and offered advice on its construction. Although a bust of Christie had already been erected in Torquay, Devon, this was the first memorial to be erected in London, according to Twiston-Davies. The memorial was unveiled on 25 November 2012, to commemorate the 60th anniversary of The Mousetrap.

On the memorial appear some titles of her most popular books and plays, in English, and in some of the many languages into which Christie's work has been translated. The titles included were chosen in a competition among her fans. The details of the inscriptions can be seen on the official website.

== See also ==
- List of public art in Covent Garden
