= Stacey Street, London =

Street in London

Coordinates: 51°30′51.68″N 0°7′43.18″W

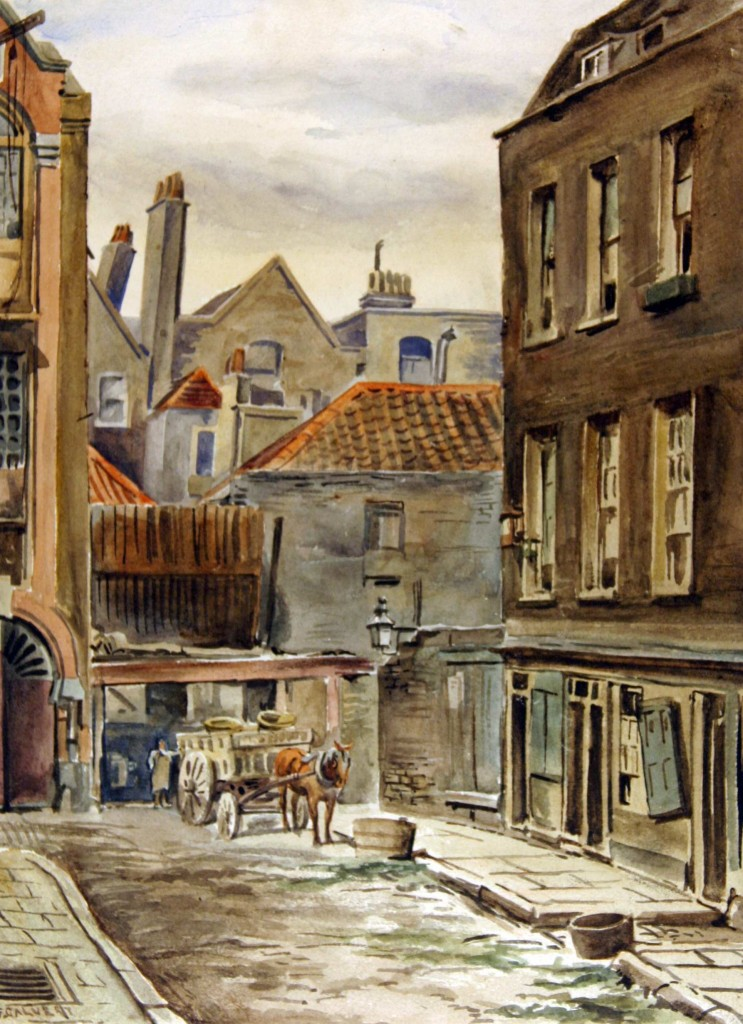
Stacey Street by F. Calvert. Watercolour, 1886.

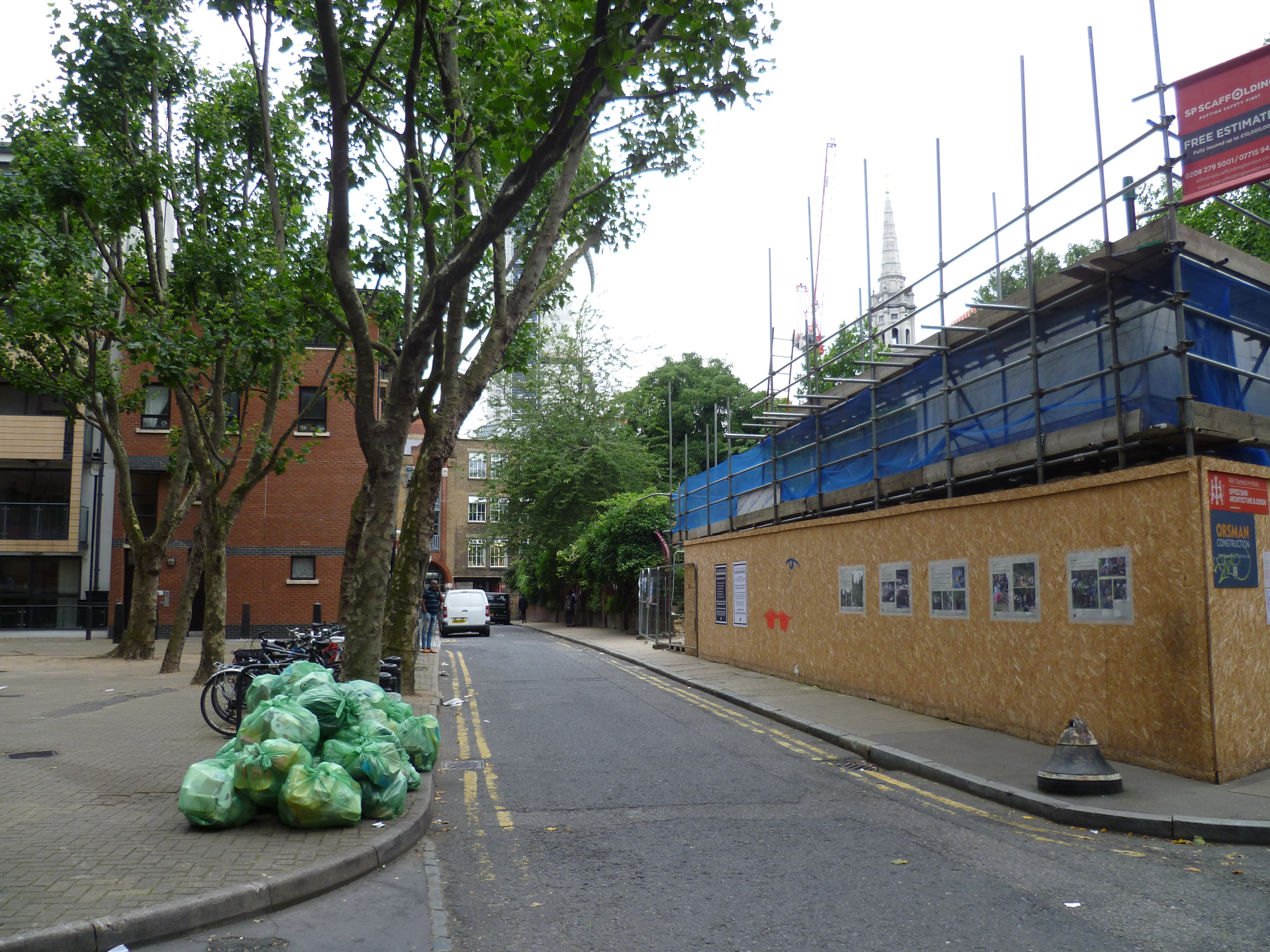
Stacey Street looking north.

Stacey Street is a street in the London Borough of Camden that runs from Shaftesbury Avenue in the south to Flitcroft Street in the north. It is joined on its east side by New Compton Street and on its west side by Phoenix Street which gave its name to the Phoenix Garden on the east side of Stacey Street.
