= St Giles, London =

Area in London, England

Coordinates: 51.5143°N 0.1270°W

St Giles
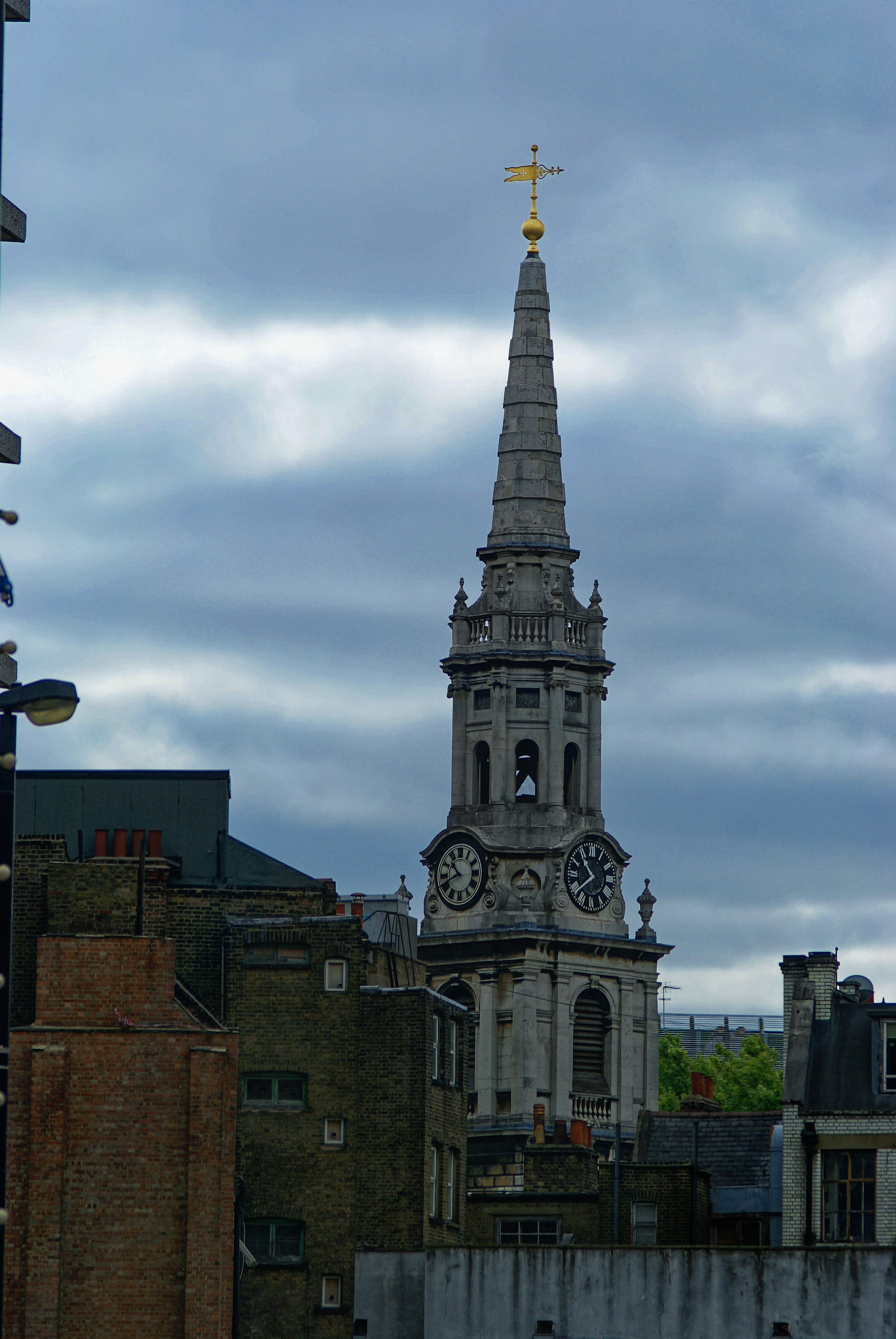
- The parish church of St Giles in the Fields

- Location within Greater London
- OS grid reference: TQ300811
  - Charing Cross: 0.5 mi (0.8 km) S
- London borough: Camden
- Ceremonial county: Greater London
- Region: London
- Country: England
- Sovereign state: United Kingdom
- Post town: LONDON
- Postcode district: WC1, WC2
- Dialling code: 020
- Police: Metropolitan
- Fire: London
- Ambulance: London
- UK Parliament: Holborn and St Pancras
- London Assembly: Barnet and Camden

St Giles is an area in London, England and is located in the London Borough of Camden. It is in Central London and part of the West End. The area gets its name from the parish church of St Giles in the Fields. The combined parishes of St Giles in the Fields and St George Bloomsbury (which was carved out of the former) were administered jointly for many centuries, leading to the conflation of the two, with much or all of St Giles usually taken to be a part of Bloomsbury. Points of interest include the church of St Giles in the Fields, Seven Dials, the Phoenix Garden, and St Giles Circus.

== History ==
There has been a church at St Giles since Saxon times, located beside a major highway.

The hospital of St Giles, recorded c. 1120 as Hospitali Sancti Egidii extra Londonium was founded, together with a monastery and a chapel, by Queen Matilda, wife of Henry I. St Giles (c. 650 – c. 710) was the patron saint of lepers and the hospital was home to a leper colony, the site chosen for its surrounding fields and marshes separating contagion from nearby London. Peter Ackroyd argues that the character of vagrancy has never left the area. A village accreted to cater to the brethren and patients.

The crossroads which is now St Giles Circus, where Oxford Street, Charing Cross Road, Tottenham Court Road, and New Oxford St meet, was the site of a gallows until the fifteenth century. The Lollard leader Sir John Oldcastle was hanged, and he and his gallows were burnt, there. Grape Street, in the heart of the St Giles district, runs beside the site of the hospital's vineyard.

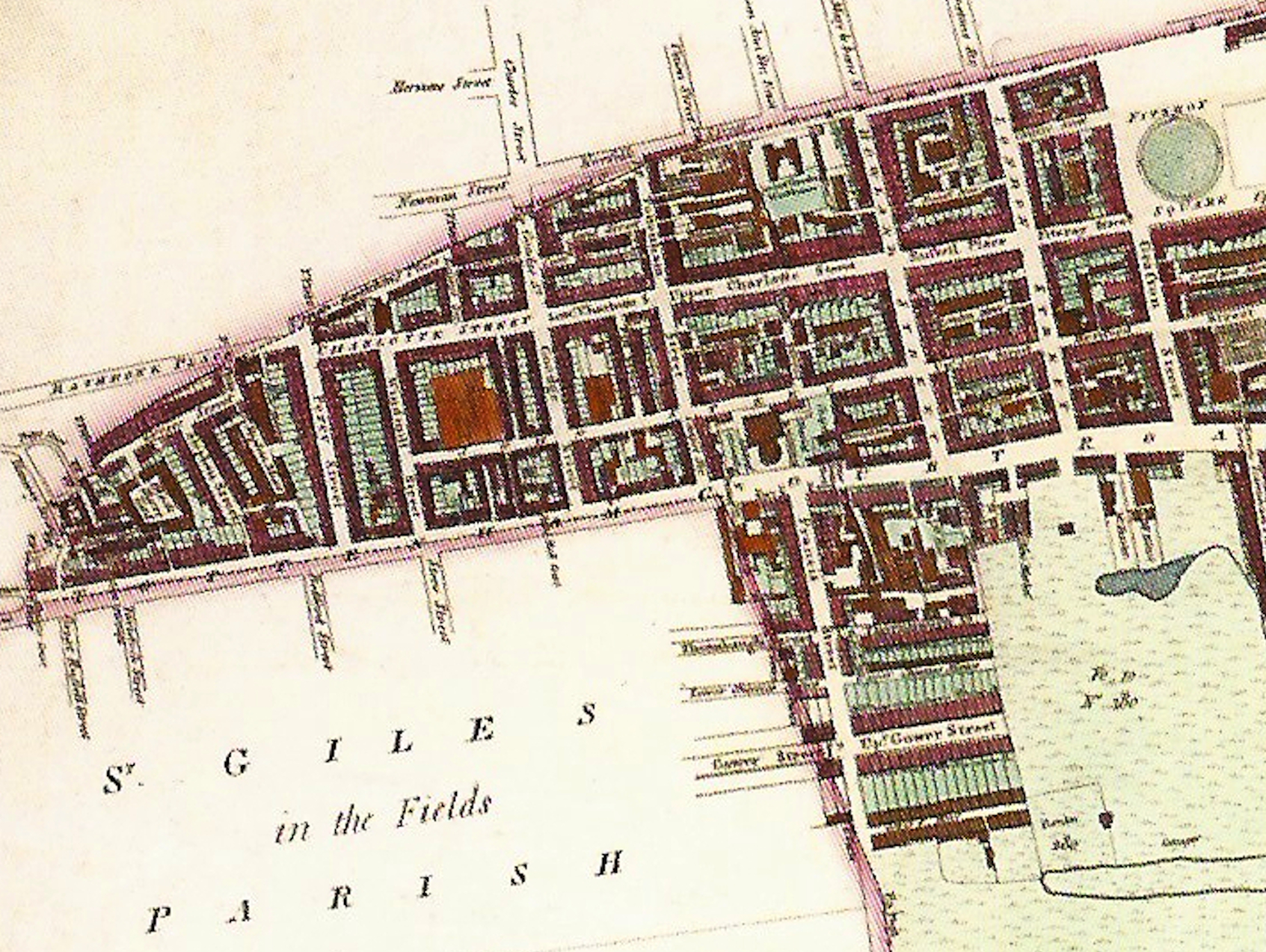
The south-west of the parish of St Pancras, showing boundary with Giles in the Fields, 1804: Tottenham Court Road to the west and Francis street (now Torrington Place) to the north

The monastery was dissolved during the Reformation and a parish church created from the chapel. The hospital continued to care for lepers until the mid-sixteenth century, when the disease abated and the hospital instead began to care for indigents. The parish was known as St Giles in the Fields and it is recorded in 1563 as Seynt Gyles in the Field. The first post-Catholic parish church was built in 1631 and from the mid-seventeenth century church wardens note "a great influx of poor people into this parish". The cellars in particular were already recorded as horrific places in which whole families resided, "damp and unwholesome" as the village was built on marshland. The Drury Lane Paving Act 1605 (3 Jas. 1. c. 22) had condemned the area as "deepe foul and dangerous". Vagrants expelled from the city settled in the St Giles district known for the generous charitable relief of the parish. Irish and French refugees were drawn to the area as well as "St Giles blackbirds", black servants reduced to begging.

The 1665 Great Plague started in St Giles and the first victims were buried in the St Giles churchyard. By September 1665, 8,000 people were dying a week in London. By the end of the plague year there were 3,216 listed plague deaths in St Giles parish, which had fewer than 2,000 households. After the Restoration, the area was populated by Huguenot refugees who had fled persecution and established themselves as tradesmen and artisans, particularly in weaving and the silk trade.

The southern area of the parish, around present day Shaftesbury Avenue, was a wasteland named Cock and Pye Fields. Houses were not built there until 1666, after the Great Fire, and not fully developed until 1693, becoming known as Seven Dials. Thomas Neale built much of the area, giving his name to Neal Street and Neal's Yard. St Giles and Seven Dials became known for their astrologers and alchemists, an association which lasts to this day. The village of St Giles stood on the main road from Holborn to Tyburn, a place of local execution. Convicted criminals were often allowed, in tradition, to stop at St Giles en route to Tyburn for a final drink – a "St Giles Bowl" – before hanging.

=== The rookery ===
The rookery originally stood on a five-acre plot in the north west of the parish, bounded by Great Russell Street in the north, Tottenham Court Road in the west, St Giles High Street in the south, and Dyott Street in the east. The Centrepoint homeless charity and Google now have their offices on the site. Originally, it was a plot of land owned by the Bainbridge family who installed roads and leased plots to individual developers in the late 17th century, many of whom put up high density lodging houses. The area had fallen into disrepair by the 18th century, made worse by debts held by the landowner at the time, and by long leases held by developers who had no incentive to improve the houses they had built decades earlier.

It was regarded as one of the worst slums within Britain, often described as a site of overcrowding and squalor, a semi-derelict warren. It was known for having a large Irish Catholic population, and took on a number of nicknames including "Little Ireland" and "The Holy Land". As London grew in the 18th and 19th centuries, so did the parish's population, rising to 30,000 by 1831. Irish migrants escaping the Great Famine (Ireland) during 1845 and 1849 were a significant source of new inhabitants in the parish. The expression "a St Giles cellar" passed into common parlance, describing the worst conditions of poverty. Open sewers often ran through rooms and cesspits were left untended. Residents complained to the Times in 1849: "We live in muck and filth. We aint got no priviz, no dust bins, no drains, no water-splies, and no drain or suer in the hole place". The rookery was a maze of gin shops, prostitutes' hovels and secret alleyways that police had little hope of navigating. William Hogarth, Thomas Rowlandson, and Gustave Doré, among others, drew the area, as did novelists Henry Fielding and Charles Dickens. Romance novelists Elizabeth Hoyt and Erica Monroe wrote about it extensively in their Maiden Lane and Rookery Rogues series, respectively. Peter Ackroyd writes "The Rookeries embodied the worst living conditions in all of London's history; this was the lowest point which human beings could reach".

Reformer Henry Mayhew described the slum in 1860 in A Visit to the Rookery of St Giles and its Neighbourhood:

The parish of St. Giles, with its nests of close and narrow alleys and courts inhabited by the lowest class of Irish costermongers, has passed into a byword as the synonym of filth and squalor. And although New Oxford Street has been carried straight through the middle of the worst part of its slums—"the Rookery"—yet, especially on the south side, there still are streets which demand to be swept away in the interest of health and cleanliness... They [are] a noisy and riotous lot, fond of street brawls, equally "fat, ragged and saucy"; and the courts abound in pedlars, fish-women, newscriers, and corn-cutters.

Due to the high mortality rate, especially from cholera and tuberculosis, the graveyard ran out of space. During the eighteenth and nineteenth centuries, many were buried in the cemeteries surrounding St Pancras.

From the 1830s to the 1870s plans were developed to demolish the slum as part of London wide clearances for improved transport routes, sanitation and the expansion of the railways. New Oxford Street was driven through the slum to join the areas of Oxford Street and Holborn. This had the effect of pushing the slum further south, into the Seven Dials, which fell into further decline. The unchanging character of the area, failing investment schemes and inability to sell new properties ensured that plans for wholesale clearance were stymied until the end of the century.

=== Local governance ===
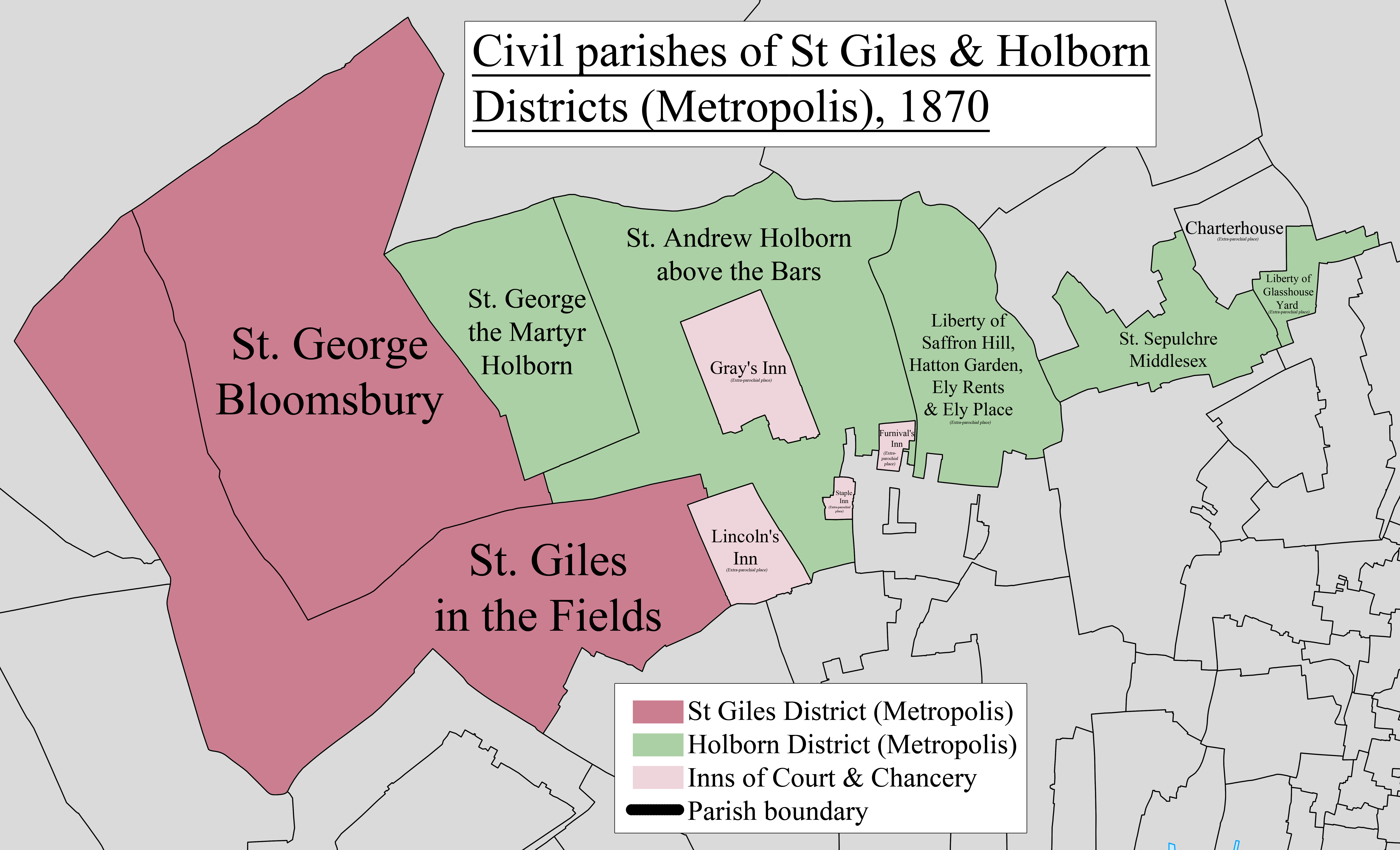
Civil parish of St Giles and the closely associated parish of Bloomsbury, 1870

Wards of the Metropolitan Borough of Holborn, 1952. St Giles (including most of Lincoln's Inn) was sub-divided but retained its identity.

The area appears to have been a part of the parish of Holborn when St Giles hospital was established in the early 1100s.

The date when the Ancient Parish of St Giles was formed is not clear. Some sources indicate that the parish was in place before 1222 while others suggest 1547. From 1597 onwards, English parishes were obliged to take on a civil as well as ecclesiastical role, starting with the relief of the poor.

The parish formed part of the Ossulstone hundred of Middlesex. The parish of St George Bloomsbury was split off in 1731, but the parishes were combined for civil purposes in 1774 and used for the administration of the Poor Law after the Poor Law Amendment Act 1834. George Buchanan was appointed Health Officer for the parish around 1856. Upon the creation of the Metropolitan Board of Works in 1855 the combined parishes became the St Giles District and were transferred to the County of London in 1889.

The St Giles parish was an elongated "L" shape, stretching from Torrington Place in the north to Shelton Street in the south and then east to include Lincoln's Inn Fields. For registration, and therefore census reporting, the civil parish was divided in North and South districts, with Monmouth Street broadly forming the division. The length of St Giles High Street is identical to the width of the parish at that point. The parish of St George Bloomsbury was located to the northeast. In 1881 the population of St Giles North was 13,837 and St Giles South was 14,864.

The local government of London was reorganised in 1900 and St Giles became part of the Metropolitan Borough of Holborn. Since 1965 it has been part of the London Borough of Camden.

== Street name etymologies ==
St Giles has no formally defined boundaries – those utilised here form a rough triangle: New Oxford Street to the north, Shaftesbury Avenue to the south-east and Charing Cross Road to the west.

- Brook Mews
- Bucknall Street – after either Arabella Bucknall (or Bucknell), mother of John Hanmer, 1st Baron Hanmer who owned this land in the 19th century, or Ralph Bucknall, local 17th - 18th century vestryman
- Cambridge Circus – after Prince George, 2nd Duke of Cambridge, who formally opened the new development of Charing Cross Road in 1887
- Charing Cross Road – built 1887, and named as it led to the cross at Charing, from the Old English word "cierring", referring to a bend in the River Thames
- Denmark Place and Denmark Street – after Prince George of Denmark, husband of Queen Anne
- Dyott Street – after either Simon Dyott, local resident in the 17th century, or Jane Dyott, daughter of local landowner Henry Bainbridge
- Earnshaw Street – after Thomas Earnshaw, noted watchmaker of the 18th-19th century, who worked near here
- Flitcroft Street – after Henry Flitcroft, architect of St Giles in the Fields church
- New Compton Street – as with Old Compton Street which extends to the west, it is believed to be named after Henry Compton, Bishop of London in the 1670s
- New Oxford Street – built as an extension of Oxford Street in 1845-47
- Phoenix Street – named after an inn that formerly stood near here
- Princes Circus
- St Giles Circus, St Giles High Street and St Giles Passage – after St Giles Hospital, a leper hospital founded by Matilda of Scotland, wife of Henry I in 1117. St Giles was an 8th-century hermit in Provence who was crippled in a hunting accident and later became patron saint of cripples and lepers. Circus is a British term for a road junction, with several roads meeting and a central reservation or 'roundabout, the traffic passing in a one way system around the roundabout or 'circus'

- Shaftesbury Avenue – after Anthony Ashley Cooper, 7th Earl of Shaftesbury, Victorian politician and philanthropist
- Stacey Street – after John Stacey, local landowner in the 16th century

== Hogarth depictions of St Giles ==
=== Four Times of the Day ===
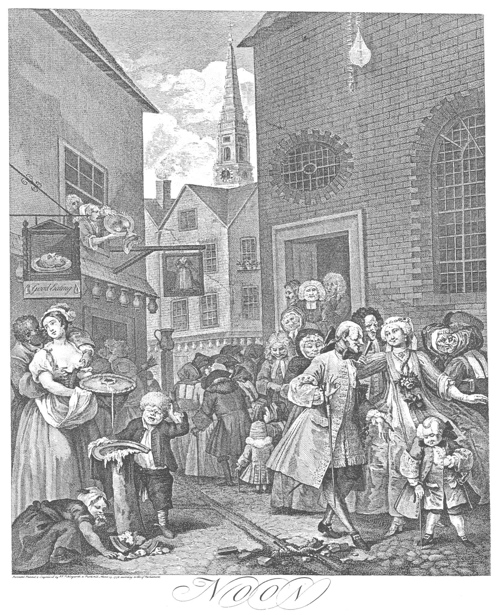
Hogarth's "Noon" from Four Times of the Day, showing St Giles church in the background

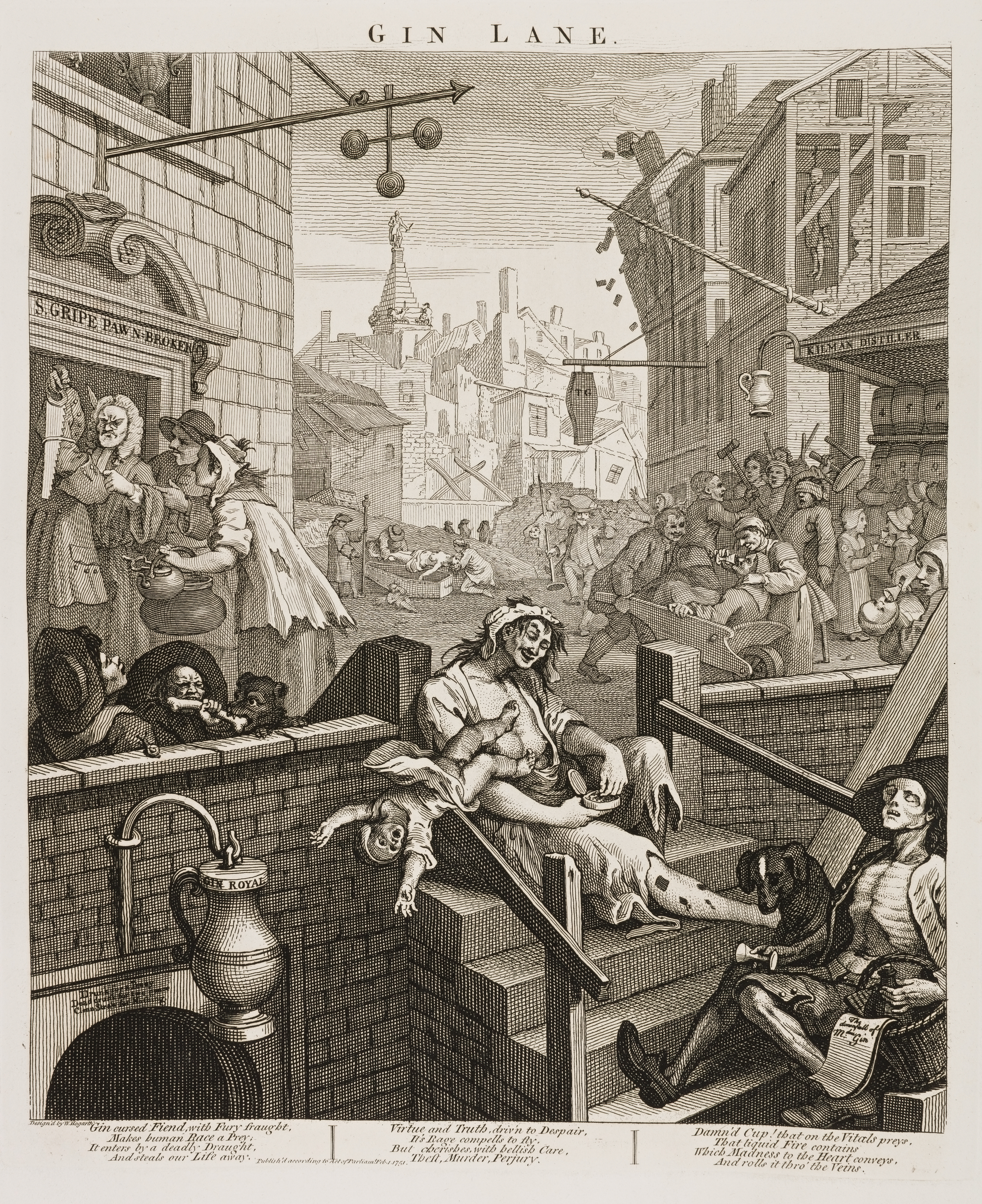
Gin Lane by William Hogarth (1751)

The etching "Noon" from Four Times of the Day by Hogarth takes place in Hog Lane, with the church of St Giles in the Fields in the background. Hogarth would feature St Giles again as the background of Gin Lane and First Stage of Cruelty. The picture shows the Huguenot refugees who arrived in the 1680s and established themselves in the silk trade; Hogarth contrasts their fussiness and high fashion with the slovenliness of the group on the other side of the road; the rotting corpse of a cat that has been stoned to death lying in the gutter that divides the street is the only thing the two sides have in common. The older members of the congregation wear traditional dress, while the younger members wear the fashions of the day. The children are dressed up as adults: the boy in the foreground struts around in his finery while the boy with his back to the viewer has his hair in a net, bagged up in the "French" style. At the far right, a black man, probably a freed slave, fondles the breasts of a woman, distracting her from her work, her pie-dish "tottering like her virtue". In front of the couple, a boy has set down his pie to rest, but the plate has broken, spilling the pie onto the ground where it is being rapidly consumed by an urchin.

=== Gin Lane ===
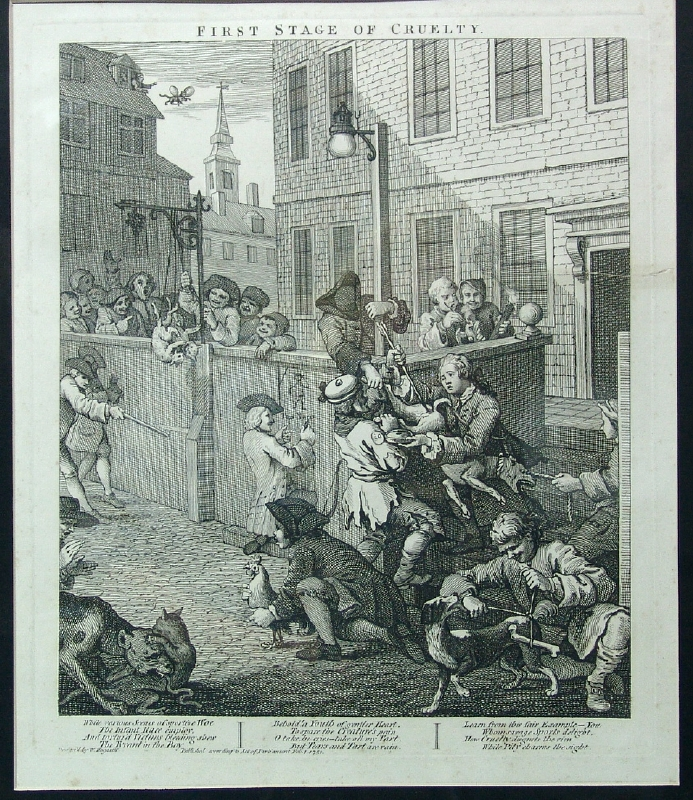
First stage of cruelty (Plate I), Hogarth etching (1751)

Set in St Giles, Gin Lane depicts the squalor and despair of a community raised on gin. The only businesses that flourish are those which serve the gin industry: gin sellers; distillers; the pawnbroker where the avaricious Mr. Gripe greedily takes the vital possessions (the carpenter offers his saw and the housewife her cooking utensils) of the alcoholic residents of the street in return for a few pennies to feed their habit; and the undertaker, for whom Hogarth implies at least a handful of new customers from this scene alone. Most shockingly, the focus of the picture is a woman in the foreground, who, addled by gin and driven to prostitution by her habit —as evidenced by the syphilitic sores on her legs— lets her baby slip unheeded from her arms and plunge to its death in the stairwell of the gin cellar below. Half-naked, she has no concern for anything other than a pinch of snuff. This mother was not such an exaggeration as she might appear: in 1734, Judith Dufour reclaimed her two-year-old child from the workhouse where it had been given a new set of clothes; she then strangled it and left the infant's body in a ditch so that she could sell the clothes (for 1s. 4d.) to buy gin. In another case, an elderly woman, Mary Estwick, let a toddler burn to death while she slept in a gin-induced stupor. Other images of despair and madness fill the scene: a lunatic cavorts in the street beating himself over the head with a pair of bellows while holding a baby impaled on a spike—the dead child's frantic mother rushes from the house screaming in horror; a barber has taken his own life in the dilapidated attic of his barber-shop, ruined because nobody can afford a haircut or shave; on the steps, below the woman who has let her baby fall, a skeletal pamphlet-seller rests, perhaps dead of starvation, as the unsold moralising pamphlet on the evils of gin-drinking, The Downfall of Mrs Gin, slips from his basket.

=== First stage of cruelty ===
Set in St Giles, the etching shows a boy, Nero, is being assisted by other boys torturing a dog by inserting an arrow into its rectum. An initialled badge on the shoulder of his light-hued and ragged coat shows him to be a pupil of the charity school of the parish of St Giles. A more tender-hearted boy, perhaps the dog's owner, pleads with Nero to stop tormenting the frightened animal, even offering food in an attempt to appease him.

== Modern governance ==
St Giles is split between the electoral wards of Bloomsbury and Holborn and Covent Garden in the London Borough of Camden. With some sections of Holborn and Bloomsbury it forms part of the Central District Alliance business improvement district. It is within the Holborn and St Pancras Parliament constituency and the Barnet and Camden London Assembly constituency.

== Tottenham Court Road tube station ==
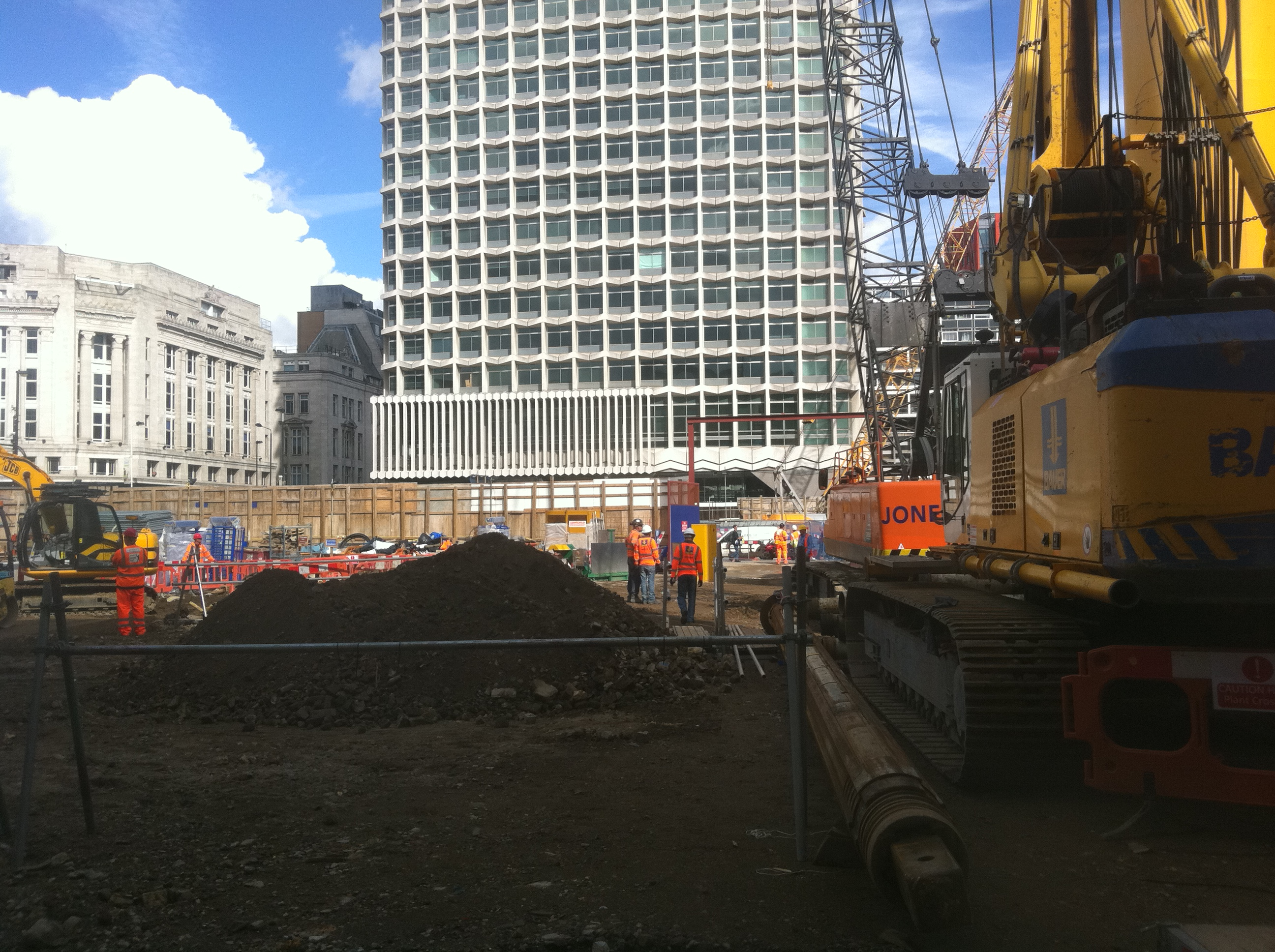
St Giles Crossrail reconstruction, September 2010

The Central London Railway (CLR) opened Tottenham Court Tube Station, between the Church of St Giles in the Fields and St Giles Circus, on 30 July 1900. Tottenham Court Road underwent improvements in the early 1930s to replace lifts with escalators. The station had four entrances to the sub-surface ticket hall from the north-east, south-west and north-west corners of St Giles Circus and from a subway beneath the Centrepoint building which starts on Andrew Borde Street. The entrances were frequently congested leading to occasions during peak periods of the day when they were briefly closed to prevent overcrowding in the station.

In 2009, Transport for London began a major reconstruction of large parts of the station. Much of the St Giles area alongside St Giles High Street has been cleared to make way for the new development including Crossrail expansion. The Astoria theatre on Charing Cross Road has been demolished and the original Central line entrances will also go.

== See also ==
- Church of St Giles in the Fields
- St Giles Circus
- St Giles District (Metropolis)
- Central Saint Giles
- The Phoenix Garden
