= Central Saint Giles =

Residential complex in London

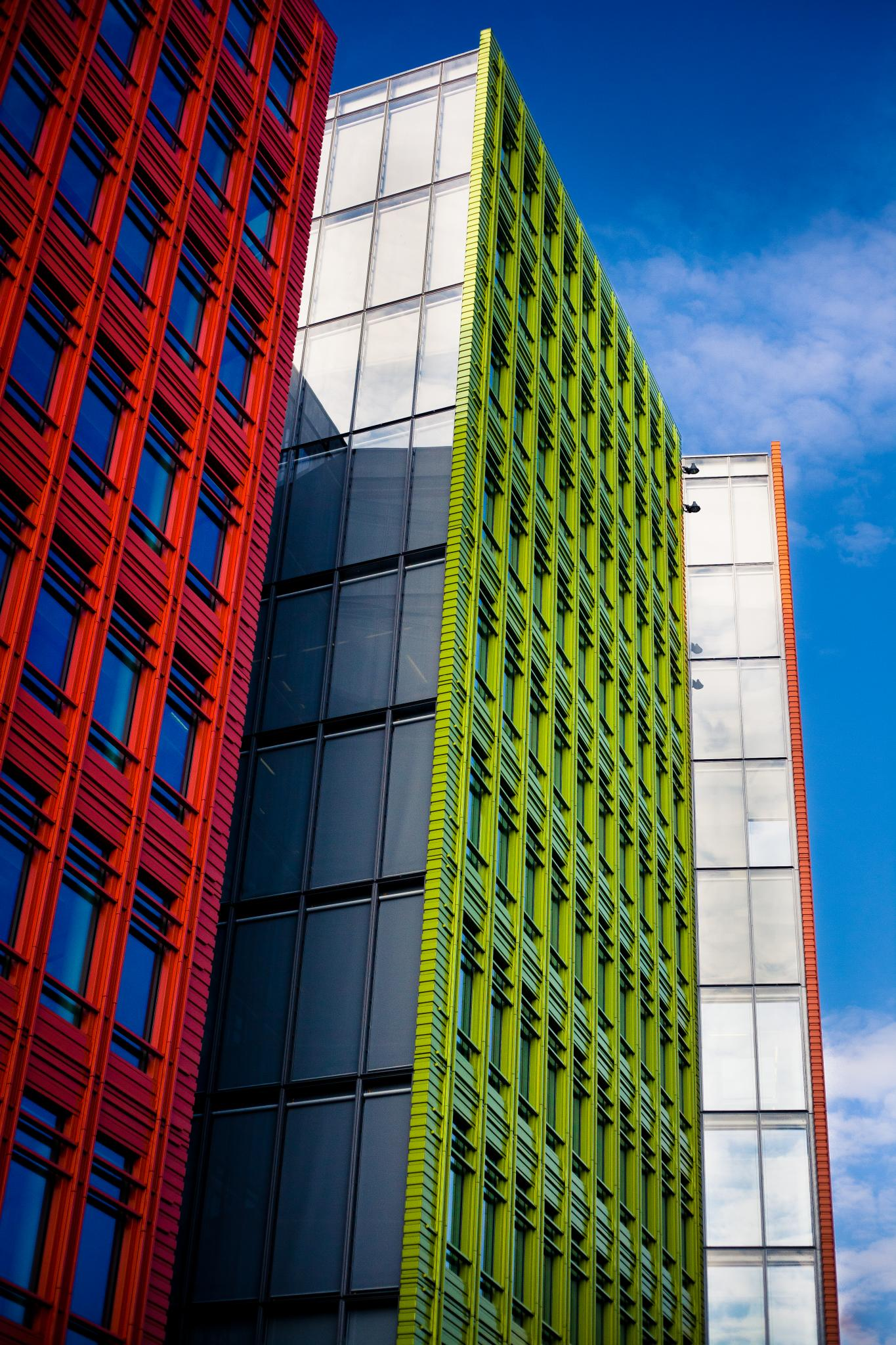
- South façade of Central Saint Giles

- Location within Greater London

General information
- Status: Completed
- Type: Mixed-use development
- Location: 1–13 St Giles High Street, Camden, London, UK
- Coordinates: 51.516014°N 0.127738°W
- Current tenants: Burson-Marsteller, Google, Mindshare, NBC Universal, King.com
- Completed: May 2010
- Cost: £450 million
- Client: Legal & General
- Owner: Google (since 2022)

Technical details
- Floor count: 11 (office block); 15 (residential block)
- Floor area: 66,090 m²
- Lifts/elevators: 12 passenger, 4 fire fighting, 3 goods, 2 car

Design and construction
- Architect: Renzo Piano
- Architecture firm: Renzo Piano Building Workshop
- Structural engineer: Ove Arup & Partners

Website
- http://www.centralsaintgiles.com/

Central Saint Giles is a mixed-use development in central London. Built at a cost of £450 million and completed in May 2010, it was designed by the Italian architect Renzo Piano and is his first work in the UK. The development consists of two buildings of up to 15 storeys in height, arranged around a public courtyard lined with shops and restaurants. It is chiefly notable for its façades, covered with 134,000 glazed tiles in vivid shades: orange, red, lime green and a warm yellow. It has attracted a number of high-profile tenants including NBCUniversal, MindShare, and Google.

In January 2022, Google announced plans to purchase the entire building for $1 billion USD.

== Location and background ==
The development is in the district of St Giles, one block south-east of the east end of Oxford Street. The area was once notorious for being one of the worst slums in London, known as the Rookery – a maze of ramshackle houses, alleys and courtyards inhabited by thousands of destitute people. It was famously depicted by William Hogarth in his 1751 print Gin Lane. Central Saint Giles stands on the site of St Giles Court, an office development erected in the 1950s for the Ministry of Supply and latterly used by the Ministry of Defence (MOD). It consisted of a linked series of brick blocks, six to eight storeys high, arranged in an S-shape around two courtyards to which there was no public access. The grim appearance contributed to the area becoming a magnet for prostitutes and the homeless. The building was owned by Legal & General but was occupied by the MOD on a lease not due to expire until 2011. At the start of the 21st century the MOD made a large consolidation of offices so discontinued the use of several in the capital, including St Giles Court. It vacated the building in April 2005.

The site, a modest urban block, covers 1.75 acres (0.71 ha) bounded by shortened (by pedestrianisation) St Giles High Street, as well as by Earnshall, Bucknall and Dyott Streets and a brief frontage to Shaftesbury Avenue. Partly bounding the north is the 1960s Centre Point tower on New Oxford Street. To the south-west are the 18th-century church of St Giles-in-the-Fields and its churchyard, playground and public gardens forming the block's wholly pedestrianised link to Shaftesbury Avenue. An alike sized space, but a complex hardscaped plaza, stretches to the north west, "St Giles Square", to Tottenham Court Road station.

In 2002, Stanhope and Legal & General appointed the Renzo Piano Building Workshop as architects for an office and residential scheme to replace St Giles Court after its demolition. The St Giles area was subsequently identified by the then Mayor of London, Ken Livingstone, as an area for regeneration in his London Plan for the strategic development of the city. Livingstone envisaged St Giles as the site for a cluster of towers alongside the existing Centre Point tower, but this was opposed by Camden council. Although the site is not itself in a conservation area, it is surrounded by conservation areas and the council required the developers to ensure that any new building was in keeping with the height of the surrounding buildings.

Legal & General worked with the local community to secure support for the project, establishing the St Giles Renaissance Forum in 2002 as a focal point for local residents, community groups and stakeholders to collaborate on plans to regenerate St Giles. Plans for the development were unveiled in February 2004 and in January 2005 Legal & General made a planning application to begin construction. The scheme was opposed by a number of local residents' groups which complained that it would constitute an overdevelopment of the site, would put too much strain on local transport and that there was too little residential accommodation on the site.

Planning permission was granted by Camden council in July 2006 after changes were made to the planning application following a public consultation. The height of the development was reduced from the originally proposed 18 storeys. As part of the planning agreement, the developers reached a Section 106 agreement with the council to support improvements to the local area, including tree planting and the redevelopment of the street immediately to the east of the site.

Mitsubishi Estate Co. of Japan formed a joint venture with Legal & General in 2007 to fund the estimated £450 million cost of building Central Saint Giles. In addition to Stanhope acting as the development managers, Jones Lang LaSalle and Cushman & Wakefield are jointly acting as letting agents. Work on the new development began in the same year following the demolition of St Giles Court.

== Description of the development ==
Central Saint Giles provides 66,090 m^{2} of floor space – almost double that of the old St Giles Court – split between two separate buildings. The 15-storey west block is for residential use, providing 109 flats of which 53 are designated as affordable. The much larger horseshoe-shaped eastern block, standing 11 storeys high, encircles a publicly accessible courtyard comprising 27% of the site's area. It provides 37,625 m^{2} of office space with by far the largest floor plates of any office block in the West End of London, with 4,000 m^{2} on all but the top two floors. At ground level, 2,276 m^{2} of space is available for retail outlets and restaurants. The block is irregularly shaped with recesses, projections and roof terraces intended to make it look more interesting and to break up its bulk.

The development was built on a speculative basis on the assumption that the office space would be taken by a handful of major corporate tenants. Legal & General's commission urged Piano to avoid designing a "plain vanilla office building" and called for the new development to be "a fantastic place for people to work". As an incentive, it offered to pay an extra 10% above the normal going rate for London office developments. Piano decided to take the commission because, as he put it, "the client and the company involved were all about long lasting quality, without rushing. It is very difficult to do a job with somebody who has a short vision – in the end it never works."

Central Saint Giles
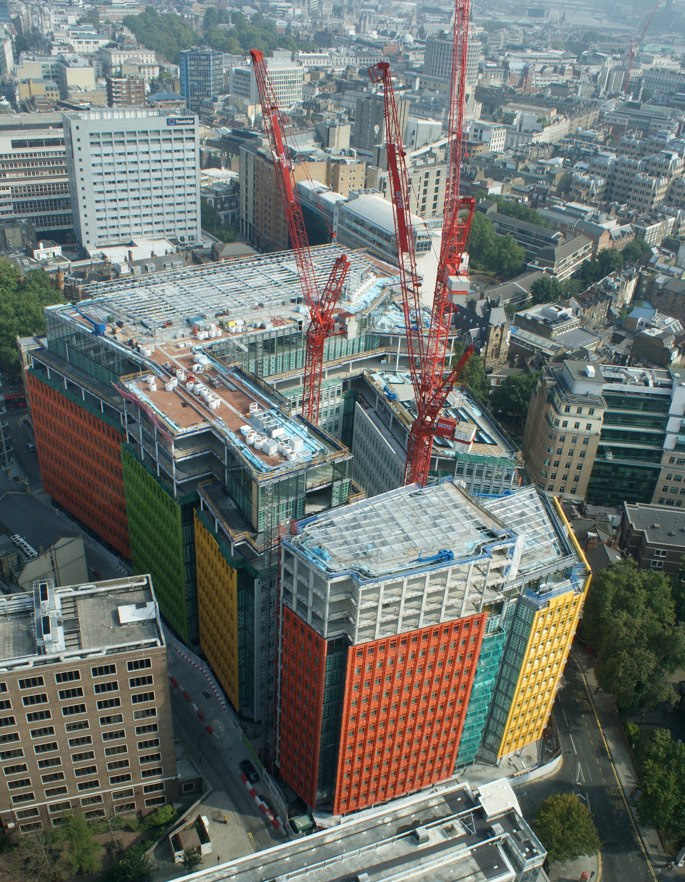
Central Saint Giles under construction in 2009

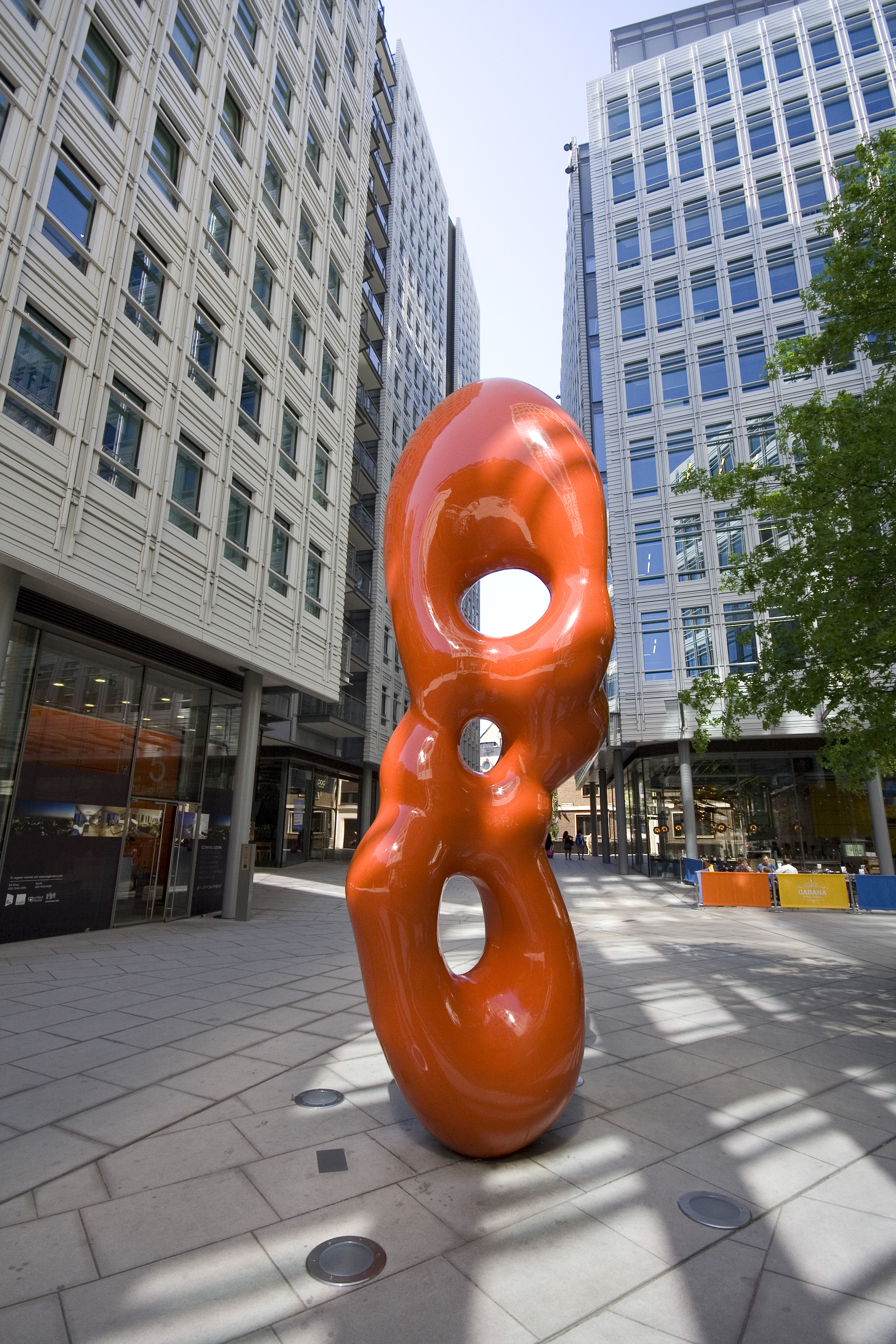
Interior courtyard of Central Saint Giles showing Steven Gontarski's sculpture Ob 8

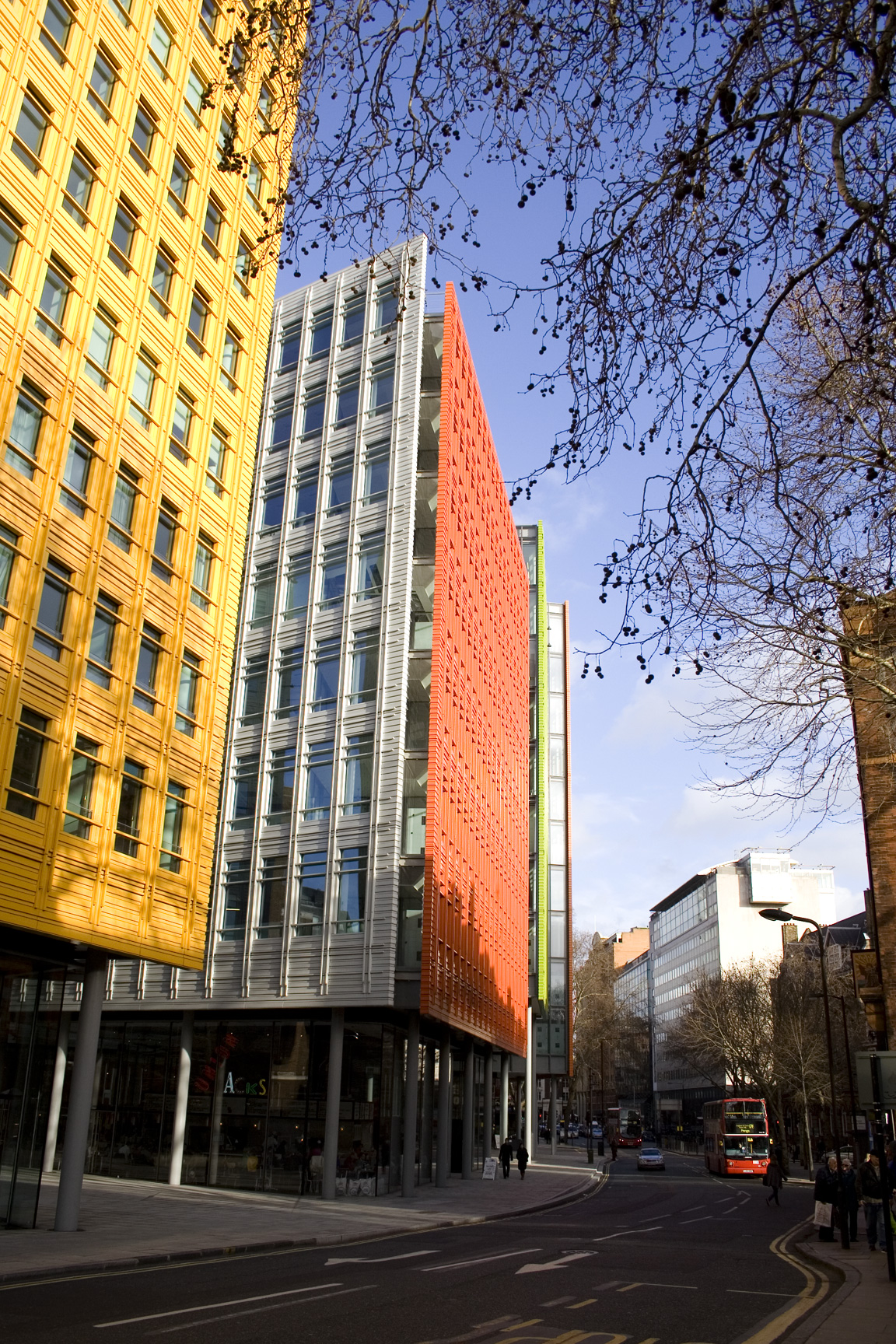
Central Saint Giles from St Giles High Street

At ground floor level, the bases of the buildings are open with concrete columns visible behind seven-metre-high ceiling-to-floor windows of low-iron glass, which offers greater transparency than normal glass. The courtyard plaza is ringed with eateries and shops, with two oak trees planted in the middle alongside art installations designed by the sculptors Steven Gontarski and Rebecca Warren.

The treatment of the upper floors provides a striking contrast. 134,000 green, orange, lime and yellow glazed terracotta tiles cover the façades in 13 irregularly oriented vertical panels on the external perimeter. The façades facing the inner courtyard are lined with another eight panels covered with grey tiles, a design which project architect Maurits van der Staay says was intended to "ensure that the upper storeys did not detract from the transparency of the ground floor and to maximise the amount of light reflected back into the offices." The façades are hung on an internal chassis carrier system (a similar system is in use in another Piano development on Berlin's Potsdamer Platz). Pierced by rows of identical windows repeated across the entire development, the façades are expected to be effectively self-cleaning and immune to fading. The colours of the façades are evoked in the design of many of the development's interior fittings, such as lift-door reveals, handrails and lift displays. The tiles were produced in Germany by NBK of Emmerich am Rhein and mounted on prefabricated façade units in Wrocław, Poland, by Schneider Fassadenbau.

The development has been designed with a number of features intended to reduce its environmental impact. It has received an "excellent" BREEAM rating on the basis of features that include 80% of the heating and hot water being provided by biomass boilers, while all of the water discharged from the cooling tower is collected for re-use in irrigation systems and the buildings' flushing toilets. Planted roof terraces laid out by the landscape designer Charles Funke are intended to absorb rainfall, thus reducing runoff, and contribute to biodiversity in the area. Only ten car parking spaces are available, at a cost of £100,000 each, due to the insistence of Camden council that the development should be largely car-free.

Piano has commented that he sought to "create a development that brings heart and soul into a forgotten part of Central London's urban fabric. A place that, by adding levitated, articulated and colourful buildings, physically expresses the people-focused and socially responsible credentials of modern corporate tenants." He has said that his design was intended to fragment the outline of the building to make it less imposing, and that the ceramic façades were inspired by the appearance of brick walls and the cases of guitars and drum kits in music shops in the vicinity. Explaining why he chose to make the building so colourful, he said: "The colour idea came from observing the sudden surprise given by brilliant colours in that part of the city. Cities should not be boring or repetitive. One of the reasons cities are so beautiful and a great idea, is that they are full of surprises, the idea of colour represents a joyful surprise." The decision to provide a publicly accessible central courtyard was made as a conscious repudiation of the closed architecture of the old St Giles Court, which Piano described as "a kind of fortress." He has said that the development's accessibility will make people warm to it: "As soon as people understand they can cross through the central courtyard, their attitude towards it will change; they will cross because it's a shortcut and it is also nicer."

The affordable housing units of the residential part of the development were bought by the Circle Anglia housing association. United House and Londonewcastle bought the remaining units which sold for prices of between £500,000 for studio flats to £5 million for the rooftop penthouse. Many are reported to have been sold to buyers from Hong Kong, Singapore and Malaysia seeking accommodation for visits to London and for their student children. The office element of the complex was fully let by the end of May 2011. As of August 2011, commercial tenants include NBC Universal, Google, Mindshare and Burson-Marsteller, and restaurants include Peyton & Byrne and Zizzi.

== Reactions ==
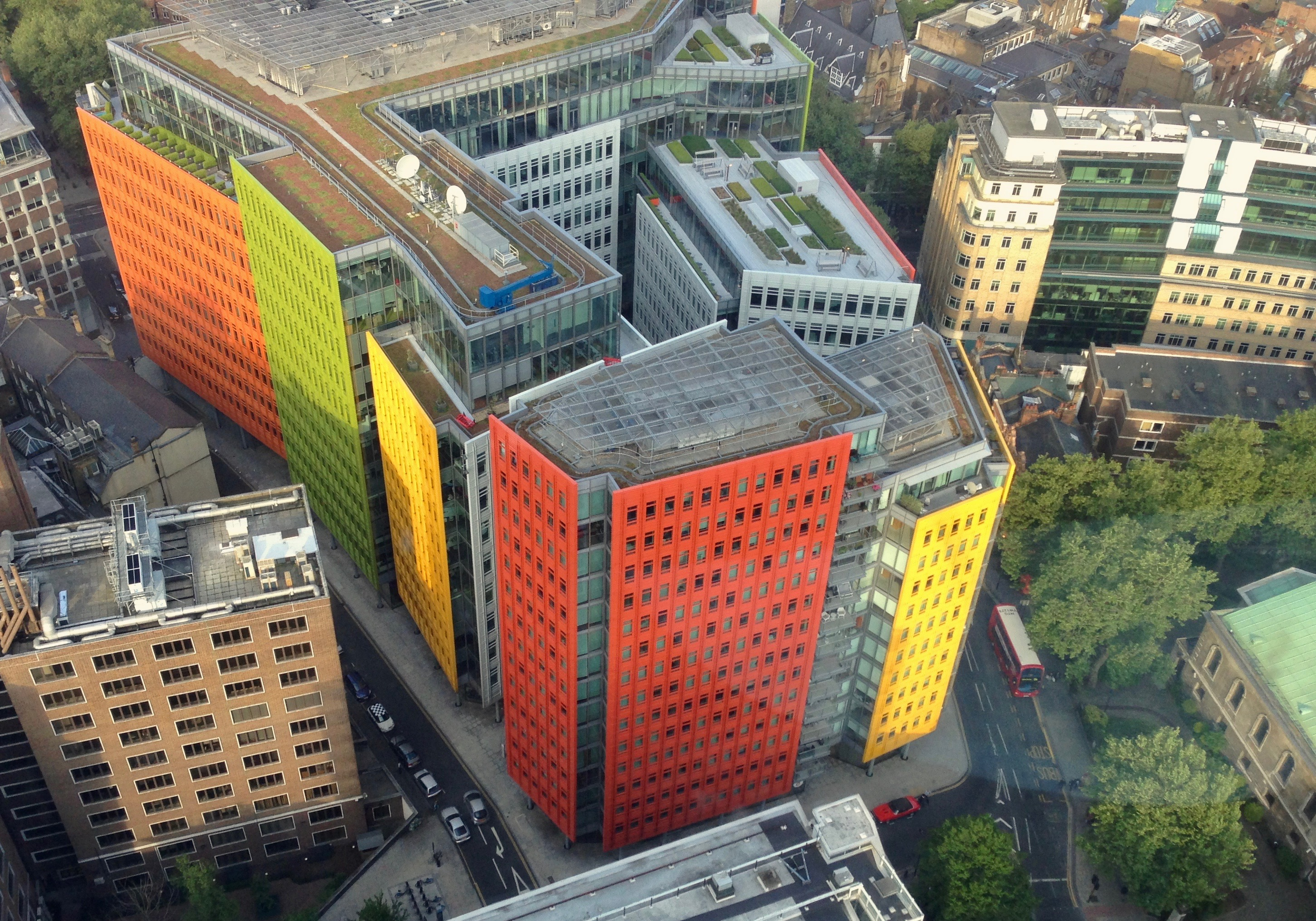
Aerial view of the London building (2013).

Architectural reviews, in 2010 and 2011, thus contemporary, were mixed.

The Observer's critic Rowan Moore called the development "a Marmite building ... which passers-by either hate or love". He compared it to "a B-movie ... in which giant mutant chewy sweets have, following a radioactive accident, invaded the world." Nonetheless, he rated Central Saint Giles as "one of the better" of the recent wave of commercial-civil developments in central London, calling it "dignified and refined, and the talk of transparency and openness is genuine." He praised the "beautiful precision" and complexity of the ceramic façade, citing its "depth and richness" and the "judgment in their precise tones". Ike Ijeh of Building opined that the striking colours of Central Saint Giles provided a "contrast with the traditional London grey/brown of the surrounding townscape [that] is both surreal and cinematic". He preferred less monotony or predictability to the scheme for the windows but he gave "a resounding and unequivocal yes" to the question of whether the development succeeded, commending it for its "skilful construction of a new urban identity for a forgotten area and the generosity of its ground level engagement with context."

Jay Merrick of The Independent called it the most "wilfully vivid" mixed-use building or set of buildings since Number 1 Poultry was built in the 1990s and noted the way that the "shouty polychromatic architecture"..."imprint[s] the vista with a bumptious, laser-etched precision." However, he expressed concern that the development would send the message that similar projects should convey "a false sense of worth" by being similarly dramatic. He criticised the way that the terracotta façades presented an overall effect that was "neither beautiful enough, nor surreal enough, to be truly remarkable", presenting an effect that was "striking but not resonant. Nothing about these façades lingers in the mind. They are, oddly, bereft of joie de vivre."

In Architecture Today, Neven Sidor commended the development's design for "reach[ing] out to its context at the same time as boldly asserting its own personality." He commented that "somehow colour therapy and fine terracotta modelling make the effect uplifting" and described the vistas from the central plaza as "a joy", praising the skill that had gone into the design. Piano's standing as an "international star" had, in Sidor's view, given the architect the clout to insist on the development's more unorthodox features and had been essential for such an ambitious complex to receive planning permission in the first place.

Ellis Woodman of Building Design, criticised the "lurid" appearance. He complained that "the site has been overdeveloped, to my mind, grotesquely so" and that its visual impact was "as shocking as that of any building realised in central London in 40 years". He was particularly critical of the way that the colourful upper-floor façades clashed with the use of lines of exposed columns at the ground level and called the site "a grim compromise between two fundamentally opposed ideas of how the capital might develop". On a more positive note, he praised the high quality of the office space and the spectacular views from the top floors and roof terrace.

== Awards ==
Central Saint Giles was nominated in November 2010 for the London Planning Awards under the Best New Place to Live category.
