= Phoenix Garden =

Community garden in London, England

Coordinates: 51°30′53″N 0°7′43″W

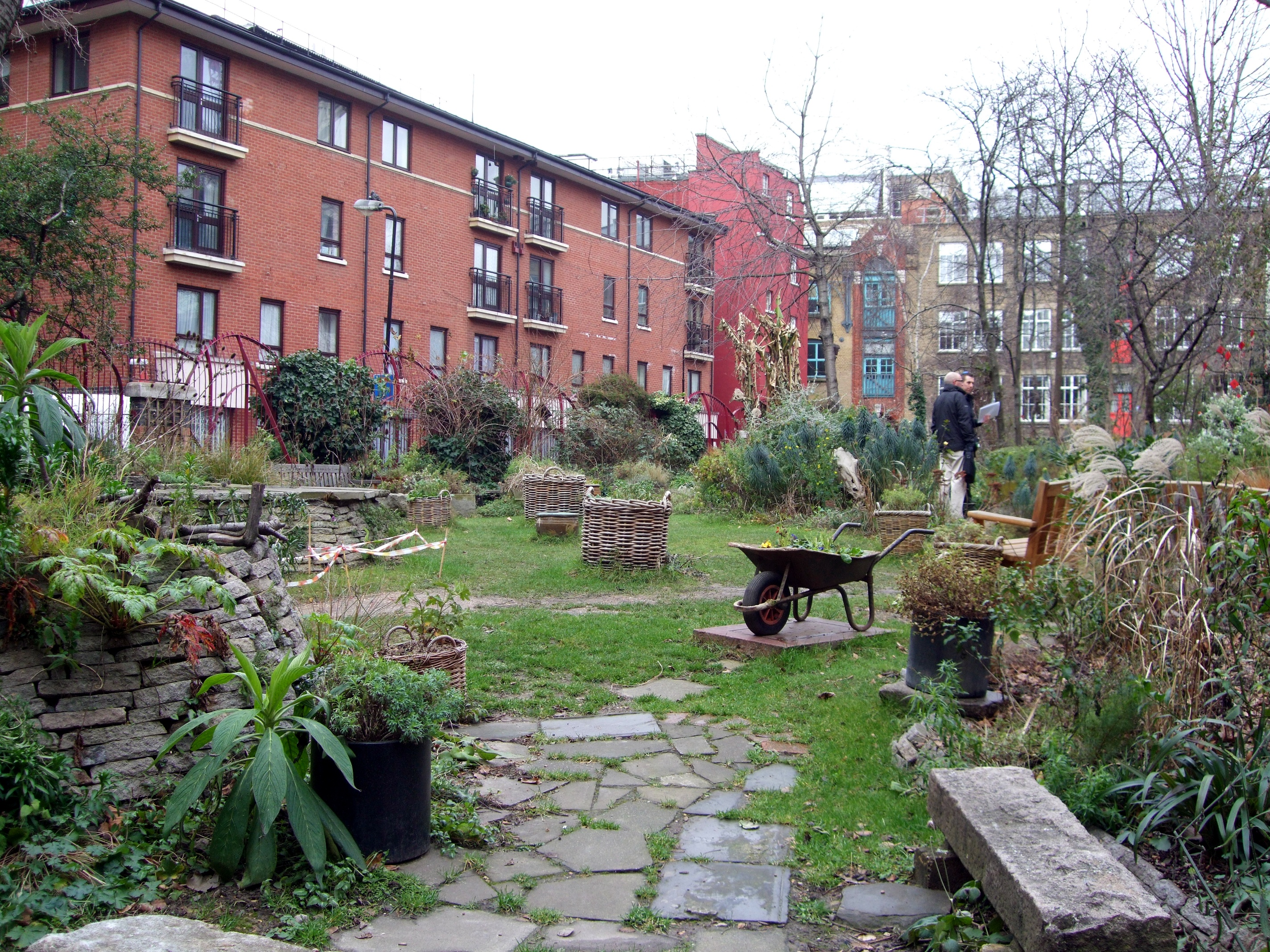
Phoenix Garden in 2009

The Phoenix Garden is a local community garden in central London, England, established in 1984. Located in St Giles behind the Phoenix Theatre, within the London Borough of Camden, the Phoenix Garden is nestled between the busy Soho and Covent Garden areas. The Garden is located just off St Giles Passage and Stacey Street, north of Shaftesbury Avenue and east of Charing Cross Road.

The Garden was set up on a carpark in the 1980s, which had itself been established on a World War II bombsite (the site was bombed in 1940). Prior to this the Garden was the site of many houses, including a pub. The Phoenix Garden has survived various challenges, including a major industrial fly-tipping incident soon after its foundation. It is the only one of the original seven Covent Garden Community Gardens to survive to this day.

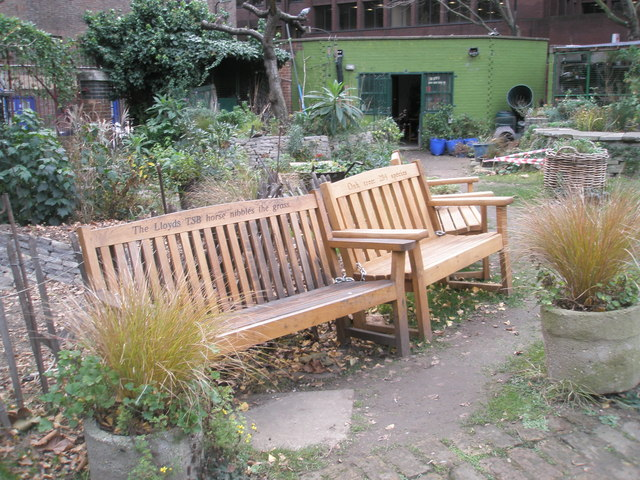
Phoenix Garden benches

The Phoenix Garden continues to be run by a committee of volunteers comprising local residents and workers. It is a registered charity (number 287502), and used to be known as the Covent Garden Open Spaces Association (CGOSA). The Garden has won first prize for Best Environmental Garden in the Camden in Bloom competition six times, from 2004 to 2010. It also holds regular social events, including an annual Agricultural Show and volunteering work-days.

The garden was under threat of closure in 2016, and was closed for an 18-month renovation. It reopened in 2017 with an event space building designed by Office Sian. The garden is featured in the 2019 film Last Christmas.
