= Steven Gontarski =

American sculptor

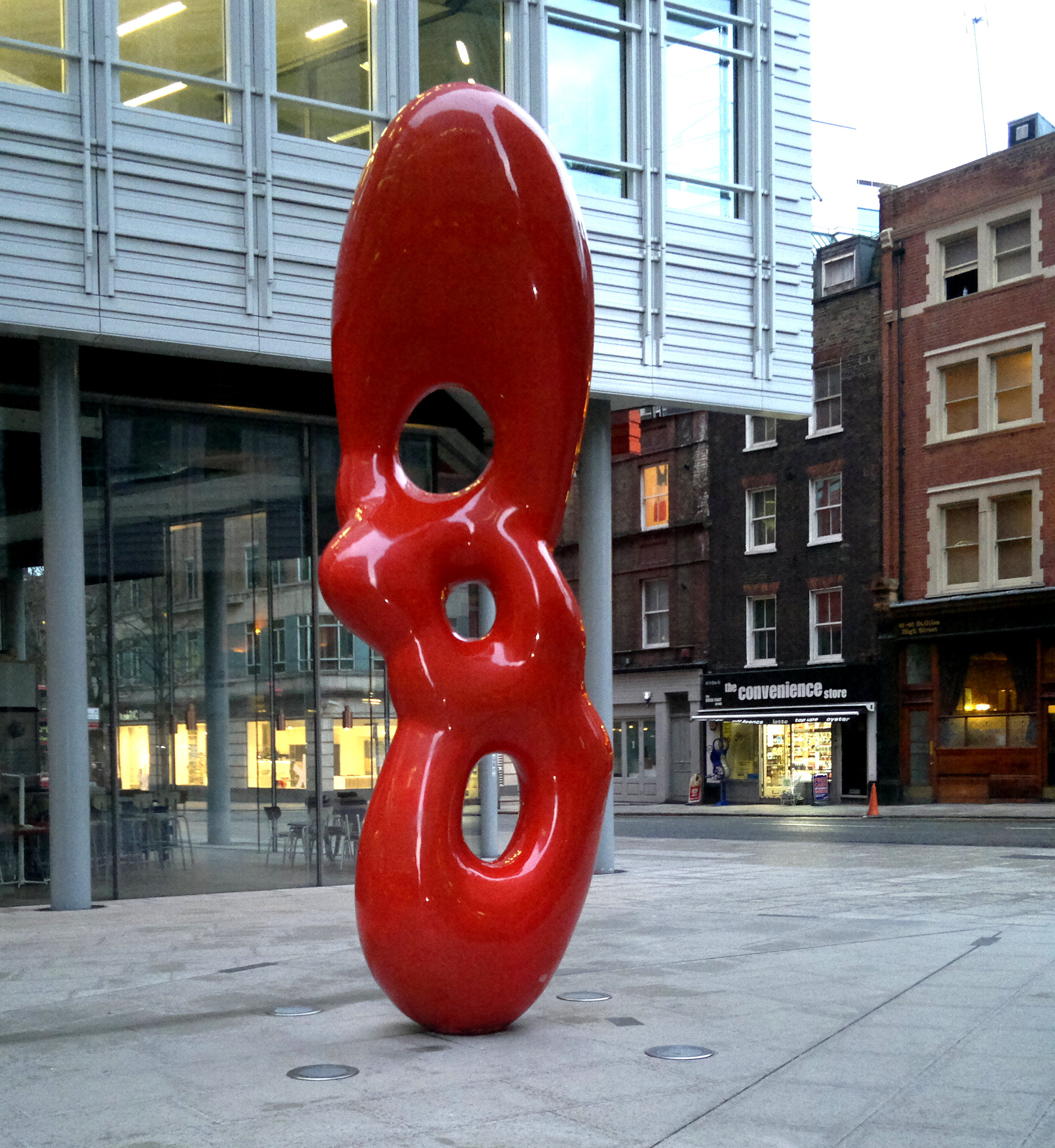
Ob 8 by Steven Gontarski, Central Saint Giles Piazza, London, 2008.

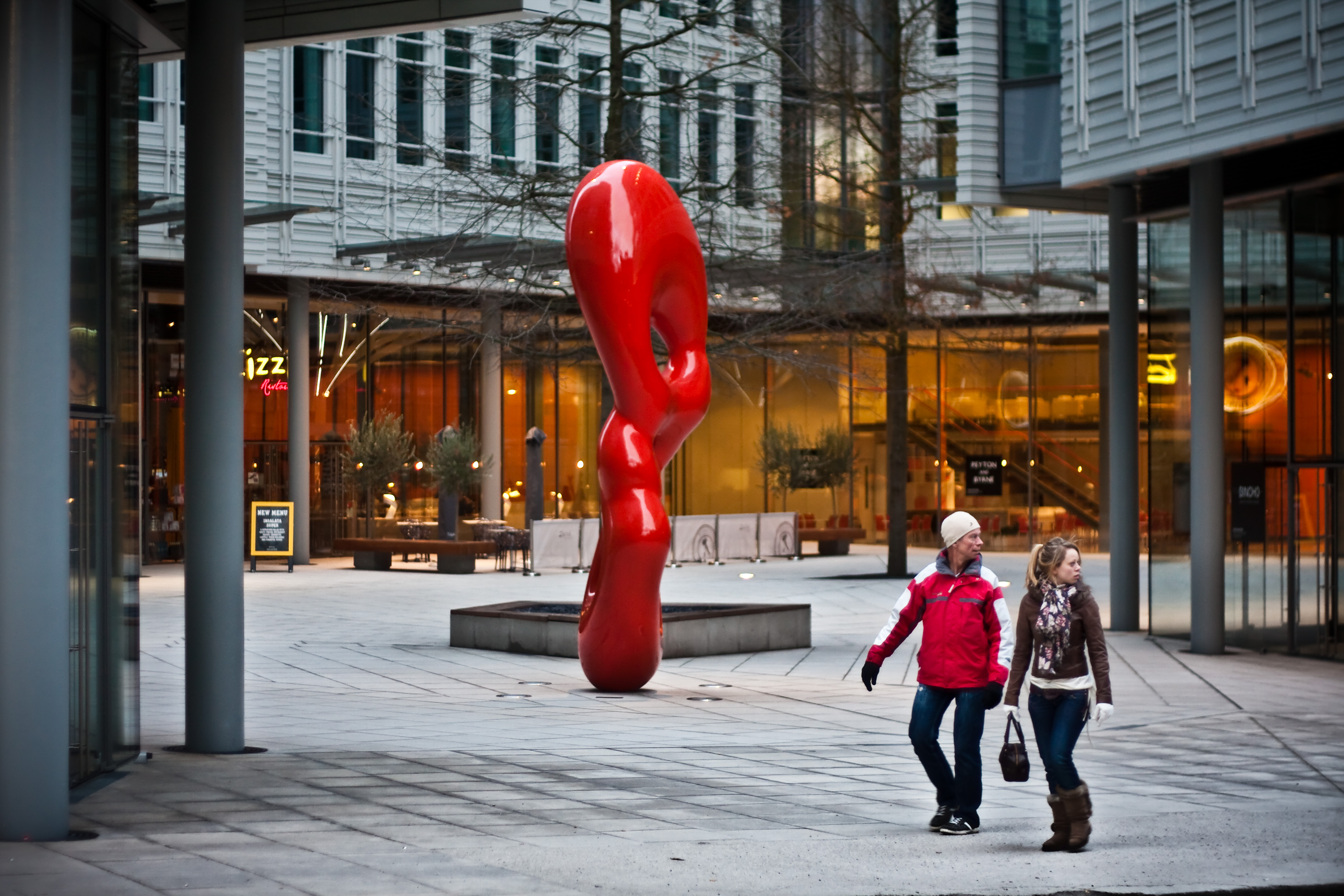
Alternate view of Ob 8.

Steven Gontarski (born 1972) is a sculptor from Philadelphia whose work has been included in solo and group exhibitions at the Institute of Contemporary Arts, Kunsthalle Wien, White Cube gallery and the Groninger Museum. Gontarski is a graduate of Brown University and Goldsmiths College, University of London.

In 2008, Gontarski created Ob 8, a bright red abstract sculpture which stands 5 metres high and is made of painted and lacquered glass-fibre-reinforced plastic. The organic shape of the work has been described as "recognisable but not identifiable, conjuring comparisons to many things in the real world: clouds, organs, oceans, smoke rings."

== Solo exhibitions ==
2010 I woke up to the sound of a drum, Gimpel Fils, London Ob 08, Central Saint Giles, London

2008 Steven Gontarski, Paddington Central, Phase II, London

2007 Sculptures, Gimpel Fils, London Portraits, Changing Role, Rome Obélisques CC/BS, Nouveaux commanditaires, Chaucenne, France

2006 Steven Gontarski, pkm gallery, Seoul Steven Gontarski, Changing Role, Naples Day of St George, White Cubicle - George and Dragon, London Steven Gontarski - Centre d’Art Mobile, L’Eglise de Fouvent et Roche en Haute-Saône

2005 The Visitors, Groninger Museum, Groningen

2004 December Morning Prophecy, White Cube, London Zero, The Economist Plaza, London Steven Gontarski, Gandy Gallery, Prague

2003 Prophet, Karyn Lovegrove Gallery, Los Angeles Steven Gontarski, Le Consortium, Dijon

2002 Epsilon Delta, Art at Habitat, Habitat Kensington, London

2001 Sun Valley, One in the Other, London

2000 Steven Gontarski, White Cube, London Steven Gontarski. The Unbalance of Boredom, Taché-Lévy Gallery, Brussels L.A.X., Islington Business and Design Centre, London

1999 Nurse, Johnen & Schöttle Gallery, Cologne
