= Frischmann =

Frischmann is a surname of German origin, being a variant of the surnames Frisch and Frischman. Notable people with the surname include:

- David Frischmann (1859–1922), Hebrew and Yiddish modernist writer, poet, and translator
- Jörg Frischmann (born 1963), German Paralympic athlete
- Justine Frischmann (born 1969), English artist and retired musician
- Wilem Frischmann (born 1931), British engineer

== See also ==
- Pell Frischmann, a multi-disciplinary engineering consultancy based in London
- Frisch
