= Frisch =

Frisch is a surname. Notable people with the surname include:

- Aileen Frisch, South Korean luger
- Arno Frisch, Austrian actor
- Cyrus Frisch, Dutch film director
- David Frisch (American football), American football player
- David H. Frisch (1918–1991), American physicist
- Deborah Frisch, American psychologist
- Frankie Frisch (1898–1973), American baseball player
- Hartvig Marcus Frisch (1754–1816), Danish businessman
- Irene Frisch (1931–2021), Holocaust survivor and author
- Johan Dalgas Frisch (born 1930), Brazilian engineer and ornithologist
- Johann Leonhard Frisch (1666–1743), German linguist, entomologist and ornithologist
- Karl von Frisch (1886–1982), Austrian ethologist
- Martin Frisch (1899–1959), Hungarian/American mechanical engineer
- Max Frisch, Swiss playwright, and novelist
- Michael Frisch (born 1957), German politician
- Morten Frisch, Danish epidemiologist
- Otto Robert Frisch (1904–1979), Austrian-British physicist
- Ragnar Anton Kittil Frisch (1895–1979), Norwegian economist
- Uriel Frisch (born 1940), French mathematical physicist

== See also ==
- Frisch family, a Norwegian family whose most famous member is Ragnar Frisch
- Frisch School, a Modern Orthodox Jewish day school in Paramus, New Jersey that was named after someone with the last name Frisch.
- Frisk (disambiguation)
- Fritsch, a surname
