= Frisk =

Frisk may refer to:

- Frisk (confectionery), a product line of breath mint candies
- Frisk (novel), a 1991 novel by Dennis Cooper
  - Frisk (film), a 1995 film based on the novel
- Frisk (surname)
- Frisk Asker Ishockey, a Norwegian ice hockey team also known as the "Frisk Tigers"
- Frisk Luft, a Norwegian gospel group
- The Frisk, a punk rock band
- FRISK Software International, an Icelandic software company acquired by Commtouch
- Frisk, the main protagonist in the video game Undertale
- Frisking, a search of a person
- Mr Frisk, a racehorse

== See also ==
- Frisch
