= LGBTQ life expectancy =

Lifespan of gay, lesbian, bisexual and transgender populations

The life expectancy of lesbian, gay, bisexual, transgender, and queer (LGBTQ) people is a subject of research. Early research by the Cameron group purporting to find a significantly shorter life expectancy among homosexuals is not considered reliable, although it has been widely misused and cited. During the AIDS crisis, a loss in average life expectancy was observed among gay men.

In the late 2000s, research suggested "the claims of drastically increased overall mortality in gay men and lesbians appear unjustified". A 2022 study in Sweden found no gap in mortality between homosexual and heterosexual individuals, although mortality may be higher in bisexuals. A 2022 study in the United States found no excess mortality among gay and bisexual males, but found excess mortality among bisexual and lesbian females. A 2026 study in the United Kingdom estimated that sexual minority men had a life expectancy 1.2 years less than heterosexuals, and among 0.9 years lower among sexual minority women.

As of 2021, there is not yet reliable research on life expectancy of transgender people, although false statistics have been widely circulated.

== Gay and bisexual life expectancy ==
=== Flawed claims of significantly shorter life expectancy ===
==== Cameron studies ====
Early studies by Paul Cameron purported to find that homosexuals had a life expectancy 20 to 30 years shorter than heterosexuals, however due to its methodology it has been criticized as unreliable. Cameron's work was described as "just ridiculous" by demographer Nicholas Eberstadt at the conservative American Enterprise Institute; and the epidemiologist Morten Frisch described his work ''of such a grave nature that no decent peer-reviewed scientific journal should let it pass for publication". Cameron had relied on newspaper obituaries which clearly referred to sexual orientation, with bias in sampling and errors in statistical technique. In the 1980s, Cameron was expelled from the American Psychological Association for violations.

==== Hogg study ====
Another study published in 1998 by Hogg et al. modelled the impact of AIDS deaths in Vancouver between 1987 and 1992, using a sample of men who attended a sexual health clinic, and estimated a loss of average life expectancy in the gay and bisexual men as from 8 to 21 years. The authors released a statement in 2001 clarifying that their findings were relevant to the AIDS crisis, but were no longer relevant at the time of publication as AIDS deaths had fallen significantly, primarily due to antiretroviral therapy.

==== Misuse ====
Despite the flaws of Paul Cameron's research, and the limited applicability of the Hogg study, many anti-gay groups and individuals have cited these studies to characterize homosexuality as inherently unhealthy. Paul Cameron's research group has claimed that homosexuality is "as dangerous to public health as drug abuse, prostitution, and smoking". In 1997, the former U.S. secretary of education William Bennett claimed that gay men die at 43 years during a television interview, a figure from a flawed Cameron study.

In response to frequent misuse, Hogg et al. clarified their findings were no longer applicable in 2001. In 2003, the economist Walter E. Williams cited the Hogg study to argue that homosexuals should pay more for life insurance, stating "that's a lifestyle shortening of life expectancy greater than obesity and tobacco use". In 2012, the Australian Anglican Archbishop Peter Jensen made similar claims on national television.

=== Frisch 2009 and 2013 studies ===
The Danish epidemiologist Morten Frisch carried out more robust research in 2009 using marriage data from Denmark. His study found excess mortality was limited to the first few years of marriage, consistent with some men who had preexisting illnesses (e.g. HIV/AIDS) marrying and dying. Frisch stated "we observed a drastic reduction from 9.63 excess deaths per 1000 person-years among those who married their partner in the pre-HAART period to 1.53 excess deaths per 1000 person-years for those who married during the HAART period". According to Frisch, "the claims of drastically increased overall mortality in gay men and lesbians appear unjustified".

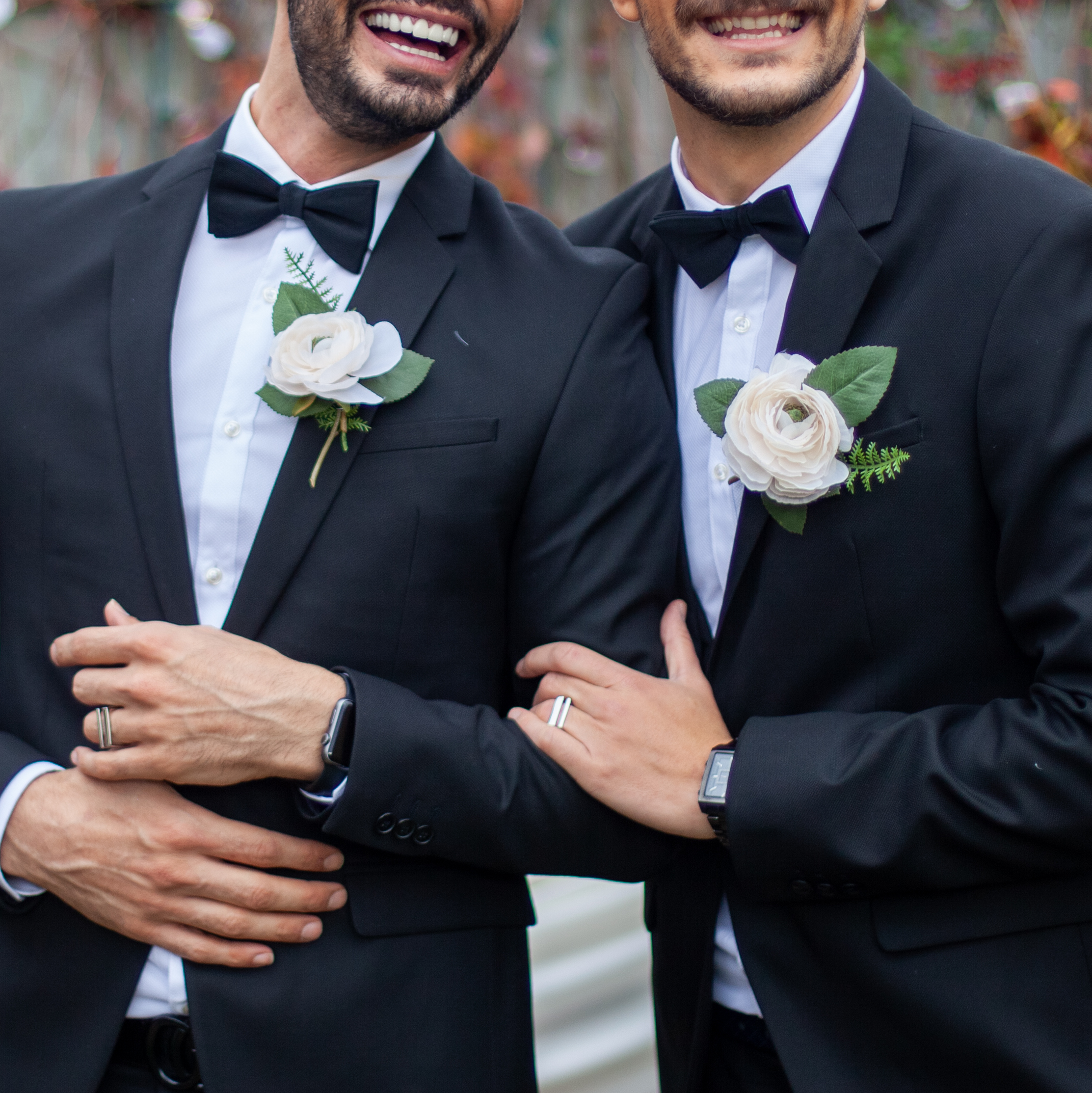
Same-sex marriage has been linked with increases in life expectancy compared to unmarried same-sex couples.

In 2013, Frisch published another study which found excess mortality in homosexual men had shrunk further. It linked same-sex marriage with increases in life expectancy.

=== 2014 retraction ===
A 2014 study by Hatzenbuelher et al. purported to find that sexual minorities living in areas with high levels of anti-gay prejudice had their life expectancy reduced by 12 years. However, it was retracted in 2019 when it was discovered there was a coding error in the data, and that after correcting the error it "rendered the association between structural stigma and mortality risk no longer statistically significant".

=== 2020 Swedish mortality study ===
A 2020 study by Lindström et al. found that mortality among Swedish homosexual men and women did not significantly differ from heterosexuals, although it was elevated for bisexual men and women.

=== 2022 United States mortality study ===
A 2022 study in the United States found no excess mortality among gay or bisexual males, but there was excess mortality among sexual minority females.

=== 2026 United Kingdom ONS study ===
In February 2026, the Office for National Statistics (ONS) published the first UK estimates of period life expectancy by sexual orientation, using linked 2021 Census responses (self-identified orientation for ages 16+) and death registrations from March 2021 to March 2024 in England and Wales. These experimental statistics report remaining life expectancy starting at age 20:

- Men identifying as LGB+ (gay, bisexual, other) had an estimated life expectancy 1.2 years lower than heterosexual men.
- Women identifying as LGB (lesbian, bisexual, other) had an estimated life expectancy 0.9 years lower than heterosexual women.

== Transgender life expectancy ==
According to Bosson et al. "the systematic research needed to determine the average life expectancy of transgender people has not yet been conducted".

One unsubstantiated statistic widely circulated in the media claims that the life expectancy of transgender women of color (sometimes transgender women in general) is only 35 years old; however, this is not corroborated by any research. According to sociologist Laurel Westbrook, this inaccurate statistic was calculated by averaging the age of transgender murder victims. This is a misleading methodology for calculating life expectancy, as murder victims are not a representative sample of transgender people.

Several studies have been conducted that indicate that transgender individuals have an increased mortality rate, but these studies have not modelled life expectancy.

== See also ==
- Life expectancy
- Anti-LGBTQ rhetoric
- Epidemiology
