= Friske =

Friske is a surname. Notable people with the surname include:

- Donald Fiske (born 1961), American politician and businessman
- Jeanna Friske (1974–2015), Russian actress, singer and model
- Neil Friske (born 1961), American politician
- Richard Friske (1923–2002), American politician
- Elisabeth Friske (1939 or 1940–1987), West German airline pilot

== See also ==
- Frisk (surname)
