= Frisk (surname) =

Frisk is a Swedish surname. It is one of many Swedish army names originally given to soldiers to make their names more distinctive. Notable people with the surname include:

- Anders Frisk (born 1963), Swedish football referee
- Andreas Frisk (born 1984), Swedish ice hockey player
- Emil Frisk (1874–1922), American baseball player
- Helena Frisk (born 1965), Swedish politician of the Social Democratic Party
- Hjalmar Frisk (1900–1984), Swedish linguist and philologist
- Johanna Frisk (born 1986), Swedish football player
- Niclas Frisk (born 1969), Swedish musician
- Patrik Frisk, American businessman, CEO of Under Armour
- Viktor Frisk (born 1995), Swedish fashion blogger and singer

== See also ==
- Friske
