= Wilem Frischmann =

British engineer (1931–2026)

- Born: 27 January 1931; Ungvar, Czechoslovakia
- Died: 20 August 2026 (aged 95)
- Engineering career
- Discipline: Structural engineer
- Institutions: Institution of Structural Engineers; Institution of Civil Engineers
- Practice name: Pell Frischmann
- Projects: Centre Point; Tower 42; Drapers Gardens

Wilem William Frischmann (27 January 1931 – 20 August 2026) was a British engineer, who was chairman of the internationally recognised firm of consulting engineers Pell Frischmann. He was generally considered to be one of the foremost engineers of his generation due to his reputation gained on technically ground-breaking developments including Centre Point, Tower 42 (formerly National Westminster Tower) and Drapers Gardens.

== Early life and education ==
Wilem Frischmann was born on 27 January 1931 in Ungvar (now Uzhhorod, Ukraine) which was then in Czechoslovakia. He survived the Holocaust and came to England as a refugee at the age of 15. He attended the Hammersmith College of Art & Building and the Imperial College – University of London. He obtained his PhD degree from City, University of London.

== Career ==
Frischmann joined C. J. Pell & Partners in 1958, becoming a partner in 1961, and the chairman in 1968. In October 2015, it was announced that Frischmann would be stepping down from his role as chairman to take on an advisory role to the incoming chairman Jürgen Wild.

=== Notable projects ===
==== Centre Point, London ====
Centre Point is one of the best known landmarks in London. He championed an innovative use of high-quality pre-cast concrete in its design. The external columns have specifically designed joints to provide continuity in the structure to prevent progressive collapse and it was constructed without any external scaffolding. As well as being the tallest building built with prefabricated elements, Centre Point was the first building using large diameter piles in London Clay. He carried out extensive testing of the distribution of loads by friction and bearing to estimate the settlement of the building. The resulting paper earned the IStructE Research Diploma. In 2009 it won First Prize in the Mature Structures category at the Concrete Society Awards.

==== Tower 42 (formerly Nat West Tower), London ====
Frischmann was responsible for the design of this 52-storey landmark structure in London, the tallest building in London at the time of its construction. The firm carried out natural frequency tests and modelled the potential for progressive collapse. After the IRA bomb attack, PF carried out the same tests and found that the structure had not been significantly damaged. The project won the European Award for Steels Structures from CECM Prix European De La Construction Metallique and the paper detailing the towers design won an ICE award.

==== Drapers Gardens, London ====
During the construction of this twenty-eight storey building, PF tested and proved that the solid steel mullions provided adequate fire resistance without any need for fire protection. A paper on the development won the Oscar Faber Bronze Medal awarded by the IStructE.

==== Aldersgate Street, London ====
Frischmann helped bring the world of innovation which surrounds engineering to the public. PF were appointed to design the Aldersgate Street development in the centre of London, which has the deepest in London (14-storeys); and used a construction technique WWF had previously published a paper on. The techniques were covered in an article in The Sunday Times.

=== Contribution to the engineering profession ===
==== Ronan Point collapse ====
Before the Ronan Point collapse in 1968, Frischmann had already expressed his concern in the structural characteristics of non-continuous prefabricated buildings. After the event, he was appointed by the Treasury to write a report. He also appeared on David Frost's television show, to demonstrate why Ronan Point had collapsed.

==== Collaborative working ====
Before "collaborative working" became an industry buzzword, Frischmann was championing the benefits of cohesive teams and early contractor involvement, in his paper "Features in the design and construction of Drapers Gardens Development" he said:

"What is, in our opinion, worth noting is the fact that this building is the result of close cooperation of all parties under the leadership of the architect."

A number of well-recognised names in engineering and construction backed his opinion in a later discussion paper.

==== The cross-channel bridge ====
Frischmann was a widely publicised ambassador of engineering, whose work appeared not just in the trade press but also the national press. He was vociferous in advocating the link across the channel and promoted a bridge solution rather than a tunnel, with the creation of a deep sea port for container vessels by extending the existing islands of Varne and Le Colbert. He appeared in the Observer Magazine and on the cover of the Sunday Telegraph Magazine in support of the link; as well as mentions in Construction News and The Times.

==== The future of tall buildings ====
Frischmann is best known for his Tall Buildings, and wrote an important paper on the future of high-rise developments for vertical cities. The paper caught the public's imagination and it was featured on Tomorrow's World and covered twice in The Times.

== Personal life and death ==
Frischmann was the father of Richard Frischmann and artist and musician Justine Frischmann.

Frischmann died on 20 August 2026, aged 95.
