= Frisch family =

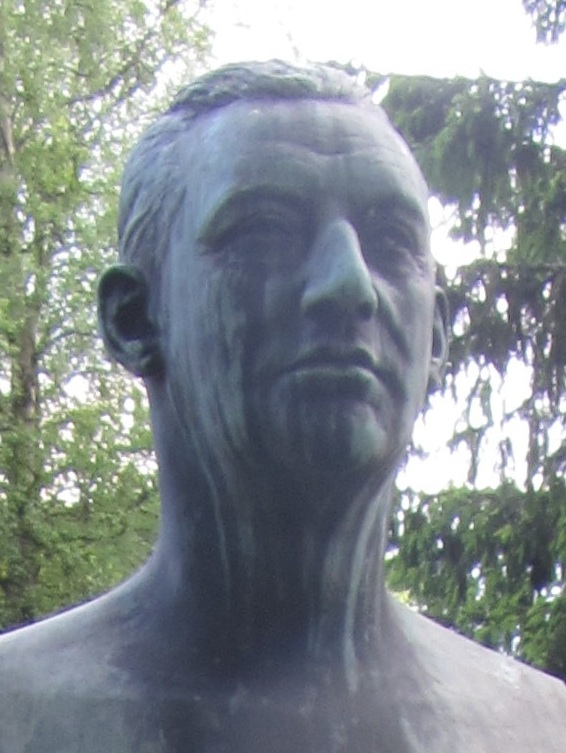
Anton Frisch (1865–1928), goldsmith in Oslo, and father of the economist Ragnar Frisch

Frisch is a Norwegian family of German origin, of which many members were associated with the Kongsberg Silver Mines for several centuries since the 17th century. In the 19th and early 20th centuries, family members were noted as goldsmiths in Oslo. Its most famous member is Ragnar Frisch, the first Nobel laureate in economics.

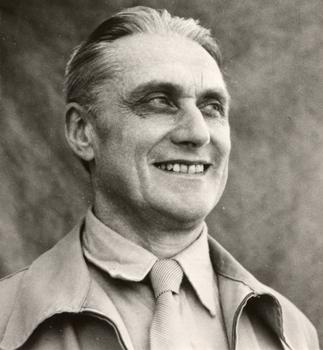
Ragnar Frisch, Nobel laureate in economics

It is descended from Christopher Frisch (born 1615), who came from Germany to work for the Kongsberg Silver Mines in Norway. He was the father of Petter Christophersen Frisch (1640–1703) (also spelled Pieter Frisk). His sons were Paul Pettersen Frisch (1665–1730) and Christopher Pettersen Frisch (1672–1726). Paul Pettersen Frisch was married to Anne Antoniusdatter Nolt (born before 1678), daughter of Antonius Nolt (a German immigrant who also worked at the Kongsberg Silver Mines) and Barbro Hansdatter Schröder (1641–1712), a daughter of Hans Andersen Schröder (born ca. 1610–1615 in Sweden, died 1675). Paul Frisch and Anne Nolt were the parents of Ole Povelsen Frisch (1700–1779). Ole Povelsen Frisch was the great-grandfather of goldsmith in Christiania Antonius Povelsen Frisch (1826–1916), who was the father of goldsmith Anton Frisch (1865–1928) and grandfather of the economist and Nobel laureate Ragnar Frisch. The Frisch Centre in Oslo and the Frisch Medal in economics are both named for Ragnar Frisch. Ragnar Frisch was the maternal grandfather of the television presenter Nadia Hasnaoui.
