= Pell Frischmann =

Engineering consultancy

- Type: Private Limited
- Industry: Engineering Consulting
- Founded: 1926
- Founder: Cecil Pell
- Headquarters: London, United Kingdom
- Number of locations: Offices in six countries
- Key people: Jürgen Wild (Chairman); Tushar Prabhu (Chief Executive); Richard Barrett (Chief Executive); Sudhakar S. Prabhu (Former Deputy chairman); Keith Clarke (Former Deputy chairman)
- Products: Engineering consultancy services
- Services: Consultancy services
- Revenue: £ 23.7 million (2012)
- Number of employees: 1,000+
- Website: pellfrischmann.com

Pell Frischmann (PF) is a multi-disciplinary engineering consultancy based in London that provides structural and civil engineering, planning, design, and consulting services. Pell Frischmann employs over 1,000 staff worldwide with eight offices across the UK and international offices in India, the Middle East, Turkey and Romania.

The original company was founded by Cecil Pell in the 1920s, who entered into partnership with Wilem Frischmann in the early 1970s forming Pell Frischmann and Partners. In 2003, the umbrella company became Pell Frischmann Consulting Engineers. Major subsidiaries of the company include Frischmann Prabhu operating in the Asia-Pacific region and Conseco operating in the Middle East.

Key areas of business include buildings, building services, land development and regeneration, traffic and transportation, highways and bridges, railways, environment and process technology, water and wastewater, power, fire engineering and IT and telecommunications. In April 2015, Pell Frischmann received The Queen's Award for International Trade.

== History ==
The original company was founded in 1926 by Cecil Pell, who subsequently formed Pell Frischmann and Partners with Wilem Frischmann in 1972. The Group became a limited company in 1984. Until the late 1960s, the Group's activities centred on structural engineering and mechanical and electrical building services.

Pell Frischmann Group has acquired a number of companies, including the Department for Transport's West Yorkshire Road Construction Sub-Unit (1981), 70 staff from the Infrastructure Directorate of the Milton Keynes Development Corporation joined the Group to form Pell Frischmann Milton Keynes Ltd (1988), Pell Frischmann Water Ltd was formed in 1990 as a joint venture between the Pell Frischmann Group and South West Water plc. EPD Consultants was acquired from Balfour Beatty (1998) and De Leuw Rothwell Ltd (2000) was a new company set up safeguarding the jobs of a number of staff following the collapse and subsequent liquidation of the former De Leuw Rothwell.

In 2002, the various offices were consolidated under one umbrella company and in September 2003 the company was restructured and changed its trading company name to Pell Frischmann Consulting Engineers (PFCE).

Major subsidiaries include Frischmann Prabhu founded by Sudhakar Prabhu and based in Mumbai providing expertise in the Asia-Pacific region and Conseco International which focuses on projects in the Middle East and was awarded the Queen's Award for Enterprise in 2006 for work in the reconstruction of Iraq.

In October 2015, it was announced that RAG-Stiftung (Foundation) Investment Company had bought a majority stake in the company.

== Notable projects ==
=== Centre Point, London ===
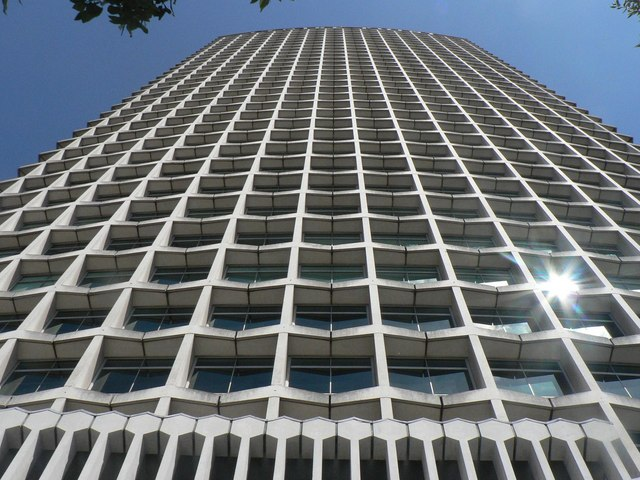
Centre Point's façade

The 385-foot (117 m) tall Centre Point tower was constructed between 1963 and 1966. It is a 32-storey office building above Tottenham Court Road tube station with 292,563 sq ft (27,180.0 m^{2}) of floor space. Pell Frischmann provided structural engineering design and construction supervision services. The external columns, load-bearing façade and floors are prefabricated off-site from concrete which was highly polished to give it the appearance of marble or granite. Centre Point achieved a record building time in the 1960s, where a complete floor cycle was achieved in seven days without the use of exterior scaffolding.

=== United Kingdom ===
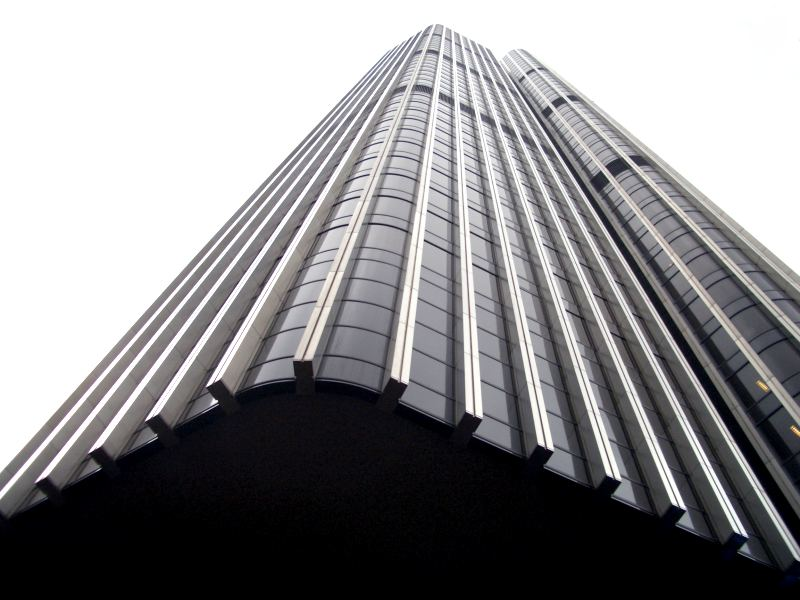
Tower 42 viewed from directly below

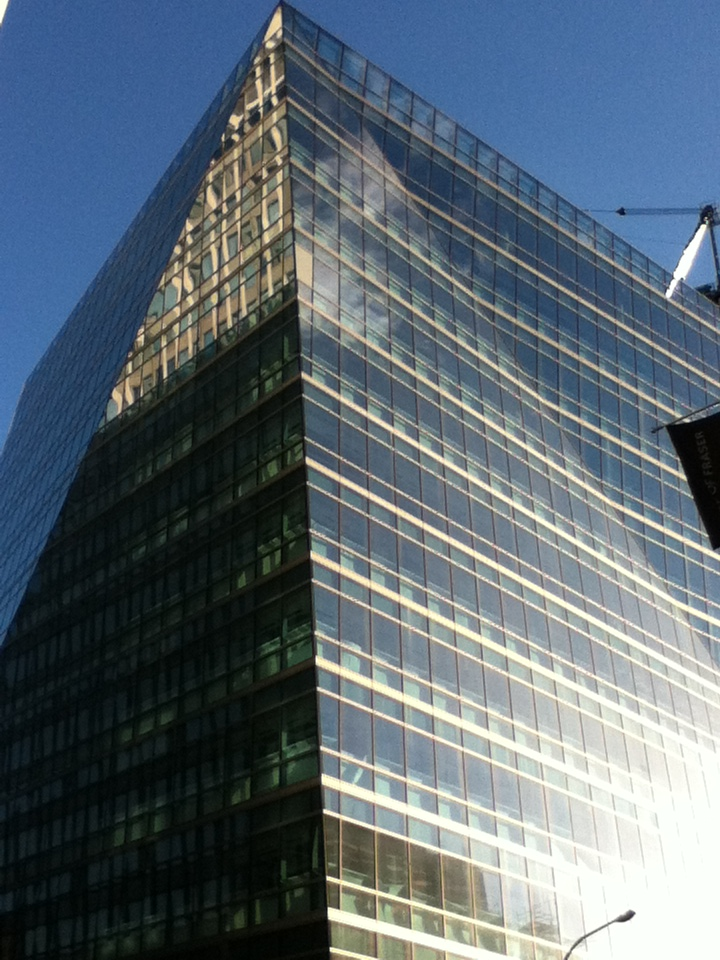
62 Buckingham Gate

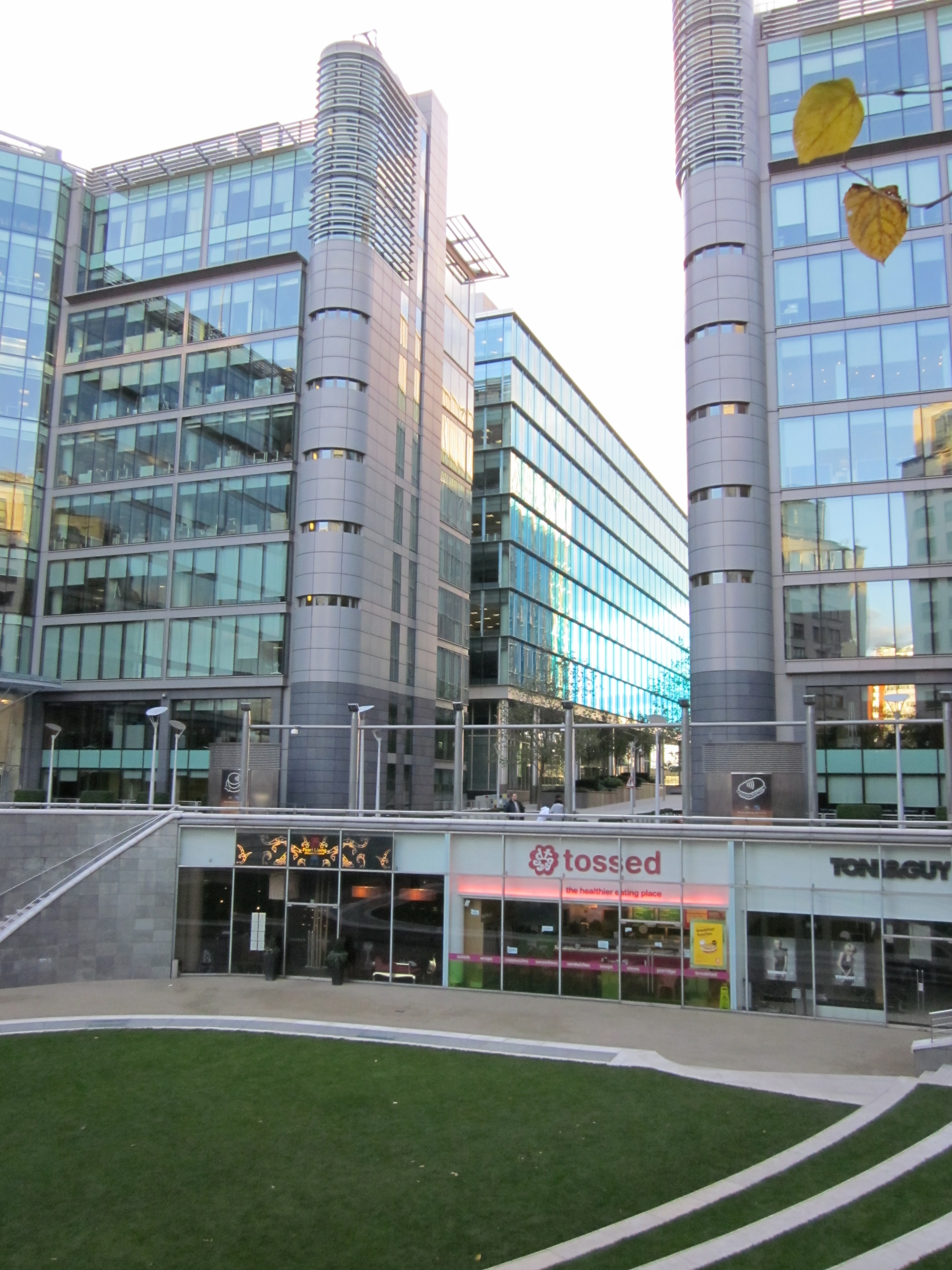
Sheldon Square, Paddington Central

- Tower 42 (formerly National Westminster Tower), London; The 52-storey tall former NatWest Tower office building has a gross floor area of approximately 750,000 sq ft (70,000 m^{2}) and rises to 200 m (660 ft) above ground level.
- Liverpool One, Liverpool
- 62 Buckingham Gate; the building was designed by Pelli Clarke Pelli and Swanke Hayden & Connell with Pell Frischmann working as structural engineers. It was completed in May 2013 with 256,970 sq ft (23,873 m^{2}) of office space. Pell Frischmann was shortlisted in the 2013 ACE awards 'Building Structures Large' category for its work on the groundscraper.
- Home Office Headquarters (2 Marsham Street), London
- New Street Square, London
- 7–10 Old Bailey, London
- University of Oxford, Oxford; Pell Frischmann has worked on a number of projects in the university including the following:

- New Bodleian Library; provided structural engineering services for the new structure.
- Earth Sciences Building; a teaching and research facility for the Earth Sciences Department designed by Wilkinson Eyre and partnered with Hoare Lea. Pell Frischmann won the ACE Engineering Excellence award for Building Structures in 2011 for its work on the department.
- Blavatnik School of Government; Pell Frischmann provided civil and structural engineering services for the new build structure. The building includes a 200 person capacity lecture theatre, teaching spaces, and seminar rooms.
- St Cross College; extensions to workspaces and accommodation. Pell Frischmann provided structural engineering services while Hoare Lea provided mechanical and electrical engineering.

- Hunts House, King's College London
- Cornwall House, King's College London
- Paddington Central, London; Paddington Central Development (Phase 1) is some 12 storeys high and comprises more than 400,000 sq ft (37,000 m^{2}) of prime office accommodation, together with retail and leisure space of a further 75,000 sq ft (7,000 m^{2}) and over 200 residential units.
- The Point, Paddington, London

=== Middle East ===
- Al Zeina Beach Development, Abu Dhabi; provides 1,200 beach-front apartments.
