= Andreas Frisk =

Swedish ice hockey player

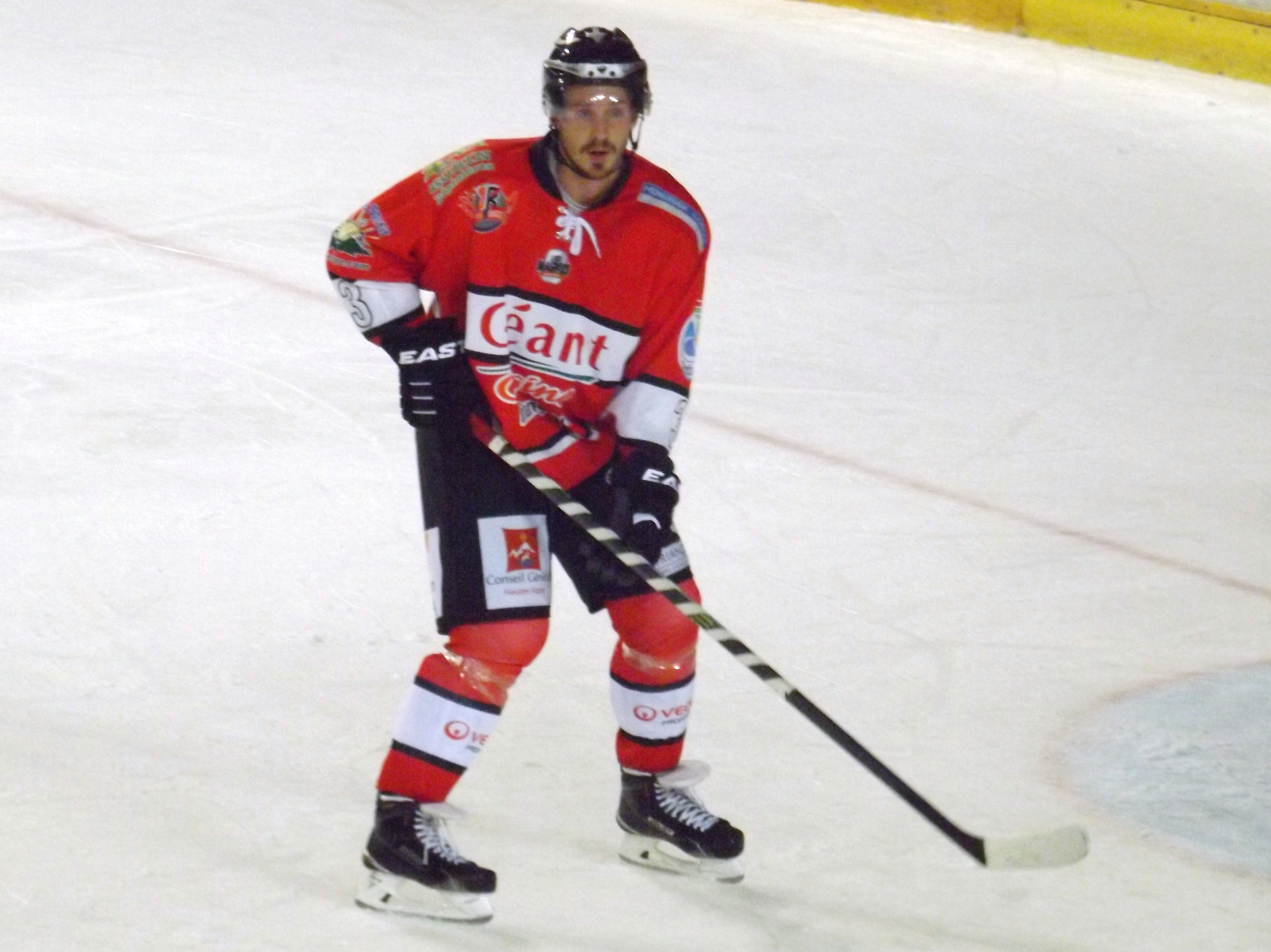
- Born: January 5, 1984; Solna, Sweden
- Height: 6 ft 0 in (183 cm)
- Weight: 176 lb (80 kg; 12 st 8 lb)
- Position: Defence
- Shoots: Left
- GET team Former teams: Vålerenga; IK Comet; Örebro HK; AIK; VIK Västerås; Diables Rouges de Briançon
- Playing career: 1999–present

Andreas Frisk (born January 5, 1984) is a Swedish professional ice hockey defenceman, currently playing for Vålerenga of the Norwegian GET-ligaen.

Andreas played for AIK until he left for Vålerenga in 2008. He spent almost two years in Norway, playing part of his second season for IK Comet. He then returned to Sweden to play for Örebro HK, which he stayed with for three seasons, before returning to AIK in 2012.

== Career statistics ==
=== Regular season and playoffs ===
			Regular season					Playoffs
Season	Team	League	GP	G	A	Pts	PIM	GP	G	A	Pts	PIM
1999–00	AIK	U16	8	2	4	6	8	-	-	-	-	-
1999-00	AIK	J18	10	0	3	3	2	1	0	0	0	0
2000-01	AIK	J18	12	3	5	8	18	-	-	-	-	-
2000-01	AIK	J20	1	1	0	1	0	5	0	0	0	0
2001-02	AIK	J18	8	1	12	13	6	4	0	2	2	12
2001-02	AIK	J20	30	0	1	1	24	4	0	0	0	2
2002-03	AIK	J20	30	4	12	16	32	4	1	0	1	4
2003-04	AIK	J20	23	1	9	10	20	3	0	0	0	0
2003-04	AIK	Swe-2	33	1	3	4	30	1	0	0	0	2
2004-05	AIK	J20	1	0	1	1	2	-	-	-	-	-
2004-05	AIK	Swe-3	28	5	8	13	30	10	1	2	3	6
2005-06	AIK	J20	3	1	4	5	4	-	-	-	-	-
2005-06	AIK	Swe-2	42	4	15	19	63	-	-	-	-	-
2006-07	AIK	Swe-2	45	5	11	16	71	-	-	-	-	-
2007-08	AIK	Swe-2	45	2	10	12	68
2008-09	Vålerenga	GET	42	5	6	11	28	17	1	2	3	10
2009-10	IK Comet	GET	5	1	3	4	2	-	-	-	-	-
2009-10	Örebro HK	Swe-2	46	2	14	16	24	-	-	-	-	-
2010-11	Örebro HK	Swe-2	50	5	17	22	64	10	0	2	2	6
2011-12	Örebro HK	Swe-2	51	3	17	20	38	10	0	1	1	10
2012-13	AIK	SHL	52	1	6	7	12	-	-	-	-	-
2013-14	VIK Västerås	Swe-2	43	2	8	10	16	10	1	0	1	0
2014-15	Diables Rouges de Briançon	Ligue Magnus	26	1	7	8	28	8	1	2	3	0
SHL totals			52	1	6	7	12	-	-	-	-	-
Swe-2 totals			355	24	95	119	350	31	1	3	4	18
GET totals			47	6	9	15	30	17	1	2	3	10
