= Morten Frisch =

- Education: University of Copenhagen
- Scientific career
- Fields: Epidemiology, sexual health
- Workplaces: Statens Serum Institut
- Thesis: On the etiology of anal squamous carcinoma (2002)

Morten Frisch is a Danish epidemiologist who works as a consultant and senior investigator at the Statens Serum Institut in Copenhagen.

== Education and career ==
Frisch received his M.D. in 1989, his Ph.D. in 1995, and his D.Sc. in 2002, all from the University of Copenhagen. In 2008, he was appointed an associate professor at the University of Copenhagen. In 2012, he was appointed an adjunct professor of sexual health epidemiology at Aalborg University.

== Research ==
Frisch's research focuses on the epidemiology of sexual health, cancers and autoimmune diseases. Research papers he has written or contributed to focus on topics of sexual dysfunction, mental health, circumcision, and transgender healthcare.

== Selected works ==
- Frisch, Morten, Robert J. Biggar, James J. Goedert, and AIDS–Cancer Match Registry Study Group. "Human papillomavirus-associated cancers in patients with human immunodeficiency virus infection and acquired immunodeficiency syndrome." Journal of the National Cancer Institute 92, no. 18 (2000): 1500-1510.
- Frisch, Morten, Robert J. Biggar, Eric A. Engels, James J. Goedert, and AIDS-Cancer Match Registry Study Group. "Association of cancer with AIDS-related immunosuppression in adults." Jama 285, no. 13 (2001): 1736-1745.
- Frisch, Morten, Bengt Glimelius, Adriaan JC van den Brule, Jan Wohlfahrt, Chris JLM Meijer, Jan MM Walboomers, Sven Goldman, Christer Svensson, Hans-Olov Adami, and Mads Melbye. "Sexually transmitted infection as a cause of anal cancer." New England Journal of Medicine 337, no. 19 (1997): 1350-1358.
- Engels, Eric A., Morten Frisch, James J. Goedert, Robert J. Biggar, and Robert W. Miller. "Merkel cell carcinoma and HIV infection." The Lancet 359, no. 9305 (2002): 497-498.
